= List of songs recorded by Kelly Clarkson =

Songs by American singer

Songs recorded by Kelly Clarkson
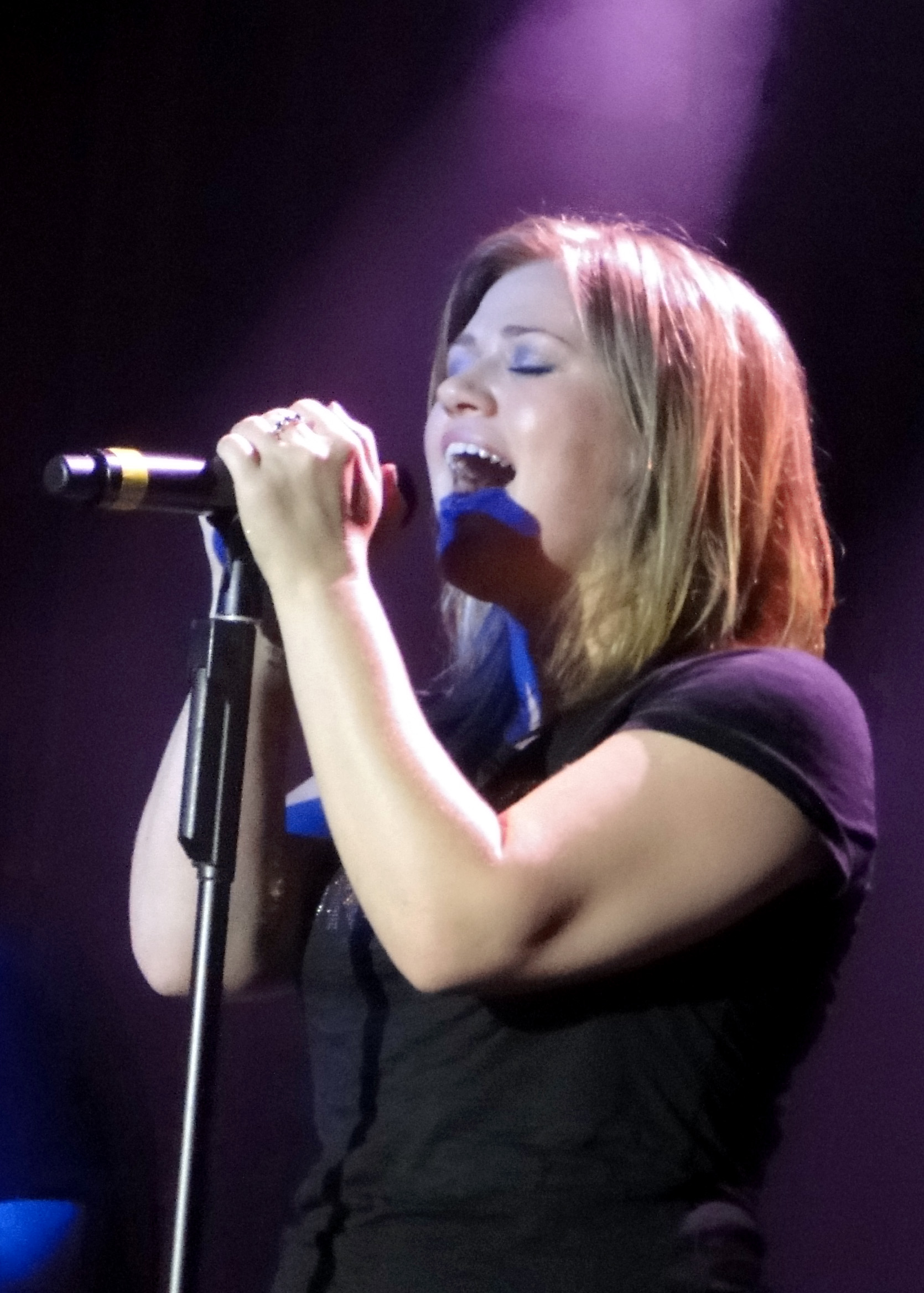
- Clarkson performing at the Highline Ballroom in New York City in 2010
- Released songs: 224

American singer Kelly Clarkson has recorded material for her ten studio albums. After signing a contract in 2002 with RCA Records, a division of then-Bertelsmann Music Group (now Sony Music), 20-year-old Clarkson released the double A-side single "Before Your Love" / "A Moment Like This" and began to record tracks for her debut studio album, Thankful (2003). Its lead single, "Miss Independent", received a nomination for a Grammy Award for Best Female Pop Vocal Performance in 2004. "Miss Independent" was followed by "Low" and "The Trouble With Love Is", which was featured as a single from the soundtrack of the film Love Actually. In 2004, Clarkson recorded the song "Breakaway", which was released as a single from the soundtrack of the film The Princess Diaries 2: Royal Engagement. The song's commercial success inspired Clarkson to name her second studio album Breakaway. The album won a Grammy Award for Best Pop Vocal Album in 2006, while its second single, "Since U Been Gone", won for Best Female Pop Vocal Performance. Subsequent singles, "Behind These Hazel Eyes" (2005), "Because of You" (2005), and "Walk Away" (2006), became successful hits. Clarkson's third studio album, My December, was released in 2007. The album became a subject of a dispute with then RCA Music Group chairman Clive Davis, who criticized the album and suggested that Clarkson reunite with her previous collaborators. "Never Again", the lead single from My December, became its only hit single. Succeeding releases from My December included "Sober", "One Minute", and "Don't Waste Your Time".

Clarkson released her fourth studio album, All I Ever Wanted, in 2009. The album received a nomination for a Grammy Award for Best Pop Vocal Album in 2010 and its first three singles, "My Life Would Suck Without You", "I Do Not Hook Up" and "Already Gone", became hits. The release of "Already Gone" was met with controversy due to its musical similarities with Beyoncé's "Halo" (2009); both were produced and co-written by OneRepublic lead singer Ryan Tedder. Subsequent releases from All I Ever Wanted included "All I Ever Wanted" (2010) and "Cry" (2010), which became less successful than its predecessors. In 2011, Clarkson released her fifth studio album, Stronger, which was preceded by its lead single "Mr. Know It All". In 2013, the album won a Grammy Award for Best Pop Vocal Album, while its second single, "Stronger (What Doesn't Kill You)" (2012), received three nominations, including Record of the Year and Song of the Year. "Dark Side" (2012) was released as the album's final single. In 2012, Clarkson recorded three songs for her first greatest hits album, Greatest Hits – Chapter One: "Catch My Breath", "Don't Rush" and "People Like Us" (2013), all of which were released as singles. She released her sixth studio album Wrapped in Red in 2013, a Christmas album containing eleven cover versions of Christmas standards and five original songs, two of which—"Underneath the Tree" and "Wrapped in Red" (2014) were issued as singles. Wrapped in Red was followed by her seventh studio album Piece by Piece in 2015, which had the singles "Heartbeat Song", "Invincible" and "Piece by Piece" (2016). Meaning of Life, her first studio album under Atlantic Records, was released in 2017 and included the singles "Love So Soft", "I Don't Think About You", and "Heat". When Christmas Comes Around..., her second album released under Atlantic Records following Meaning of Life, and second Christmas album following Wrapped In Red, and ninth studio album overall was released in 2021. Clarkson's tenth studio album, Chemistry was released in 2023 In 2025, Clarkson started her own record label, High Road Records, and released her first single, "Where Have You Been" as an independent artist.

== Songs ==
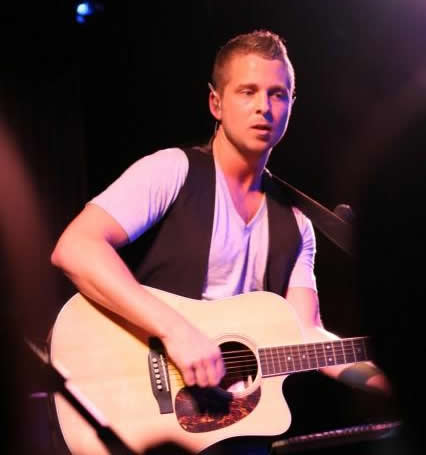
OneRepublic lead singer Ryan Tedder co-wrote the songs "Already Gone", "Impossible", "If I Can't Have You", "Save You", and "Tip of My Tongue". "Already Gone"'s release as a single was met with controversy.

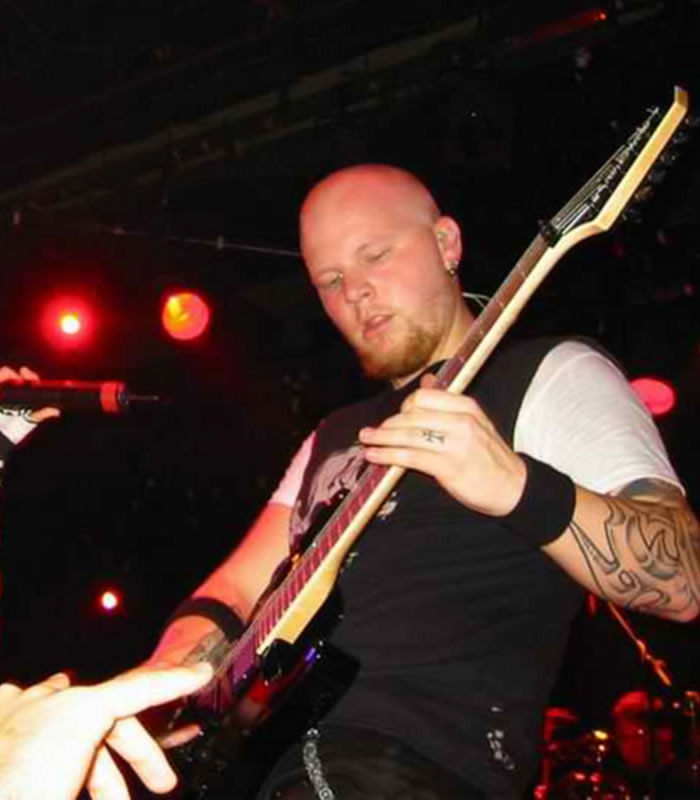
Former Evanescence guitarist Ben Moody co-wrote the songs "Addicted" and "Because of You".

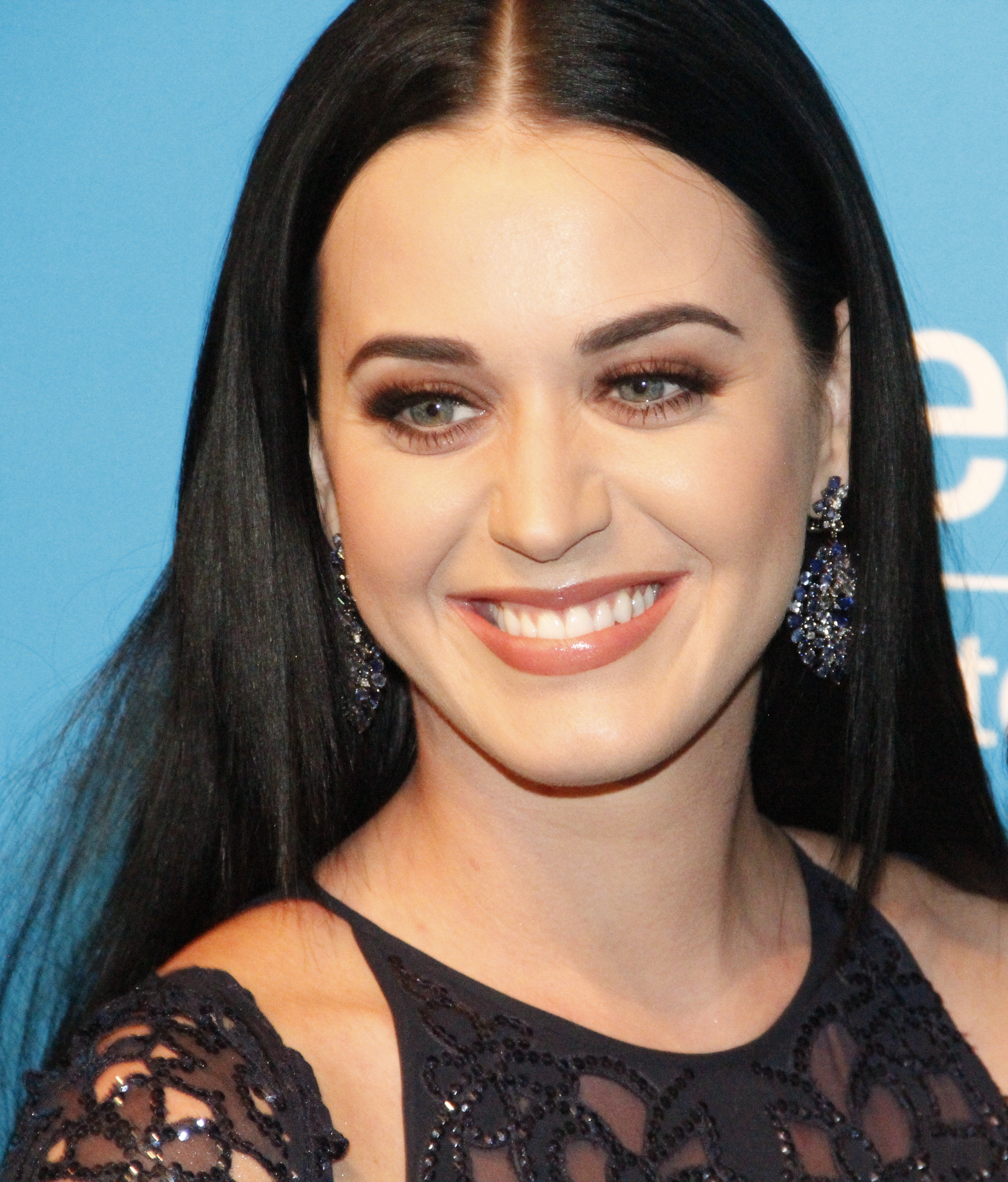
Katy Perry co-wrote the songs "I Do Not Hook Up" and "Long Shot", which were originally recorded by Perry for an unreleased album.

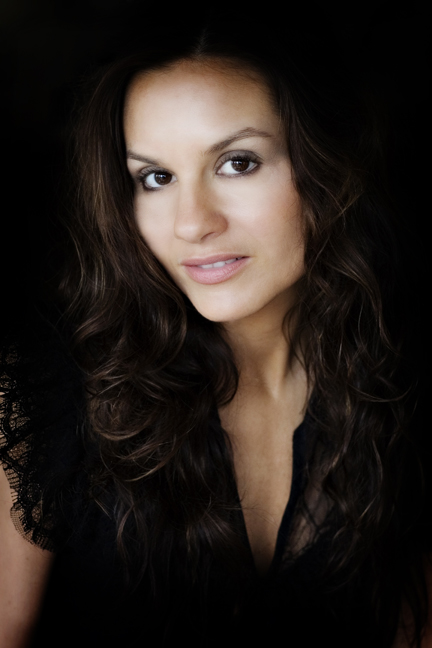
Kara DioGuardi co-wrote six songs with Clarkson on Breakaway, "One Minute" on My December, and "I Do Not Hook Up" on All I Ever Wanted, and "Heartbeat Song" on Piece by Piece. She also appears as a featured artist in "The Sun Will Rise" on Stronger.

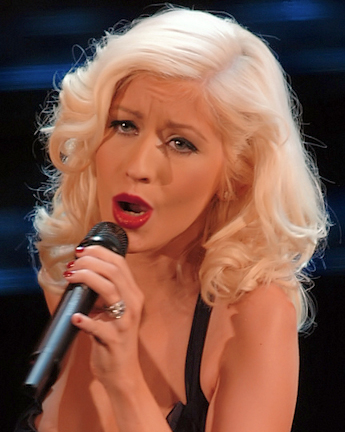
Christina Aguilera co-wrote "Miss Independent" with Clarkson, which was originally recorded as "Miss Independence" for Aguilera's album Stripped (2002).

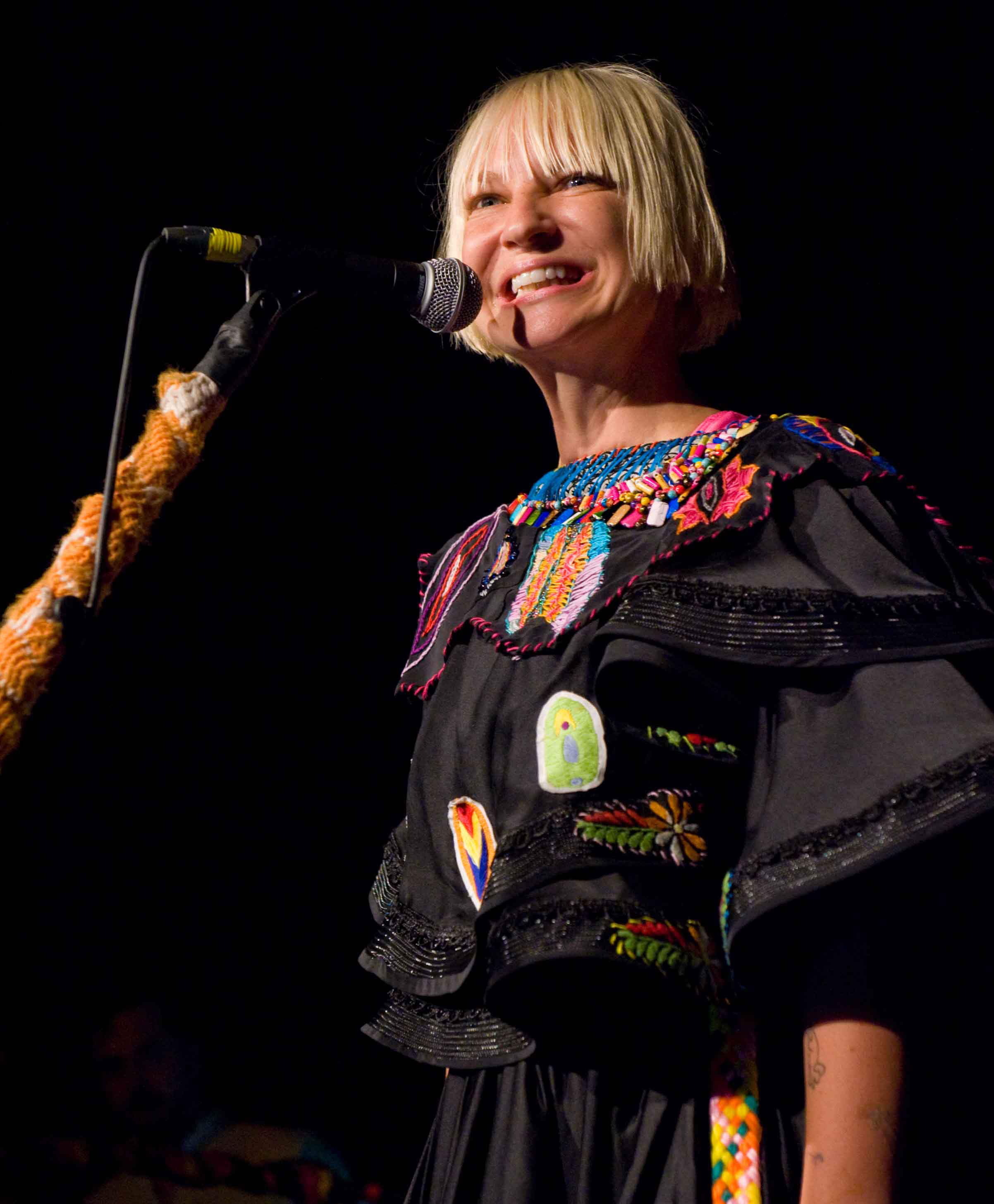
Sia co-wrote "Invincible" and "Let Your Tears Fall" on Piece by Piece.

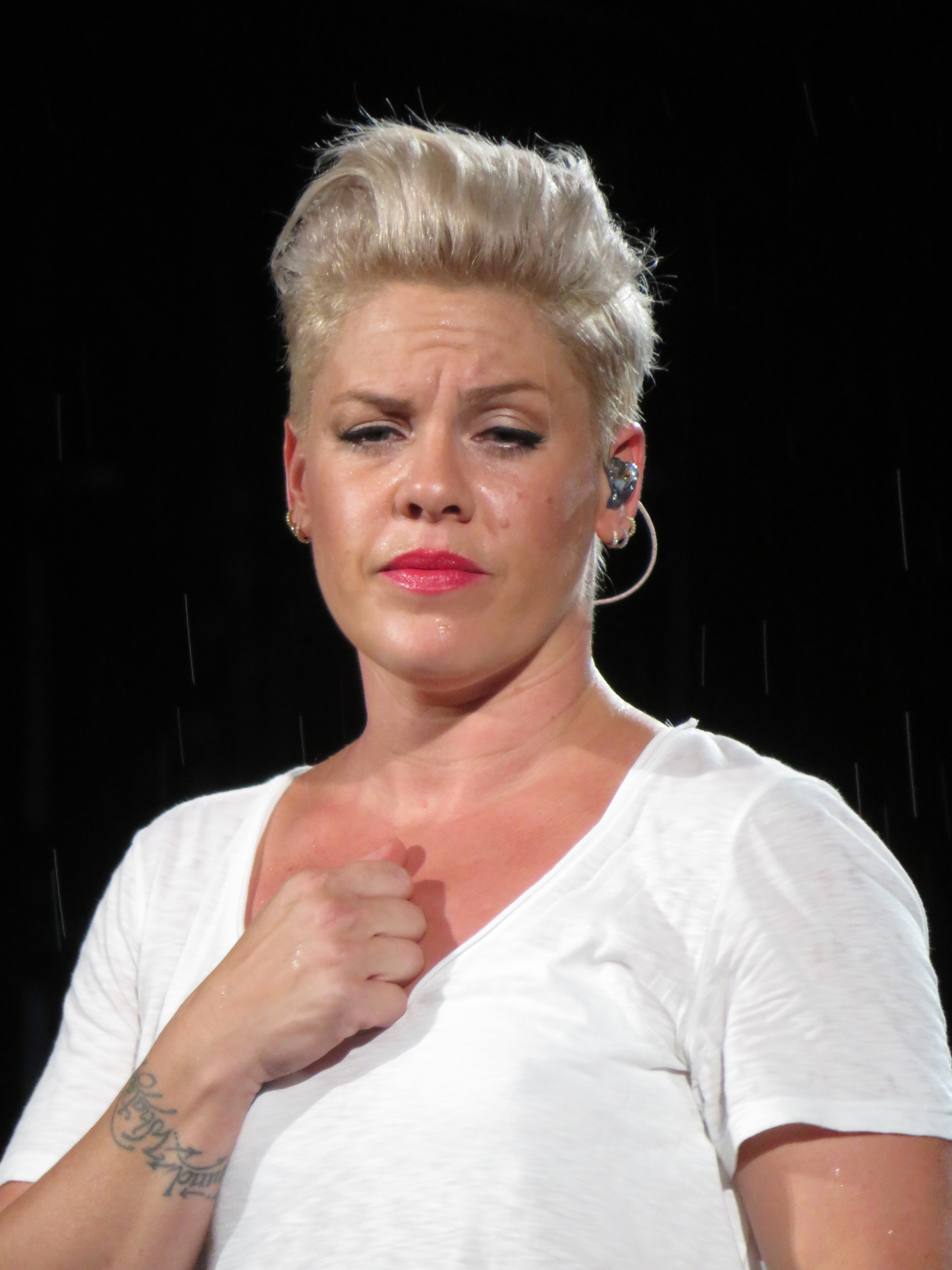
Pink co-wrote "Broken & Beautiful" for the UglyDolls film.

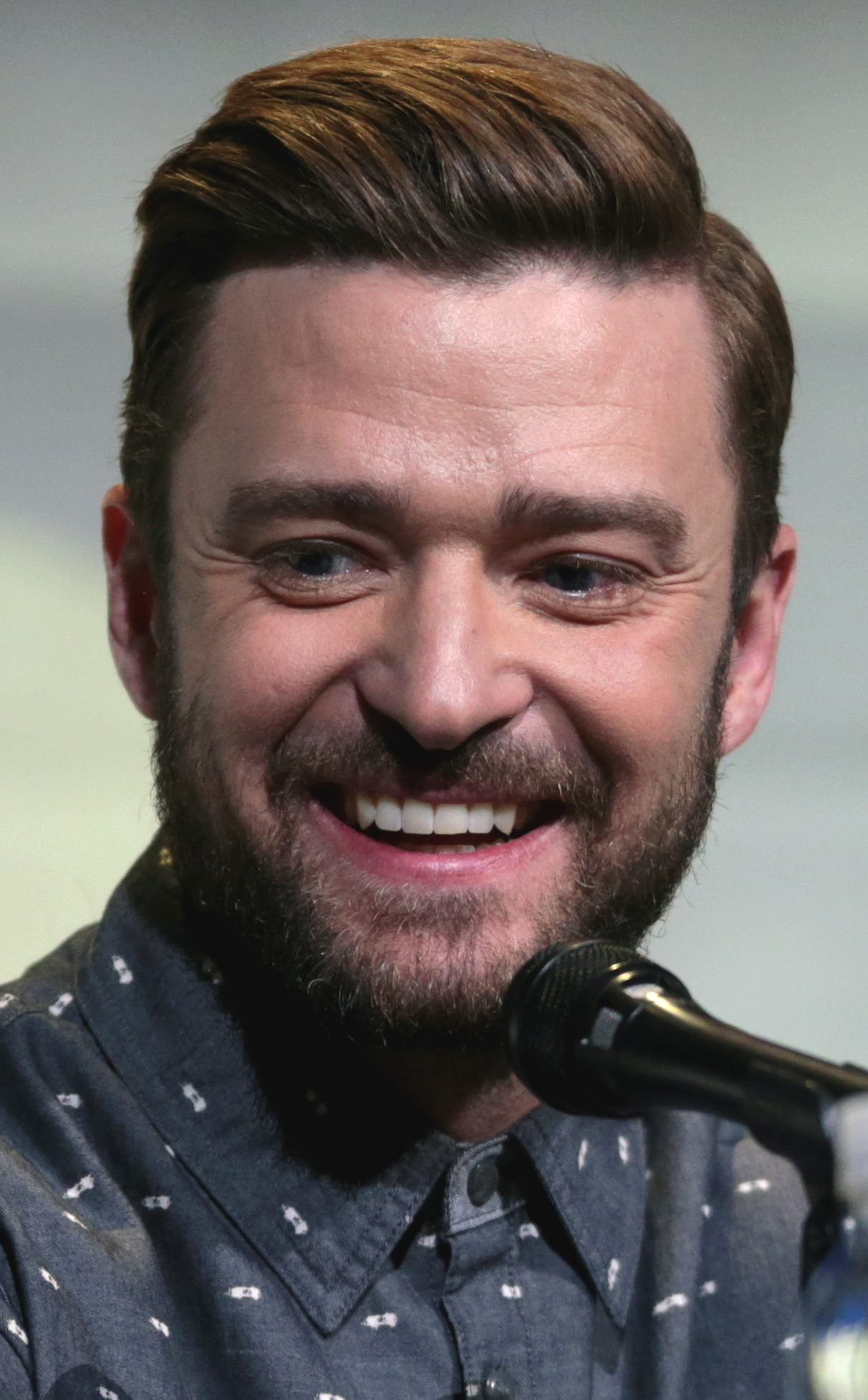
Justin Timberlake co-wrote "Born to Die" and "Just Sing" for the Trolls World Tour film.

Key
†	Indicates single release
#	Indicates promotional single release
‡	Indicates live recording release

List of songs recorded by Kelly Clarkson
Song	Artist(s)	Writer(s)	Original release	Year	Ref.
"4 Carats"	Kelly Clarkson	Kelly Clarkson; Greg Kurstin; Cathy Dennis; Olivia Waithe	Wrapped in Red	2013	
"9 to 5 (From the Still Working 9-5 Documentary)" †	Dolly Parton and Kelly Clarkson	Dolly Parton	—N/a	2022	
"A Minute (Intro)"	Kelly Clarkson	Andre Davidson; Sean Davidson; Jim McCormick; Katie Pearlman	Meaning of Life	2017	
"A Moment Like This" †	Kelly Clarkson	Jörgen Elofsson; John Reid	—N/a^{1}	2002	
"Addicted"	Kelly Clarkson	Kelly Clarkson; David Hodges; Ben Moody	Breakaway	2004	
"All Dolled Up"	Janelle Monáe featuring Kelly Clarkson	Christopher Lennertz; Glenn Slater	UglyDolls: Original Motion Picture Soundtrack	2019	
"All I Ask of You"	Josh Groban with Kelly Clarkson	Andrew Lloyd Webber; Charles Hart; Richard Stilgoe	Stages	2015	
"All I Ever Wanted"†	Kelly Clarkson	Dameon Aranda; Louis Biancaniello; Sam Watters	All I Ever Wanted	2009	
"All I Want For Christmas Is You" †	Kelly Clarkson	Troy Powers; Andy Stone	When Christmas Comes Around...	2020	
"Alone"	Kelly Clarkson	Josh Abraham; Oliver Goldstein; Bonnie McKee; Ryan Williams	Stronger	2011	
"Already Gone" †	Kelly Clarkson	Kelly Clarkson; Ryan Tedder	All I Ever Wanted	2009	
"Anytime"	Kelly Clarkson	Sam Watters; Louis Biancaniello	Thankful	2003	
"Baby, It's Cold Outside"	Kelly Clarkson featuring Ronnie Dunn	Frank Loesser	Wrapped in Red	2013	
"Bad Reputation"	Kelly Clarkson	Kelly Clarkson; Greg Kurstin; Bonnie McKee; Kelly Sheehan	Piece by Piece	2015	
"Be Still"	Kelly Clarkson	Kelly Clarkson; Aben Eubanks	My December	2007	
"Beautiful Disaster"	Kelly Clarkson	Rebekah Jordan; Matthew Wilder	Thankful	2003	
"Because of You" †	Kelly Clarkson	Kelly Clarkson; David Hodges; Ben Moody	Breakaway	2004	
"Before Your Love" †	Kelly Clarkson	Desmond Child; Cathy Dennis	—N/a^{1}	2002	
"Behind These Hazel Eyes" †	Kelly Clarkson	Kelly Clarkson; Lukasz Gottwald; Martin Sandberg	Breakaway	2004	
"The Big Finale"	UglyDolls cast^{5}	Christopher Lennertz; Glenn Slater	UglyDolls: Original Motion Picture Soundtrack	2019	
"Blessed"	Kelly Clarkson	Lindy Robbins; Toby Gad; Nicole Cohen	When Christmas Comes Around...	2021	
"Blue Christmas"	Kelly Clarkson	Billy Hayes; Jay Johnson	Wrapped in Red	2013	
"Born to Die"	Kelly Clarkson	Justin Timberlake; Chris Stapleton	Trolls World Tour: Original Motion Picture Soundtrack	2020	
"Breakaway" †	Kelly Clarkson	Avril Lavigne; Matthew Gerrard; Bridget Benenate	The Princess Diaries 2: Royal Engagement (Original Soundtrack)	2004	
"Breaking Your Own Heart"	Kelly Clarkson	Jennifer Hanson; Michael Logen	Stronger	2011	
"Broken & Beautiful" †	Kelly Clarkson	Alecia Moore; Steve Mac; Johnny McDaid; Marshmello	UglyDolls: Original Motion Picture Soundtrack	2019	
"Can I Have a Kiss"	Kelly Clarkson	Kelly Clarkson; Jimmy Messer; Dwight Baker	My December	2007	
"Can We Go Back"	Kelly Clarkson	Andy Dodd; Adam Watts; Shanna Crooks	All I Ever Wanted	2009	
"Catch My Breath" †	Kelly Clarkson	Kelly Clarkson; Jason Halbert; Eric Olson	Greatest Hits – Chapter One	2012	
"Chemistry"	Kelly Clarkson	Kelly Clarkson; Jesse Shatkin; Erick Serna	Chemistry	2023	
"Chivas"	Kelly Clarkson	Kelly Clarkson; Jimmy Messer	My December	2007	
"Christmas Come Early"	Kelly Clarkson	Bobby Strand; Brock Baker; Molly Kate Kestner; Dave Lubben	When Christmas Comes Around...	2021	
"Christmas Eve" †	Kelly Clarkson	Kelly Clarkson; Jason Halbert	When Christmas Comes Around...^{2}	2017	
"Christmas is a Feeling"	Kelly Clarkson, Ben Schwartz and Home cast	—N/a	Home for the Holidays (Original Soundtrack)	2017	
"Christmas Isn't Canceled (Just You)" †	Kelly Clarkson	Kelly Clarkson; Jason Halbert; Jessi Collins	When Christmas Comes Around...	2021	
"Couldn't Be Better"	Kelly Clarkson^{6}	Christopher Lennertz; Glenn Slater	UglyDolls: Original Motion Picture Soundtrack	2019	
"Creep" ‡	Kelly Clarkson	Radiohead; Albert Hammond; Mike Hazlewood	Kelly Clarkson Live	2016	
"Cruel"	Kelly Clarkson	Andre Davidson; Sean Davidson; Jessica Ashley Karpov; Pat Linehan	Meaning of Life	2017	
"Cry" †	Kelly Clarkson	Kelly Clarkson; Jason Halbert; Mark Lee Townsend	All I Ever Wanted	2009	
"Dance with Me"	Kelly Clarkson	Dan Rockett	Piece by Piece	2015	
"Dark Side" †	Kelly Clarkson	busbee Alex G.	Stronger	2011	
"The Day We Fell Apart"	Kelly Clarkson	Louis Biancaniello; Sam Watters; Andre Harris; Vidal Davis; Harry Zelnick; Alexander Chiger	All I Ever Wanted	2009	
"Didn't I"	Kelly Clarkson	Andre Davidson; Sean Davidson; Audra Mae; Katie Pearlman	Meaning of Life	2017	
"Did You Know"	Kelly Clarkson	Kelly Clarkson; Jesse Shatkin; Chris Kelly; John Ryan; Ruth-Anne Cunnigham	Chemistry	2023	
"Dirty Little Secret"	Kelly Clarkson	Kelly Clarkson; Jimmy Messer	My December	2007	
"Don't Be a Girl About It"	Kelly Clarkson	Kelly Clarkson; Brent Kutzle	Stronger	2011	
"Don't Dream It's Over"	Brynn Cartelli & Kelly Clarkson	Neil Finn	The Complete Season 14 Collection (The Voice Performance)	2018	
"Don't Let Me Stop You"	Kelly Clarkson	Quiz & Larossi; Claude Kelly	All I Ever Wanted	2009	
"Don't Rush" †	Kelly Clarkson featuring Vince Gill	Blu Sanders; Natalie Hemby; Lindsay Chapman	Greatest Hits – Chapter One	2012	
"Don't Waste Your Time" †	Kelly Clarkson	Kelly Clarkson; Jimmy Messer; Malcolm Pardon; Fredrik Rinman	My December	2007	
"Don't You Pretend"	Kelly Clarkson	Kelly Clarkson; Jesse Shatkin; Maureen "Mozella" McDonald	Meaning of Life	2017	
"Don't You Wanna Stay" †	Jason Aldean with Kelly Clarkson	Jason Sellers; Paul Jenkins; Andy Gibson	My Kinda Party	2010	
"Down To You"	Kelly Clarkson	Kelly Clarkson; Jesse Shatkin; Maureen McDonald	Chemistry	2023	
"Einstein"	Kelly Clarkson	Kelly Clarkson; Toby Gad; Bridget Kelly; James Fauntleroy II	Stronger	2011	
"Every Christmas"	Kelly Clarkson	Kelly Clarkson; Aben Eubanks	Wrapped in Red	2013	
"Fading"	Kelly Clarkson	Kelly Clarkson; Malcolm Pardon; Fredrik Rinman; David Kahne	My December	2007	
"Favorite Kind of High" †	Kelly Clarkson	Kelly Clarkson; Carly Rae Jepsen; Jesse Shatkin	Chemistry	2023	
"Fix You" ‡	Kelly Clarkson	Chris Martin; Jonny Buckland; Guy Berryman; Will Champion	Kelly Clarkson Live	2016	
"Foolish Games"	Jewel featuring Kelly Clarkson	Jewel Kilcher	Greatest Hits	2013	
"From the Jump" †	James Arthur featuring Kelly Clarkson	James Arthur	Bitter Sweet Love	2024	
"Get Up (A Cowboys Anthem)" #	Kelly Clarkson	Kelly Clarkson; Josh Abraham; Oliver Goldstein; Ryan Williams	—N/a^{2}	2012	
"Glow" †	Kelly Clarkson with Chris Stapleton	Kelly Clarkson; Danja; Jason Halbert; Hayley Warner; Jesse Thomas	When Christmas Comes Around...	2021	
"Go" #	Kelly Clarkson	Kelly Clarkson; Rhett Lawrence; Suzie Benson	—N/a^{2}	2006	
"Go High"	Kelly Clarkson	Kelly Clarkson; Jesse Shatkin; Maureen "Mozella" McDonald	Meaning of Life	2017	
"Goodbye"	Kelly Clarkson	Kelly Clarkson; Jason Halbert	Chemistry	2023	
"Good Goes the Bye"	Kelly Clarkson	Natalie Hemby; Shane McAnally; Jimmy Robbins	Piece by Piece	2015	
"Gone"	Kelly Clarkson	Kara DioGuardi; John Shanks	Breakaway	2004	
"Happier Than Ever"	Kelly Clarkson	Billie Eilish; Finneas O'Connell	Kellyoke	2022	
"Haunted"	Kelly Clarkson	Kelly Clarkson; Jimmy Messer; Jason Halbert	My December	2007	
"Have Yourself a Merry Little Christmas"	Kelly Clarkson	Ralph Blane; Hugh Martin	Wrapped in Red	2013	
"Hear Me"	Kelly Clarkson	Kelly Clarkson; Kara DioGuardi; Cliff Magness	Breakaway	2004	
"Heartbeat Song" †	Kelly Clarkson	Kara DioGuardi; Audra Mae; Jason Evigan; Mitch Allan	Piece by Piece	2015	
"Heat" †	Kelly Clarkson	Andre Davidson; Sean Davidson; Jessica Ashley Karpov; Michael Pollack; Mick Schultz	Meaning of Life	2017	
"Hello"	Kelly Clarkson	Kelly Clarkson; Josh Abraham; Oliver Goldstein; Bonnie McKee	Stronger	2011	
"Honestly"	Kelly Clarkson	Tom Shapiro; Robert Marvin; Catt Gravitt	Stronger	2011	
"High Road"	Kelly Clarkson	Rachel Orschern; Justin Womble	Chemistry	2023	
"Hole"	Kelly Clarkson	Kelly Clarkson; Jimmy Messer; Dwight Baker	My December	2007	
"How I Feel"	Kelly Clarkson	Kelly Clarkson; Jimmy Messer; Dwight Baker	My December	2007	
"I Can't Make You Love Me"	Kelly Clarkson	Mike Reid; Allen Shamblin	The Smoakstack Sessions	2011	
"I Dare You" †	Kelly Clarkson	Jesse Shatkin; Jeff Gitelman; Natalie Hemby; Laura Velt; Ben West	—N/a	2020	
"I Do Not Hook Up" †	Kelly Clarkson	Katy Perry; Kara DioGuardi; Greg Wells; Jesse Shatkin; Jeff Gitelman; Natalie Hemby; Laura Velt; Ben West	All I Ever Wanted	2009	
"I Don't Think About You" †	Kelly Clarkson	Andre Davidson; Sean Davidson; Jessica Ashley Karpov; Michael Pollack	Meaning of Life	2017	
"I Dream in Southern"	Kaleb Lee featuring Kelly Clarkson	Brandy Clark; Shane McAnally; Josh Osborne	—N/a^{2}	2019	
"I Forgive You"	Kelly Clarkson	Rodney Jerkins; Andre Lindal; Lauren Christy	Stronger	2011	
"I Had a Dream"	Kelly Clarkson	Kelly Clarkson; Greg Kurstin	Piece by Piece	2015	
"I Hate Love"	Kelly Clarkson featuring Steve Martin	Kelly Clarkson; Jesse Shatkin; Nick Jonas	Chemistry	2023	
"I Hate Myself for Losing You"	Kelly Clarkson	Kelly Clarkson; Jimmy Harry; Shep Solomon	Breakaway	2004	
"I Never Loved a Man"	Kelly Clarkson	Ronnie Shannon	The Smoakstack Sessions Vol. 2	2012	
"I Want You"	Kelly Clarkson	Kelly Clarkson; Joakim Åhlund	All I Ever Wanted	2009	
"I Won't Give Up"	Kelly Clarkson	Kelly Clarkson; Jesse Shatkin; Jessica Karpov; Max Wolfgang; Peter Townsend	Chemistry	2023	
"I'd Rather Go Blind" ‡	Kelly Clarkson	Etta James; Ellington Jordan; Billy Foster	Kelly Clarkson Live	2016	
"If I Can't Have You"	Kelly Clarkson	Kelly Clarkson; Ryan Tedder	All I Ever Wanted	2009	
"If No One Will Listen"	Kelly Clarkson	Keri Noble	All I Ever Wanted	2009	
"If I Were You"	Terri Clark featuring Kelly Clarkson	Terri Clark	Take Two	2024	
"I'd Be Lyin'" †	Kelly Clarkson	Kelly Clarkson; Jason Halbert; Jaco Caraco	—N/a	2026	
"I'll Be Home for Christmas" #	Kelly Clarkson	Kim Gannon; Walter Kent; Buck Ram	iTunes Session	2011	
"I'm Movin' On"	Rascal Flatts with Kelly Clarkson	Phillip White; D. Vincent Williams	Life Is a Highway: Refueled Duets	2025	
"I've Loved You Since Forever" #	Kelly Clarkson & Hoda Kotb	Kelly Clarkson	—N/a^{2}	2018	
"Impossible"	Kelly Clarkson	Kelly Clarkson; Ryan Tedder	All I Ever Wanted	2009	
"In the Basement"	Martina McBride featuring Kelly Clarkson	Billy Davis; Carl Williams Smith; Raynard Miner	Everlasting	2014	
"In the Blue"	Kelly Clarkson	Kelly Clarkson; Jesse Shatkin; Anjulie Persaud; Fransisca Hall	Piece by Piece	2015	
"Invincible" †	Kelly Clarkson	Sia Furler; Jesse Shatkin; Warren "Oak" Felder; Stephen Mostyn	Piece by Piece	2015	
"It's Beginning to Look a Lot Like Christmas"	Kelly Clarkson	Meredith Willson	When Christmas Comes Around...	2021	
"It's Quiet Uptown" #	Kelly Clarkson	Lin-Manuel Miranda	The Hamilton Mixtape	2016	
"Irvine"	Kelly Clarkson	Kelly Clarkson; Aben Eubanks	My December	2007	
"Jingle Bell Rock"	Kelly Clarkson	Joseph Beal; James Ross Boothe	When Christmas Comes Around...	2021	
"Judas"	Kelly Clarkson	Kelly Clarkson; Jimmy Messer; Dwight Baker	My December	2007	
"Just for Now"	Kelly Clarkson	Imogen Heap^{4}	Wrapped in Red	2013	
"Just Missed the Train"	Kelly Clarkson	Danielle Brisebois; Scott Cutler	Thankful	2003	
"Just Sing"	Trolls World Tour cast^{7}	Justin Timberlake; Ludwig Göransson; Max Martin; Sarah Aarons	Trolls World Tour: Original Motion Picture Soundtrack	2020	
"Keeping Score" #	Dan + Shay featuring Kelly Clarkson	Dan Smyers; Jordan Reynolds; Laura Veltz	Dan + Shay	2018	
"Kiss" ‡	Kelly Clarkson	Prince	Spotify Singles	2017	
"Last Christmas"	Kelly Clarkson	George Michael	When Christmas Comes Around...	2021	
"Let Me Down"	Kelly Clarkson	Kelly Clarkson; Chris DeStefano	Stronger	2011	
"Let Your Tears Fall"	Kelly Clarkson	Sia Furler; Greg Kurstin	Piece by Piece	2015	
"Lies"	Kelly Clarkson	The Black Keys	The Smoakstack Sessions Vol. 2	2012	
"Lighthouse" †	Kelly Clarkson	Kelly Clarkson; Jesse Shatkin; Aben Eubanks	Chemistry	2023	
"Little Green Apples"	Robbie Williams featuring Kelly Clarkson	Bobby Russell	Swings Both Ways	2013	
"Long Shot"	Kelly Clarkson	Katy Perry; Glen Ballard; Matt Thiessen	All I Ever Wanted	2009	
"Love Goes On"	Kelly Clarkson and Aloe Blacc	Egbert Nathaniel Dawkins III; Tom Barnes; Ben Kohn; Peter Kelleher; James Allen	The Shack (Music from and Inspired by the Original Motion Picture)	2017	
"Love Me Like a Man" ‡	Kelly Clarkson	Bonnie Raitt; Chris Smither	Kelly Clarkson Live	2016	
"Love So Soft" †	Kelly Clarkson	Jesse Shatkin; Priscilla Renea; Maureen "Mozella" McDonald	Meaning of Life	2017	
"Low" †	Kelly Clarkson	Jimmy Harry	Thankful	2003	
"Magic"	Kelly Clarkson	Kelly Clarkson; Jesse Shatkin; Randy Runyon	Chemistry	2023	
"Me" †	Kelly Clarkson	Kelly Clarkson; Taylor Rutherford; Josh Ronen	Chemistry	2023	
"Meaning of Life" #	Kelly Clarkson	Jesse Shatkin; Ilsey Juber; James Morrison Catchpole	Meaning of Life	2017	
"Medicine"	Kelly Clarkson	Jessica Ashley Karpov; Mick Schultz	Meaning of Life	2017	
"Merry Christmas Baby"	Kelly Clarkson	Kelly Clarkson; Aben Eubanks	When Christmas Comes Around...	2021	
"Merry Christmas (To the One I Used to Know)"	Kelly Clarkson	Kelly Clarkson; Aben Eubanks; Jason Halbert	When Christmas Comes Around...	2021	
"Mine" †	Kelly Clarkson	Kelly Clarkson; Eric Serna; Jesse Shatkin	Chemistry	2023	
"Miss Independent" †	Kelly Clarkson	Kelly Clarkson; Christina Aguilera; Rhett Lawrence; Matt Morris	Thankful	2003	
"Move You" †	Kelly Clarkson	Molly Kate Kestner; Amy Kuney; Nick Ruth	Meaning of Life	2017	
"Mr. Know It All" †	Kelly Clarkson	Brian Seals; Ester Dean; Brett James; Dante Jones	Stronger	2011	
"My Favorite Things"	Kelly Clarkson	Richard Rodgers; Oscar Hammerstein II	Wrapped in Red	2013	
"My Grown Up Christmas List"	Kelly Clarkson	David Foster; Linda Thompson-Jenner; Amy Grant	American Idol: Great Holiday Classics	2003	
"My Life Would Suck Without You" †	Kelly Clarkson	Luke Gottwald; Claude Kelly; Max Martin	All I Ever Wanted	2009	
"(You Make Me Feel Like) A Natural Woman"	Kelly Clarkson	Gerry Goffin; Carole King; Jerry Wexler	American Idol: Greatest Moments	2002	
"My Mistake"	Kelly Clarkson	Jesse Shatkin; Alex Hope; Sean Douglas	Chemistry	2023	
"Never Again" †	Kelly Clarkson	Kelly Clarkson; Jimmy Messer	My December	2007	
"Never Enough"	Kelly Clarkson	Benj Pasek; Justin Paul	The Greatest Showman – Reimagined	2018	
"Nostalgic"	Kelly Clarkson	Justin Tranter; Dan Keyes; Ryland Blackinton; Vaughn Oliver	Piece by Piece	2015	
"Not Today"	Kelly Clarkson	Kelly Clarkson; Jimmy Messer; David Kahne	My December	2007	
"Oh Come, Oh Come Emmanuel"	Kelly Clarkson	Traditional	Wrapped in Red	2013	
"Oh Darling" ‡	Kelly Clarkson	John Lennon; Paul McCartney	Kelly Clarkson Live	2016	
"Oh Holy Night"	Kelly Clarkson	Adolphe Adam; Placide Cappeau	American Idol: Great Holiday Classics	2003	
"One Minute" †	Kelly Clarkson	Kelly Clarkson; Kara DioGuardi; Chantal Kreviazuk; Raine Maida	My December	2007	
"People Like Us" †	Kelly Clarkson	Blair Daly; James Michael; Meghan Kabir	Greatest Hits – Chapter One	2012	
"Piece by Piece" †	Kelly Clarkson	Kelly Clarkson; Greg Kurstin	Piece by Piece	2015	
"Please Come Home for Christmas (Bells Will Be Ringing)"	Kelly Clarkson	Charles Brown; Gene Redd	Wrapped in Red	2013	
"Pray for Peace"	Reba McEntire^{3}	Reba McEntire	Love Somebody	2015	
"PrizeFighter" †	Trisha Yearwood featuring Kelly Clarkson	Jessi Alexander; Sarah Buxton; Ross Copperman	PrizeFighter: Hit After Hit	2014	
"Ready"	Kelly Clarkson	Kelly Clarkson; Aben Eubanks; Jason Halbert	All I Ever Wanted	2009	
"Ready for Love" ‡	Kelly Clarkson	India Arie Simpson; William Mueller	Kelly Clarkson Live	2016	
"Red Flag Collector"	Kelly Clarkson	Kelly Clarkson; Jesse Shatkin	Chemistry	2023	
"Respect"	Kelly Clarkson	Otis Redding	American Idol: Greatest Moments	2002	
"River Rose's Magical Lullaby"	Kelly Clarkson	Kelly Clarkson	—N/a^{2}	2016	
"Rock Hudson"	Kelly Clarkson	Kelly Clarkson; Jesse Shatkin	Chemistry	2023	
"Rockin' Around the Christmas Tree"	Kelly Clarkson	Johnny Marks	When Christmas Comes Around...	2021	
"Rockin' with the Rhythm of the Rain"	Chevel Shepherd & Kelly Clarkson	Brent Maher; Don Schlitz	The Complete Season 15 Collection (The Voice Performance)	2018	
"Roses"	Kelly Clarkson	Kelly Clarkson; Jesse Shatkin; Sean Douglas; Amy Allen	Chemistry	2023	
"Run Run Rudolph"	Kelly Clarkson	Johnny Marks; Marvin Brodie	Wrapped in Red	2013	
"Run Run Run" #	Kelly Clarkson featuring John Legend	Joacim Persson; Ry Cuming; David Jost; Tim James; Antonina Armato	Piece by Piece	2015	
"Santa Baby"	Kelly Clarkson	Joan Jatvis; Philip Springer	When Christmas Comes Around...	2021	
"Santa, Can't You Hear Me" #	Kelly Clarkson featuring Ariana Grande	Kelly Clarkson; Aben Eubanks	When Christmas Comes Around...	2021	
"Save You"	Kelly Clarkson	Aimée Proal; Ryan Tedder	All I Ever Wanted	2009	
"Second Hand Heart" †	Ben Haenow featuring Kelly Clarkson	Joe Kirkland; Ian Franzino; Jason Dean; Andrew Haas; Neil Ormandy	Ben Haenow	2015	
"Second Wind"	Kelly Clarkson	Shane McAnally; Chris DeStefano; Maren Morris	Piece by Piece	2015	
"Shake It Out" ‡	Kelly Clarkson	Florence Welch; Paul Epworth	Kelly Clarkson Live	2016	
"Silent Night" #	Kelly Clarkson featuring Reba and Trisha Yearwood	Traditional	Wrapped in Red	2013	
"Since U Been Gone" †	Kelly Clarkson	Lukasz Gottwald; Martin Sandberg	Breakaway	2004	
"Skip This Part"	Kelly Clarkson	Kelly Clarkson; Jason Halbert	Chemistry	2023	
"Slow Dance"	Kelly Clarkson	Nick Ruth; Amy Kuney; Molly Kate Kestner	Meaning of Life	2017	
"Sober" †	Kelly Clarkson	Kelly Clarkson; Aben Eubanks; Calamity McEntire; Jimmy Messer	My December	2007	
"Softly and Tenderly" †	Reba McEntire featuring Kelly Clarkson and Trisha Yearwood	Traditional	Sing It Now: Songs of Faith & Hope	2016	
"Some Kind of Miracle"	Kelly Clarkson	Diane Warren	Thankful	2003	
"Someone" #	Kelly Clarkson	Matthew Koma	Piece by Piece	2015	
"Standing in Front of You"	Kelly Clarkson	Kelly Clarkson; Aben Eubanks	Stronger	2011	
"The Sun Will Rise"	Kelly Clarkson featuring Kara DioGuardi	Kyle Jacobs; Danelle Leverett	Stronger	2011	
"Sweet December"	Brett Eldredge featuring Kelly Clarkson	Brett Eldredge; Alexis Kessleman	Merry Christmas (Welcome to the Family)	2024	
"Take You High" #	Kelly Clarkson	Jesse Shatkin; Maureen "MoZella" McDonald	Piece by Piece	2015	
"Tell Me Something I Don't Know"	Trisha Yearwood featuring Kelly Clarkson	Gordie Sampson; Lucie Silvas; Troy Verges	Every Girl	2019	
"Thankful"	Kelly Clarkson	Kelly Clarkson; Kenneth Edmonds; Harvey Mason, Jr. Damon Thomas	Thankful	2003	
"That I Would Be Good/Use Somebody"	Kelly Clarkson	Alanis Morissette; Glen Ballard ("That I Would Be Good"); Kings of Leon ("Use Somebody")	The Smoakstack Sessions Vol. 2	2012	
"That's Right"	Kelly Clarkson featuring Sheila E.	Kelly Clarkson; Jesse Shatkin; Erick Serna	Chemistry	2023	
"There's a New Kid in Town"	Blake Shelton featuring Kelly Clarkson	Don Cook; Curly Putman; Keith Whitley	Cheers, It's Christmas	2012	
"This is for My Girls"	Kelly Clarkson, Chloe x Halle, Missy Elliott, Jadagrace, Lea Michele, Janelle Monáe, Kelly Rowland, Zendaya	Dianne Warren	—N/a^{2}	2016	
"Tie It Up" †	Kelly Clarkson	Ashley Arrison; Shane McAnally; Josh Osborne	—N/a^{2}	2013	
"Tightrope"	Kelly Clarkson	Kelly Clarkson; Greg Kurstin	Piece by Piece	2015	
"Timeless"	Justin Guarini with Kelly Clarkson	Bagge & Peer; Henrik Norberg; Karen Poole; Oscar Merner	Justin Guarini	2003	
"Tip of My Tongue"	Kelly Clarkson	Kelly Clarkson; Ryan Tedder	All I Ever Wanted	2009	
"Today's the Day"	Kelly Clarkson	Christopher Lennertz; Glenn Slater	UglyDolls: Original Motion Picture Soundtrack	2019	
"Today's the (Perfect) Day"	UglyDolls cast^{5}	Christopher Lennertz; Glenn Slater	UglyDolls: Original Motion Picture Soundtrack	2019	
"Top of the World" ‡	Kelly Clarkson	Patty Griffin	Kelly Clarkson Live	2016	
"The Trouble With Love Is" †	Kelly Clarkson	Kelly Clarkson; Carl Sturken; Evan Rogers	Thankful	2003	
"Trying to Help You Out"	Ashley Arrison^{3}	Kelly Clarkson; Ashley Arrison	Hearts on Parade	2010	
"Unbreakable"	Janelle Monáe and Kelly Clarkson	Christopher Lennertz; Glenn Slater; Keith Harrison; Laura Harrison	UglyDolls: Original Motion Picture Soundtrack	2019	
"Under the Mistletoe" †	Kelly Clarkson and Brett Eldredge	Kelly Clarkson; Aben Eubanks	When Christmas Comes Around...	2020	
"Underneath the Tree" †	Kelly Clarkson	Kelly Clarkson; Greg Kurstin	Wrapped in Red	2013	
"Up to the Mountain" #	Kelly Clarkson featuring Jeff Beck	Patty Griffin	—N/a^{2}	2007	
"Walk Away" †	Kelly Clarkson	Kelly Clarkson; Kara DioGuardi; Chantal Kreviazuk; Raine Maida	Breakaway	2004	
"Walk Away Joe" ‡	Kelly Clarkson	Vince Melamed; Greg Barnhill	Kelly Clarkson Live	2016	
"Walking After Midnight"	Kelly Clarkson	Alan Block; Donn Hecht	The Smoakstack Sessions Vol. 2	2012	
"The War Is Over"	Kelly Clarkson	Toby Gad; Olivia Waithe	Stronger	2011	
"War Paint"	Kelly Clarkson	Nolan Lambroza; Joleen Belle; Julia Michaels	Piece by Piece	2015	
"What Doesn't Kill You (Stronger)" †	Kelly Clarkson	Jörgen Elofsson; Ali Tamposi; David Gamson; Greg Kurstin	Stronger	2011	
"What's Up Lonely"	Kelly Clarkson	Carl Sturken and Evan Rogers; Stephanie Saraco	Thankful	2003	
"White Christmas" #	Kelly Clarkson	Irving Berlin	Wrapped in Red	2013	
"Where Is Your Heart"	Kelly Clarkson	Kelly Clarkson; Kara DioGuardi; Chantal Kreviazuk	Breakaway	2004	
"Where Have You Been" †	Kelly Clarkson	Kelly Clarkson; Jaco Caraco	—N/a	2025	
"Whole Lotta Woman"	Kelly Clarkson	Kelly Clarkson; Jussi Karvinen; Denisia "Blu June" Andrews; Brittany "Chi" Coney; Evon Barnes Jr. Jesse Shatkin	Meaning of Life	2017	
"Why Don't You Try"	Kelly Clarkson	Eric Hutchinson	Stronger	2011	
"Whyyawannabringmedown"	Kelly Clarkson	Dameon Aranda; Louis Biancaniello; Sam Watters	All I Ever Wanted	2009	
"Wide Open Spaces" ‡	Kelly Clarkson	Susan Gibson	Kelly Clarkson Live	2016	
"Winter Dreams (Brandon's Song)"	Kelly Clarkson	Kelly Clarkson; Ashley Arrison; Aben Eubanks	Wrapped in Red	2013	
"Wintersong"	Jake Hoot and Kelly Clarkson	Sarah McLachlan	The Complete Season 17 Collection (The Voice Performance)	2019	
"Would You Call that Love"	Kelly Clarkson	Kelly Clarkson; Greg Kurstin	Meaning of Life	2017	
"Wrapped in Red" †	Kelly Clarkson	Kelly Clarkson; Ashley Arrison; Aben Eubanks; Shane McAnally	Wrapped in Red	2013	
"Yeah"	Kelly Clarkson	Kelly Clarkson; Jimmy Messer; Malcolm Pardon; Fredrik Rinman	My December	2007	
"You Can't Win"	Kelly Clarkson	Kelly Clarkson; Josh Abraham; Oliver Goldstein; Felix Bloxsom	Stronger	2011	
"You Don't Make Me Cry"	Kelly Clarkson featuring River Rose	Kelly Clarkson; Jesse Shatkin	Chemistry	2023	
"You For Christmas" †	Kelly Clarkson	Kelly Clarkson; Mark Ronson; Andrew Wyatt	When Christmas Comes Around...	2024	
"You Found Me"	Kelly Clarkson	Kara DioGuardi; John Shanks	Breakaway	2004	
"You Love Me"	Kelly Clarkson	Kelly Clarkson; Josh Abraham; Oliver Goldstein	Stronger	2011	
"You Thought Wrong"	Kelly Clarkson featuring Tamyra Gray	Kelly Clarkson; Kenneth Edmonds; Tamyra Gray; Harvey Mason, Jr. Damon Thomas	Thankful	2003	
"Your Cheatin' Heart"	Kelly Clarkson	Hank Williams	The Smoakstack Sessions Vol. 2	2012	

== Further information ==
- "Kelly Clarkson: Songs". Allmusic. Rovi Corporation.
- "Kelly Clarkson – Songs". Billboard. Prometheus Global Media.
