= Meaning of Life Tour =

2019 concert tour by Kelly Clarkson

- Tour by Kelly Clarkson
- Promotional poster
- Location: United States
- Associated album: Meaning of Life
- Start date: January 24, 2019
- End date: March 30, 2019
- No. of shows: 28
- Box office: $17.5 million

Kelly Clarkson concert chronology
- Piece by Piece Tour (2015); Meaning of Life Tour (2019); Chemistry: An Intimate Evening with Kelly Clarkson (2023–2024)

The Meaning of Life Tour was the eighth headlining concert tour from American pop singer Kelly Clarkson. Her first tour in three and a half years, it supported her eighth studio album Meaning of Life (2017). The tour began in Oakland, California on January 24, 2019, and concluded on March 30, 2019, in Greenville, South Carolina, visiting arenas in various cities across the United States. This was Clarkson's highest grossing tour to date.

== Background ==
Clarkson had previously declared her intention for a concert tour to support her eighth studio album Meaning of Life, which was her first album release with Atlantic Records. Before the conclusion of the fourteenth season of The Voice and hosting the 2018 Billboard Music Awards, Clarkson revealed the tour was being "routed". On September 14, 2018, she announced tour dates with her supporting acts Kelsea Ballerini and Brynn Cartelli (winner of The Voice's fourteen season from Clarkson's team), who joined her in a rendition of the album's titular track. Clarkson remarked in a statement, "Even while recording it, I couldn't wait for people to experience the music live, to not only hear it, but feel it. It has taken almost a year of planning, and I can't wait to see y'all on the road!".

Clarkson had four to five wardrobe changes, two of them being major, and each night a portion of each show was live streamed. As well as bringing Byrnn Cartelli on tour, Clarkson also brought one of her other The Voice season fourteen contestants, D.R. King. He was singing background vocals for her.

== Show ==
The show began with the venue becoming dark and clips of Clarkson's past hits playing. Clarkson then rose up to the stage wearing a black and red ballgown, and with a spotlight on her, she sang her first single "A Moment Like This" a cappella. The show closed with her well-known hit "Since U Been Gone". In between she performed tracks off her latest album Meaning of Life, past singles, past album tracks, and covers. A portion of each show was live streamed on her Facebook page. The segment is named after her Facebook live webisodes and song: "A Minute and a Glass of Wine". Clarkson’s backup singers started off singing the song "A Minute and a Glass of Wine", with Clarkson coming out shortly after and finishing it. She then covered a song that she picked (replacing "Fan Requests" from her past two tours). Some nights, she brought out a special guest (either a musical artist or someone who has done good) to give a sneak peek of what her upcoming talk show The Kelly Clarkson Show will be like (I.E. During opening night in Oakland, she brought out Allyn Pierce a nurse who during the Camp Fire (2018) made a heroic effort by driving in the fire to rescue people and at the Nashville show Clarkson's good friend Reba McEntire was her guest, and the two performed a medley of songs). For "Miss Independent", she brought Kelsea Ballerini and Brynn Cartelli out on stage to sing the song with her.

=== VIP section ===
For this tour Clarkson had a VIP/bar stage, "A Minute + A Glass of Wine...Bar Experience" where the bar surrounded the b-stage. VIP ticket holders received things like a drink ticket, one merchandise gift signed by Clarkson, custom signed wine glasses, an invitation to the 'Meaning of Life' Lounge, and more.

== Critical reception ==
Jim Harrington of The Mercury News says, "The concert reached the next level with the fourth selection, "Love So Soft," a standout rocker from "Meaning of Life" that shows just how much soul Clarkson can bring to the party when she has the right material to work with." And "Part of what makes Clarkson so impactful on stage is her sincerity. She comes across as someone you can trust, and even more so, someone who you'd want to hang out with." Daily Herald journalist Sarah Harris, who attended the Salt Lake City show said that Clarkson brought down the house. Emily Gardiner of the Deseret News said, "Clarkson hasn't missed a step during her three-year hiatus from touring.", and that her "voice carried the same power and soul that fans have loved since her "American Idol" win back in 2002, reminding the audience just how incredible her voice sounds live." Tulsa World's Jimmie Tramel said, "She didn't just sing to the audience. She connected. You've probably been to a concert where unnamed superstar artist came off as trying to be some sort of higher species. Clarkson, born and raised in Texas, was engaging in a manner that made you feel like she was just glad to be barefoot and hanging out with her Oklahoma peeps."

Kendra Meinert of the Green Bay Press-Gazette said, "There was never a moment during her hour-and-45-minute show that the crowd of about 7,000 wasn't with her every step of the way, from the synchronized jumping up and down during "Stronger" to the heartbreak of "a Piece by Piece" with a lone acoustic guitar to a rendition of "Happy Birthday" for a 14-year-old fan in the crowd." Althea Legaspi of the Chicago Tribune said, "Clarskon was savvy in mostly culling crowd pleasers delivered with a down home approach driven home with her easy banter." and "her beguiling voice and personality were more than enough to fill the arena.". Thor Christensen of Guide Live who attended the Dallas show said, "Clarkson proved just how much grit she has in her gymnastic soprano. Her voice was in brilliant form all night."

== Commercial performance ==
This was Clarkson's highest grossing tour to date, grossing $17,490,910, and selling over 275,000 tickets. All twenty-eight shows were sold out. This tour surpassed her previous highest grossing tours; The Breakaway Tour and Addicted Tour.

== Set list ==
This set list is from the January 24, 2019, show in Oakland, California. It does not represent every show.

1. "A Moment Like This"
2. "Meaning of Life"
3. "Walk Away"
4. "Love So Soft"
5. "Whole Lotta Woman"
6. "Behind These Hazel Eyes"
7. "Piece by Piece"
8. "Breakaway"
9. Medley: "Because of You" / "Just Missed The Train" / "Beautiful Disaster" / "Sober" / "Good Goes the Bye" / "Would You Call That Love"
10. A Minute" (interlude)
11. "Tin Man"
12. "Run Run Run" (with D.R. King)
13. "Move You"
14. "My Life Would Suck Without You"
15. "Heat"
16. "Heartbeat Song"
17. "Miss Independent"

Encore

18. "It's Quiet Uptown"
19. "Never Enough"
20. "Stronger (What Doesn't Kill You)"
21. "Since U Been Gone"

=== Additional notes ===
- "Miss Independent" was performed with Kelsea Ballerini and Brynn Cartelli. However, during the March 9, 14, and 15 concerts in Allentown, and Uncasville, Clarkson and Cartelli performed the song with Maggie Rose in replacement of Ballerini.
- During the January 26, 2019, concert in Los Angeles, "Run Run Run" was performed with John Legend in replacement of King.
- "Move You" was not performed during any of the March concerts. In addition, the medley was not performed after the March 21, 2019 concert in Cleveland.
- During the March 28-30, 2019, concerts in Duluth, Nashville, and Greenville, "Broken & Beautiful" was performed.

=== A Minute + A Glass of Wine songs ===
Clarkson performed one cover song as part of a segment referred to as "A Minute + A Glass of Wine" in a more intimate fashion.

- January 24: Oakland – "Tin Man" (Miranda Lambert cover)
- January 25: Fresno – "Idontwanttobeyouanymore" (Billie Eilish cover; performed with Lynnea Moorer).
- January 30: Salt Lake City – "Love Lies" (Khalid & Normani cover)
- February 1: Glendale – "The Weight" (The Band cover)
- February 7: Kansas City – "God is a Woman" (Ariana Grande cover)
- February 8: Tulsa – "Boys 'Round Here" (Blake Shelton cover; changed to "Girls 'Round Here")
- February 9: Southaven – "Can't Take My Eyes Off You" (Frankie Valli cover; Lauryn Hill version)
- February 14: Grand Rapids – "Jealous" (Labrinth cover)
- February 15: Green Bay – "Shallow" (Lady Gaga & Bradley Cooper cover)"
- February 16: St. Paul – "Crazy" (Willie Nelson cover; Patsy Cline version)
- February 21: Detroit – "The Joke" (Brandi Carlile cover)
- February 22: Rosemont – "In My Blood" (Shawn Mendes cover)
- February 23: St. Louis — "Valerie" (The Zutons cover; Mark Ronson & Amy Winehouse version)
- February 28: Dallas – "Dancing On My Own" (Robyn cover)
- March 2: Wichita – "Something Just Like This" (The Chainsmokers & Coldplay cover)
- March 7: Uniondale – Mashup of "Be Careful"/"Better Now"/"Ex-Factor" (Cardi B, Post Malone and Lauryn Hill covers)
- March 8: Boston – "Nobody's Cryin'" (Patty Griffin cover)
- March 9: Allentown – "Dancing with a Stranger" (Sam Smith and Normani cover)
- March 15: Uncasville – "Make It Rain" (Foy Vance cover, performed with Cartelli)
- March 16: Baltimore – "I Don't Want to Miss a Thing" (Aerosmith cover)
- March 21: Cleveland – "One" (U2 song)
- March 22: Indianapolis – "Rise Up" (Andra Day song)
- March 30: Greenville – "Time After Time" (Cyndi Lauper cover, performed with Ballerini)

=== Special guests ===
- January 24: Oakland — Allyn Pierce, a nurse who during the 2018 Camp Fire drove through the fire to rescue people.
- January 25: Fresno – Lynnea Moorer, one Clarkson's The Voice season 15 contestants.
- January 26: Los Angeles – John Legend
- January 30: Salt Lake City – The LeBaron Singers, a family music group from Utah. They performed "One Day More" from Les Misérables with her.
- February 1: Glendale – Chevel Shepherd, winner of the fifteenth season The Voice who was on Kelly's team. She performed her victory single "Broken Hearts" with Kelly.
- February 7: Kansas City – Capitol Police Officers, LaMont Jackson and Michael Pagel. Jackson and Clarkson performed "Stand by Me".
- February 14: Grand Rapids – Clarkson brought out a fan from the audience and the two sang "My Girl"
- February 15: Green Bay – Natalie Burns, a Milwaukee County Transit System bus driver. Recently, Burns allowed a homeless man to ride her route to keep him safe from the cold. After her shift she bought him food and found him shelter. Clarkson gave Burns $1,000 for her good deed.
- February 28: Dallas – Sarah Grace, who was on Kelly's team during season 15 of The Voice. She performed a mashup of "Amazing Grace" and "The House of the Rising Sun".
- March 7: Uniondale – A local choreographer who taught Kelly a dance to "Love So Soft".
- March 9: Allentown – Dylan Hartigan, who was on Kelly's team during season 14 of The Voice. He performed his song "Stop Look and Listen"
- March 14: Uncasville – Kymberli Joye, who was on Kelly's team during season 15 of The Voice . Her and Kelly sang Lauren Daigle's "You Say".
- March 16: Baltimore – Mandy Remmell and her son Blake. In December 2018, video of Mandy singing "Since U Been Gone" to her son during a Maryland Terrapins basketball game went viral. Kelly gave Blake a signed LeBron James basketball, and Mandy a $1000 gift certificate to buy a guitar.
- March 23: Cincinnati – Abby Cates who was on Kelly's team during season 15 of The Voice. She sang "Always Remember Us This Way" from A Star Is Born.
- March 28: Duluth – Kaleb Lee, who was on Kelly's team during season 14 of The Voice. He performed his songs "I Dream in Southern" and "Cooler Weather".
- March 29: Nashville – Reba McEntire. Clarkson and McEntire sang "Because of You", "Can't Even Get the Blues", "Fancy", "Is There Life Out There", and "Freedom".

== Tour dates ==
List of 2019 concerts
Date (2019)	City	Country	Venue	Opening acts	Attendance	Revenue
January 24	Oakland	United States	Oracle Arena	Kelsea Ballerini; Brynn Cartelli	10,083 / 10,083	$628,492
January 25	Fresno	United States	Save Mart Center	Kelsea Ballerini; Brynn Cartelli	8,540 / 8,540	$578,857
January 26	Los Angeles	United States	Staples Center	Kelsea Ballerini; Brynn Cartelli	13,202 / 13,202	$840,867
January 30	Salt Lake City	United States	Vivint Smart Home Arena	Kelsea Ballerini; Brynn Cartelli	10,225 / 10,225	$562,922
February 1	Glendale	United States	Gila River Arena	Kelsea Ballerini; Brynn Cartelli	10,782 / 10,782	$617,993
February 7	Kansas City	United States	Sprint Center	Kelsea Ballerini; Brynn Cartelli	8,537 / 8,537	$508,824
February 8	Tulsa	United States	BOK Center	Kelsea Ballerini; Brynn Cartelli	9,354 / 9,354	$558,005
February 9	Southaven	United States	Landers Center	Kelsea Ballerini; Brynn Cartelli	7,391 / 7,391	$469,022
February 14	Grand Rapids	United States	Van Andel Arena	Kelsea Ballerini; Brynn Cartelli	10,049 / 10,049	$598,150
February 15	Green Bay	United States	Resch Center	Kelsea Ballerini; Brynn Cartelli	7,398 / 7,398	$580,951
February 16	Saint Paul	United States	Xcel Energy Center	Kelsea Ballerini; Brynn Cartelli	13,457 / 13,457	$806,768
February 21	Detroit	United States	Little Caesars Arena	Kelsea Ballerini; Brynn Cartelli	9,451 / 9,451	$531,032
February 22,	Rosemont	United States	Allstate Arena	Kelsea Ballerini; Brynn Cartelli	11,572 / 11,572	$792,127
February 23	St. Louis	United States	Chaifetz Arena	Kelsea Ballerini; Brynn Cartelli	7,082 / 7,082	$538,504
February 28	Dallas	United States	American Airlines Center	Kelsea Ballerini; Brynn Cartelli	12,052 / 12,052	$826,935
March 2	Wichita	United States	Intrust Bank Arena	Kelsea Ballerini; Brynn Cartelli	8,589 / 8,589	$453,849
March 7	Uniondale	United States	Nassau Coliseum	Kelsea Ballerini; Brynn Cartelli	9,991 / 9,991	$744,527
March 8	Boston	United States	TD Garden	Kelsea Ballerini; Brynn Cartelli	11,687 / 11,687	$1,011,390
March 9	Allentown	United States	PPL Center	Brynn Cartelli; Maggie Rose	8,325 / 8,325	$633,717
March 14	Uncasville	United States	Mohegan Sun Arena	Brynn Cartelli; Maggie Rose	14,231 / 14,231	$743,633
March 15	Uncasville	United States	Mohegan Sun Arena	Brynn Cartelli; Maggie Rose	14,231 / 14,231	$743,633
March 16	Baltimore	United States	Royal Farms Arena	Kelsea Ballerini; Brynn Cartelli	10,605 / 10,605	$738,259
March 21	Cleveland	United States	Quicken Loans Arena	Kelsea Ballerini; Brynn Cartelli	8,256 / 8,256	$453,786
March 22	Indianapolis	United States	Bankers Life Fieldhouse	Kelsea Ballerini; Brynn Cartelli	11,060 / 11,060	$574,518
March 23	Cincinnati	United States	U.S. Bank Arena	Kelsea Ballerini; Brynn Cartelli	11,026 / 11,026	$603,348
March 28	Duluth	United States	Infinite Energy Arena	Kelsea Ballerini; Brynn Cartelli	9,275 / 9,275	$500,544
March 29	Nashville	United States	Bridgestone Arena	Kelsea Ballerini; Brynn Cartelli	13,604 / 13,604	$871,410
March 30	Greenville	United States	Bon Secours Wellness Arena	Kelsea Ballerini; Brynn Cartelli	10,825 / 10,825	$722,569
Total					276,639 / 276,639 (100%)	$17,490,910

== Personnel ==
=== Band ===
- Kelly Clarkson – Lead vocals
- Jake Botts – Saxophone
- Jaco Caraco – Guitar
- Jessi Collins – Backup vocalist
- Lester Estelle – Drums
- Aben Eubanks – Guitar
- Jason Halbert – Keyboards, piano, & musical director
- Glenn Hill – Trombone
- Allison Iraheta – Backup vocalist
- D.R. King – Backup vocalist
- Charles Ray – Trumpet
- Bridget Sarai – Backup vocalist
- Kyle Whalum – Bass

=== Miscellaneous ===
- AEG – promoter
- Leroy Bennett – production designer
- Brandon Blackstock & Starstruck Management – management
- Chris Dye – artist production manager
- Gloria Elias-Foeillet – makeup
- Clair Global – audio provider
- Candace Lambert McAndrews – costumes, styling
- Bob Lewis – monitor engineer
- Fraser McKeen – lighting director
- Chris Michaelessi – FOH engineer
- Messina Touring Group – promoter
- Robert Ramos – Hair
- Dennis Sharp – tour manager
- Jay Schmitt – production manager
- Tait Towers – Staging & Props
- Upstaging – Lighting & trucking
- Vision Visual Inc. – video
