= Meaning of Life (album) =

2017 studio album by Kelly Clarkson

Studio album by Kelly Clarkson
- Released: October 27, 2017
- Recorded: 2017
- Studio: A Studios; Capitol Studios; Echo Studio; Glenwood Place Studios; Mac and Milo's Den; Mick Schultz Studios; MilkBoy the Studio; Ocean Way Studios; The Ribcage; Historic RCA Studio A; St. Izzy's of the East; Starstruck Studios; Vox Recording
- Genre: Pop; soul; R&B
- Length: 44:08
- Label: Atlantic
- Producer: Jason Halbert; Jussifer; Greg Kurstin; Fade Majah; The Monarch; Nova Wav; Michael Pollack; Nick Ruth; Mick Schultz; Jesse Shatkin

Kelly Clarkson chronology
Piece by Piece Remixed (2016)	Meaning of Life (2017)	When Christmas Comes Around... (2021)

Singles from Meaning of Life
- 1. "Love So Soft" Released: September 7, 2017; 2. "I Don't Think About You" Released: February 9, 2018; 3. "Heat" Released: July 27, 2018

Meaning of Life is the eighth studio album by American pop singer Kelly Clarkson. It was released on October 27, 2017, by Atlantic Records. Executive produced by Clarkson and Craig Kallman, the album is her debut release for the label after completing her recording contract and leaving previous label, RCA Records, which she had signed after winning the first season of American Idol. Weary of the structure of the previous record deal where she was strictly limited to releasing pop music, Clarkson wanted to pursue a different genre—soul and R&B music, which she had previously wanted to make and had only finally found the opportunity to do so after being signed by Kallman to the label.

Meaning of Life is Clarkson's second foray into soul and R&B music, after the lead single to her debut album "Miss Independent", departing from the predominant pop and pop rock sound established from her previous studio releases and returning to her multi-genre performances on American Idol. Inspired by the music of the 1990s and prominent singers Aretha Franklin, Mariah Carey, Whitney Houston, En Vogue and Bonnie Raitt, Clarkson wanted the album to evoke a music similar to the early works of those artists—with the overall goal of emoting a "soulful" spirit. To achieve this, Clarkson commissioned several collaborators—from previous associates Jesse Shatkin, Greg Kurstin, Mozella and Jason Halbert, to new project partners The Monarch, Mick Schultz, Harlœ and James Morrison. The album's tracks share a cohesive theme of interpersonal connections in life, centered on the subjects of love and living the moment.

Meaning of Life received a generally positive response from music critics, who commended Clarkson's newfound confidence and the cohesiveness of the album. Commercially, the record became her eighth consecutive studio album to debut in the top three of the Billboard 200 chart. Three singles were released to promote the album: "Love So Soft", "I Don't Think About You", and "Heat", the first and last of which topped the Billboard Dance Club Songs chart. Meaning of Life received two Grammy Award nominations for Best Pop Vocal Album and Best Pop Solo Performance for "Love So Soft" at the 60th and 61st ceremony. Its supporting concert tour of the same name visited various arenas throughout the United States between January and March 2019.

== Background ==
After releasing her seventh studio album, Piece by Piece (2015), along with its companion remix album in 2016, Kelly Clarkson had completed the terms of her recording contract with RCA Records and 19 Recordings which she had signed as a prize after winning the inaugural season of American Idol in 2002. As opposed to the previous contract structure where 19 held the phonographic rights to the master recordings, (Note: On the recording contract Clarkson signed in 2002, 19 Recordings reserves the phonographic rights to the master recordings of Clarkson's winning contract. While Simon Cowell's S Records (a unit of BMG trading as Ronagold Limited) secured the rights to appoint another record label within the BMG family to receive an exclusive license for the masters. For Clarkson's case, S (Ronagold) designated RCA Records as the licensee and the latter subsequently became her primary label for the duration of the deal.) RCA executives Peter Edge and Tom Corson revealed their intentions to sign Clarkson directly to the label without 19's involvement. Their renewal offer would include a three-album deal with a US$1 million advance per album, in contrast to the six-album limit (Note: Clarkson's Christmas album Wrapped in Red (2013) is not included in the 19 and RCA agreement pursuant to the six-studio album limit, as RCA retains sole phonographic rights to the album's masters and only considers it as a holiday album.) from the previous contract with a US$500,000 incentive per record. Corson also admitted that her relationship with Sony Music executive Clive Davis might prove to be a nuance to the offer.

Despite remarking that her relationship with Edge and Corson on the label had proved to be successful, Clarkson had second thoughts about renewing the contract, which she recalled as an "arranged marriage". As a result, her management met with Warner Music Nashville executive John Esposito, who brokered a meeting with Atlantic Records executives Craig Kallman and Julie Greenwald, who in turn offered her a long-term worldwide deal with a larger creative freedom. On June 24, 2016, Warner Music Group announced that Clarkson had signed a long-term worldwide recording contract with Atlantic and would immediately work on a soul and R&B album set to be released the following year. The move to Atlantic also reunited her with Pete Ganbarg, who had previously did A&R work for her fourth studio album All I Ever Wanted (2009). Later that year, Kallman and Ganbarg, who was producing A&R work on a mixtape inspired by the Broadway musical Hamilton, invited Clarkson to record the musical number "It's Quiet Uptown" for the mixtape, making it her debut appearance on an Atlantic record.

== Recording and production ==
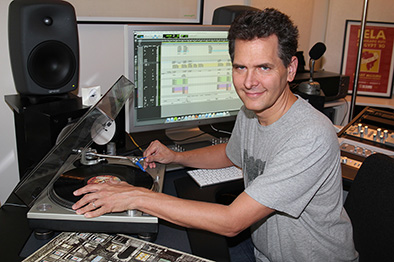
Craig Kallman, Chairman and CEO of Atlantic Records, personally handled the A&R work on the album and also served as its executive producer, making him the first CEO to executive produce a Kelly Clarkson album since Clive Davis. (Note: Clive Davis, then CEO of RCA Music Group, is the executive producer of Clarkson's first two studio albums Thankful (2003) and Breakaway (2004).)

Three of Clarkson's producers from Piece by Piece were confirmed to return for Meaning of Life: Greg Kurstin, Jason Halbert, and Jesse Shatkin, whereas first-time collaborators include The Monarch, Nick Ruth, and Mick Schultz. Deviating from the predominant pop rock sound of her previous releases, Clarkson wanted to approach a different genre—soul and R&B music. She revealed that she had previously wanted to record this type of songs but had never found an opportunity to do so, but has found out that Kallman was "dying to make this record" with her and has counted on his full support. She said the new material was reminiscent of the songs she had performed during her tenure on American Idol, and remarked that the album was a "new and fresh thing" for her and made her feel like a "brand new artist again". Recording sessions began after Clarkson's pregnancy in 2016 and continued until 2017.

To avoid making material similar to that of Stronger (2011), Clarkson met with various songwriters and showcased several soulful tracks to them to demonstrate the album's direction. She remarked that her meeting with various writing camps, discussing what kind of songs she wanted from them and rejecting songs that did not fit the direction of the album was a "different process" for her. Clarkson said that she "wrote a bit", finding inspiration for a song's lyrics in the novel Big Little Lies, but her family life had hindered opportunities for her to contribute more to the writing. Several songwriters such as Ali Tamposi, Mozella, Harlœ, Sebastian Kole, Diztortion, Warren "Oak" Felder have all confirmed to have submitted material to Clarkson in Nashville.

Clarkson and Kallman ultimately executive produced the entire album, with the latter handling the A&R himself. It marked the first time in ten years Clarkson was credited as an executive producer. (Note: Clarkson was credited as an executive producer for her third album My December (2007).) She described him as "instrumental" in steering the record, but also allowed her to explore the soulful side of her voice that she once displayed on American Idol and in live concerts. She remarked that he helped her understand what an executive producer credit on an album really meant, saying that he would often push the producers who are used to working with other executives in making radio-friendly hits, but that it sometimes tears the spirit and soul out of it. Both invited several performers to play on the album—Kallman personally invited the soul band Earth, Wind & Fire to perform at the recording sessions for the album's two tracks, while Clarkson requested her touring backup singers—Jessi Collins, Nicole Hurst, and Bridget Sarai, to be given a more prominent feature by accompanying her lead vocals, deviating from the usual practice of recording her own background vocals in her previous albums.

== Composition ==
=== Theme and influences ===
The logo of Meaning of Life — Clarkson wanted the album's logo to be illustrated as a circle to emphasize on life's connection and avoided anything to be displayed at its center to indicate no one in life is being directly favored.

"I think life is about loving yourself enough so that you can love others. We need to connect, we need to have conversations. Like, why not ask someone 'Hey, I didn't grow up like you did, let's talk about it!' Sharing those moments is what makes us human. If you're always limiting yourself to your own front porch, you'll never truly get to see the rest of the world around you."

— Clarkson on connection being the central theme of the album.

Meaning of Life has a cohesive theme—connection. Lyrical contents of each of the album's tracks center on "love and living, rooted in the past and living in the moment". When asked about what is the "meaning of life" to her, Clarkson remarked that "life is about connection." Clarkson also illustrated the album's logo as a circle to emphasize on life's connection and to indicate that no one is in the middle of it. She added, "This album is not great because of Kelly Clarkson," Kelly admits. "It's great because of all the musicians, all of the singers that are highlighted, all of the engineers, the producers. There are a lot of people that make up an album, and we really wanted to highlight those people." Musically, Clarkson was mainly inspired by the music of the 1990s, along with the early works of vocalists Aretha Franklin, Mariah Carey, Whitney Houston, En Vogue and Bonnie Raitt, whose soulful catalogs have inspired a young Clarkson to sing in high school and later embark on a music career. Franklin became the starting point for inspiration, with Clarkson asking, "What if Aretha was born now and made a record today?" as a guiding principle. In turn, Kallman made sure that the record would not sound old, saying that "it's just not nostalgic and a retro experience" but described it as a "modern experience infused with the best of those records we call standards". Critics described Meaning of Life as a mixture of soulful R&B pop; While some designated it as a "soulful pop"/"pop-soul" album, others illustrated it as a soul and R&B record. Raissa Bruner of Time saw its tracks as "soulful anthems mixed with rollicking empowerment pop", while Josh Bell of the Washington Blade characterized it as "more soulful and R&B-influenced than Clarkson's prior work, although it's still very much a pop album."

Meaning of Life is promulgated by Atlantic as the album she was destined to make with the label, a "sensual" pop record and her first documented soul and R&B album; while Clarkson personally described it as the album she had wanted to make since junior high but also a "grown-ass woman's record", explaining that the lyrical content found on the album may not be suitable for her younger self to make. She remarked, "This is a record you make when you've lived (sic)." Unlike her previous releases where she had co-written much of the material, she felt compelled to only pen a few, saying that taking an active role in writing the songs would have taken an expense on her family life. Clarkson then commissioned material that showcases her current state of mind—such as dealing with the rewards and complications that come with connecting with someone emotionally, mentally, physically in a marriage; as well as a mature woman feeling completely comfortable in her own skin after years of withering sexist criticism about her appearance. To discuss these concepts, she invited several collaborators, including Harlœ, whose conversations with Clarkson were used to create some of the album's lyrical content.

=== Song analysis ===
"Meaning of Life"
Co-penned by English singer James Morrison for the Piece by Piece album, the titular track 'Meaning of Life" served as a guiding point for other collaborators in creating the soulful sound of the album.

The album opens with "A Minute (Intro)" as the introductory track. Written and produced by The Monarch with writing input from Jim McCormick and Katie Pearlman, the song is a minute-long anthem for self-care, and was primarily made for Clarkson, whose hectic family and work life have made it hard for her to take a break for a minute for herself. Shatkin, Mozella and Priscilla Renea co-wrote and co-produced the second track "Love So Soft", which is dubbed as a tribute to classic R&B while still sounding contemporary. The Monarch and Mick Schultz produced the third song "Heat", and co-wrote it with Harlœ and Michael Pollack. Clarkson described the song as discussing on giving 100% commitment to one another and as reminiscent of her relationship with her husband. The fourth song and the titular track, "Meaning of Life", was written by British singer James Morrison with Ilsey Juber and Shatkin, who handled its production. Morrison and Shatkin originally presented the song to Clarkson for Piece by Piece, but she felt its theme was unsuitable for the album at the time. She later took a hold on the song and used it as a base point for the other producers in making material for the follow-up album. The fifth, "Move You", was written by Nick Ruth, Amy Kuney, and Molly Kate Kestner. Produced by Ruth, Kuney built the song's framework to bridge the gap between religious and secular music. Clarkson co-wrote the sixth track "Whole Lotta Woman" with Jussifer, Novawav duo Denisia Andrews & Brittany Coney, Fade Majah, and Shatkin. Produced by the latter four, the song is an empowerment anthem for women using metaphors from American Southern culture, primarily with Texan women, whom Clarkson is considered one of. Select members of Earth, Wind & Fire, led by Verdine White, prominently played throughout the number.

Schultz and Harlœ co-wrote and produced the seventh track "Medicine" as a tribute to the '90s with inspiration from Carey's song "Emotions" (1991). The follow-up track "Cruel" was written by The Monarch, Harlœ and Pat Linehan, and was produced by Jason Halbert, which sings of commanding respect from a partner. The Monarch and Shatkin produced the ninth song "Didn't I", which was written by the Davidsons, Audra Mae, and Pearlman. In the song, she bellows at a man for forsaking her after committing herself to him. Based on her experience in witnessing failed relationships of some of her loved ones and asking about a retrospective about it, Clarkson co-wrote the succeeding track "Would You Call that Love" with Greg Kurstin, who produced it. The eleventh song "I Don't Think About You" was written by Harlœ, Michael Pollack, and The Monarch, who handled its production. Requested by Clarkson to write a ballad that showcases her vocals, Harlœ based the song from her past relationship. Ruth, Kuney, and Kestner wrote the twelfth track "Slow Dance", a sultry number which is about a woman demanding a man to take things slowly, instead of falling victim to his advances. Clarkson, Shatkin, and Mozella co-wrote both the album's final two tracks—the penultimate, "Don't You Pretend", is about demanding a man to be honest about his true feelings; and the concluding number "Go High", an anthem which was inspired by former U.S. First Lady Michelle Obama's speech at the 2016 Democratic National Convention.

== Release and promotion ==
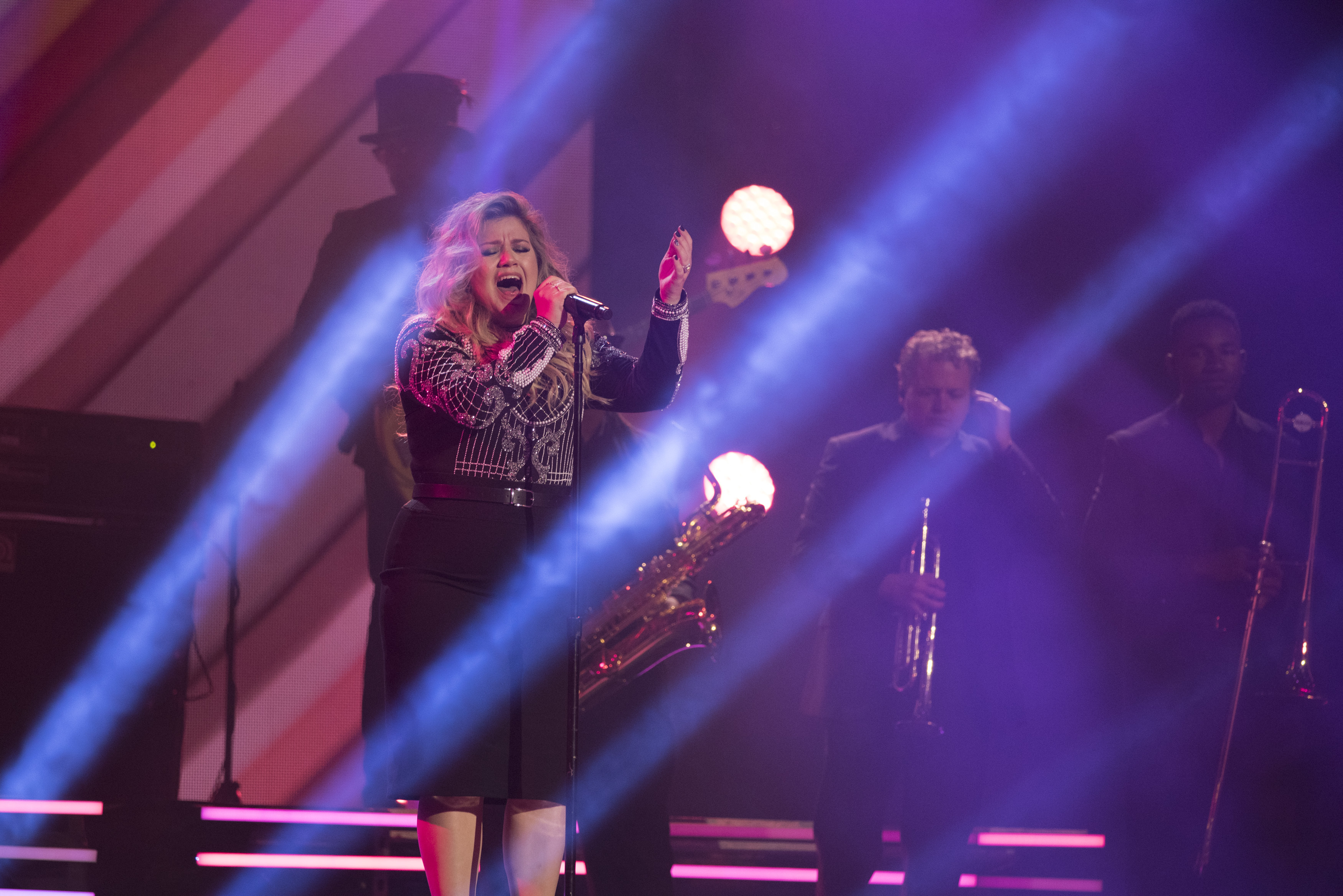
Clarkson performing at the 2017 Invictus Games in Toronto

Meaning of Life was released by Atlantic and its parent label Warner Music Group on October 27, 2017. Originally scheduled to be released in June 2017, the release date was pushed back to the year's fall season. Chris Ruff, Atlantic's senior marketing manager, remarked that the album's roll-out strategy would first be driven towards selling physical copies, which would be followed by a promotional campaign with streaming platforms in the following year. The album's lead single "Love So Soft" was released digitally alongside "Move You" on September 7, 2017. "Love So Soft" peaked within the top fifty of the Billboard Hot 100 chart and topped the Billboard Dance Club Songs ranking. A week before the album's release, its titular song "Meaning of Life" was issued as a promotional single on October 19, 2017. "I Don't Think About You" was released as the follow-up single on February 9, 2018, followed by "Heat" as the third single on July 27, 2018. Clarkson announced plans to do a worldwide tour to support the album following the conclusion of the fourteenth season of The Voice, where she was then currently participating as a coach. On September 14, 2018, she announced the Meaning of Life Tour, which visited selected U.S. cities from January to March 2019.

To promote the album, Clarkson embarked on several intimate concerts in North America. On September 6, 2017, Kallman, Greenwald and Warner Music CEO of Recorded Music Max Lousada jointly presented Clarkson's performance of the album's six selections at the Rainbow Room in New York City. She also filmed a "Nashville Sessions" series at the War Memorial Auditorium in Nashville, with selected performances being eventually released online. On September 28, 2017, she taped an iHeartRadio Secret Session in Toronto, which was broadcast as a radio special the following month. On its release date, Clarkson performed several songs from the album at an album release party hosted by iHeartRadio in Los Angeles. The event was also aired live in simulcast on various iHeartRadio radio stations. In November 2017, she performed on two album release events in New York City—one was hosted by astrophysicist Neil DeGrasse Tyson at YouTube Space and the other at the Gramercy Theatre hosted and tape-broadcast by SiriusXM. American chain store Cracker Barrel also sponsored a "Rocking and Stockings" content series to promote the album during the 2017 holiday season, featuring selected performances by Clarkson.

Clarkson performed numerous selections from Meaning of Life in various televised events. She premiered "Love So Soft" on The Today Show a day after its release date and has performed it on programs such as America's Got Talent, The Ellen DeGeneres Show, The Graham Norton Show, The Late Late Show with James Corden, The Voice of Germany, the 2017 We Day, the 2017 Invictus Games, and the 2017 American Music Awards. She also performed the titular track on Strictly Come Dancing; "I Don't Think About You" on The Ellen DeGeneres Show; "Move You", "I Don't Think About You", and "Didn't I" on The Today Show; "Heat" on The Today Show and the Opening Ceremony of the 2018 US Open; "Whole Lotta Woman" on The Tonight Show Starring Jimmy Fallon, The Late Late Show with James Corden (during Carpool Karaoke), and the 2018 Billboard Music Awards; "I Don't Think About You" and "Didn't I" on Late Night with Seth Meyers; and, "Medicine" and "I Don't Think About You" on The Voice.

== Critical reception ==
Professional ratings
Aggregate scores
Source	Rating
AnyDecentMusic?	6.7/10
Metacritic	73/100
Review scores
Source	Rating
AllMusic	4/5 stars
Daily Express	5/5 stars
Entertainment Weekly	B+
The Guardian	3/5 stars
Idolator	4.5/5 stars
Newsday	4/5 stars
The Observer	4/5 stars
Renowned for Sound	3.5/5 stars
Slant Magazine	3.5/5 stars
The Times	4/5 stars

Meaning of Life received a generally positive response from music critics. Consensus from reviews compiled by Gold Derby reveal that the "intimate, R&B-drenched album is full of confidence," describing its emphasis on soul as "euphorically liberated". On the review aggregator site Metacritic, which assigns a normalized rating out of 100 to reviews from mainstream critics, the album received an average score of 73, based on eight reviews, indicating "generally favorable reviews". AllMusic's senior editor Stephen Thomas Erlewine gave the album a four-star rating, calling it one of her most satisfying albums and commending Clarkson for sounding "assured here in a way that differs from her earliest records". Leah Greenblatt of Entertainment Weekly gave it a "B+" rating. Deeming the album as feeling cohesive and self-assured, she considered that it doesn't seem especially interested in reaching the heights of Clarkson's early hit records but "swings low and sweet — a refreshingly real dispatch from an artist expressing exactly what she feels in this moment." Writing for Time, Bruner wrote that the album "finds her as fans prefer: a confident artist with a sense of humor and sass to spare." Shaun Kitchener of the Daily Express rated the album five stars, writing that Clarkson was "in her absolute element" on it, and the album was a "peppier, more playful alternative to Adele's 25".

Glenn Gamboa of Newsday gave Meaning of Life a four-star rating. Praising it as the best album of Clarkson's career, he wrote that it presented a "chance to declare her ambitions and deliver on them" for her "most cohesive album yet". The Boston Globe correspondent Isaac Feldberg commented that Clarkson "has perhaps never sounded as confident or comfortable as she does" on the album, and that she "channels her delight at [her] newfound freedom into songs that, while signaling a new stage in her career, appear to flow directly from both her heart and soul." Mike Nied of Idolator shared a similar sentiment, saying that "returning to her roots had truly opened a wealth of opportunities" for Clarkson. Craig Jenkins of Vulture described the album as "a simmering pot of warm grooves and powerful vocals, a career pivot to the music that Clarkson ought to have been allowed to make right out of the gate." Reviewing for The Observer, Michael Cragg rated the album four stars, comparing its sound to Meghan Trainor and Mariah Carey and crediting its "big, syrupy" ballads for "accentuating Clarkson's undeniably powerful voice, creating a comfort zone that feels genuine."

Some of the critics were also ambivalent on the album: The Guardian's Hannah Davis gave the record a three-star rating, writing that the album had "lots of filler" and notably evoked the records of Christina Aguilera and Trainor, but its "strong, '90s diva-ish mood suits Clarkson's belting vocal style, as she ushers in a more soulful phase with class." Reviewing the album for Spin, Katherine St. Asaph noted that much of it feels "dated, studiously attempting to recreate an era Clarkson's long since transcended", and despite praising her vocal showcase, she was puzzled that after "to hear an album that sounds so much like contractual winner's filler" almost 15 years after winning the competition.

=== Accolades and honors ===
Meaning of Life has received nominations for Best Pop Vocal Album at the 61st Grammy Awards and Best Pop Solo Performance for "Love So Soft" at the 60th ceremony. Both nominations earned Clarkson the distinction of being the most-nominated artist in both categories' history, sharing the Best Pop Vocal Album record with Justin Timberlake. In the midst of promoting the album, Clarkson was also honored at various award-giving programs, including the Powerhouse Award at the 2017 Billboard Women in Music event, Icon Award at the 2018 Radio Disney Music Awards, and a Hall of Fame induction at the 2017 Nickelodeon HALO Awards.

=== Year-end lists ===
Meaning of Life was included on several publications' year-end lists:

- AllMusic, Favorite Pop Albums of 2017
- AXS, 10 Best Pop Albums of 2017
- BBC, Best Albums of 2017
- Billboard, 50 Best Albums of 2017: Critics' Picks
- Entertainment Weekly, 25 Best Albums of 2017
- Idolator, Best Pop Albums & EPs of 2017
- Newsday, Best Albums of 2017
- Rolling Stone, 20 Best Pop Albums of 2017
- Time, Best Albums of 2017 (commendation)
- Us Weekly, Best Albums of 2017

== Commercial performance ==
Meaning of Life debuted on the Billboard 200 chart in the United States at number two with 79,000 album-equivalent units, which account 68,000 copies in traditional album sales. The album's chart debut on the Billboard 200 earned Clarkson her eighth consecutive top three studio album as well her third record to debut at the second spot. Meaning of Life also debuted at the top of the Billboard Digital Albums chart and became her first entry on the Billboard Vinyl Albums chart. Overseas, the album entered the top ten of the Billboard Canadian Albums chart and the Australian ARIA Albums Chart. It also attained a top twenty debut on the Official UK Albums Chart, the Irish IRMA Artist Albums Chart, and the Swiss Hitparade chart; and a top forty entry on the national charts of Austria, Germany, and the Netherlands. The album received a RIAA Gold certification in 2021, selling 500,000 equivalent units in the US.

== Track listing ==
Standard edition
No.	Title	Writer(s)	Producer(s)	Length
1.	"A Minute (Intro)"	Andre Davidson; Sean Davidson; Jim McCormick; Katie Pearlman	The Monarch	1:08
2.	"Love So Soft"	Jesse Shatkin; Priscilla Renea; Maureen "Mozella" McDonald	Shatkin; Mozella^{[a]}; Renea^{[a]}	2:52
3.	"Heat"	A. Davidson; S. Davidson; Jessica Ashley Karpov; Michael Pollack; Mick Schultz	The Monarch; Schultz; Shatkin ^{[a]}; Karpov^{[a]}	3:10
4.	"Meaning of Life"	Shatkin; Ilsey Juber; James Morrison Catchpole	Shatkin	3:51
5.	"Move You"	Nick Ruth; Amy Kuney; Molly Kate Kestner	Ruth	3:22
6.	"Whole Lotta Woman"	Kelly Clarkson; Jussi Karvinen; Denisia "Blu June" Andrews; Brittany "Chi" Coney; Evon Barnes Jr.; Shatkin	Shatkin; Jussifer; Nova Wav; Fade Majah	2:53
7.	"Medicine"	Schultz; Karpov	Schultz; Karpov^{[a]}	3:09
8.	"Cruel"	A. Davidson; S. Davidson; Karpov; Pat Linehan	Jason Halbert	3:05
9.	"Didn't I"	A. Davidson; S. Davidson; Audra Mae; Pearlman	The Monarch; Shatkin	3:38
10.	"Would You Call That Love"	Clarkson; Greg Kurstin	Kurstin	2:58
11.	"I Don't Think About You"	A. Davidson; S. Davidson; Pollack; Karpov	The Monarch; Pollack^{[b]}	3:44
12.	"Slow Dance"	Ruth; Kuney; Kestner	Ruth	3:40
13.	"Don't You Pretend"	Clarkson; Shatkin; McDonald	Shatkin	3:13
14.	"Go High"	Clarkson; Shatkin; McDonald	Shatkin	3:25
Total length:				44:08

Japanese edition
No.	Title	Remix producer	Length
15.	"Love So Soft" (Cash Cash remix)	Cash Cash	4:16
16.	"Love So Soft" (Ryan Riback remix)	Ryan Riback	3:07
Total length:			51:31

=== Notes ===
- ^{^[a]} signifies a vocal producer.
- ^{^[b]} signifies an additional producer.

== Personnel ==
Credits were adapted from the album's liner notes.

Vocals

- Kelly Clarkson – lead vocals
- Jessi Collins – background vocals (tracks 4–5, 8, 10, 12–13)
- Nicole Hurst – background vocals (tracks 2–13)
- Jessica Karpov (Harlœ) – background vocals (tracks 3, 7)
- Maureen McDonald (Mozella) – background vocals (tracks 2, 13)
- Priscilla Renea – background vocals (track 2)
- Bridget Sarai – background vocals (tracks 2–13)

Musicians

- David Barnett – viola (tracks 4–5, 13–14)
- Joe Cleveland – keyboards (track 1)
- Gared Crawford – violin (tracks 4–5, 13–14)
- Andre & Sean Davidson (The Monarch) – producer, vocal producer (tracks 1, 3, 8–9, 11)
- Srdjan Dimitrijevic – guitar (track 6)
- Earth, Wind & Fire Horn Section – horns: (tracks 2, 6)
  - Gary Bias – tenor saxophone
  - Bobby Burns – trumpet
  - Raymond Lee Brown – horn orchestrator, leader, music prep
  - Chuck Findley – trumpet
  - Reggie Young – trombone
- Lester Estelle – drums (track 8)
- Aben Eubanks – guitar (track 8)
- Peter Filochowski – violin (tracks 4–5, 13–14)
- Glenn Fischbach – cello (tracks 4–5, 13–14)
- Henry Flory – violin (tracks 4–5, 13–14)
- Andreas Geck – bass (track 8)
- Jeff "Gitty" Gitelman – guitar solo (track 12)
- Jason Halbert – Hammond organ (track 8), keyboards (track 8), piano (track 12), piano (tracks 8, 12)
- Mark Hill – bass (track 5)
- Sean Kantrowitz – guitar (tracks 2, 14)
- Jonathan Kim – viola (tracks 4–5, 13–14)
- Emma Kummrow – violin (tracks 2, 14)
- Greg Kurstin – drums, baritone guitar, bass synth, guitar, keyboards, mbira, piano (track 10)
- Trevor Laurence Jr. – drums (tracks 1, 12)
- Jennie Lorenzo – cello (tracks 4–5, 13–14)
- Luigi Mazzocchi – violin (tracks 4–5, 13–14)
- Christopher McHugh – drums (track 5)
- Gabriel Noel – bass (track 2)
- Morris O'Connor – guitar (track 6)
- Orchestra members – strings (track 8):
  - Jenny Bifano, Maria Conti, Janet Darnell, Conni Ellisor, Aliva Enstrom, Amy Helman, Anthony LaMarchina, Jung-Min Shin, Alan Umstead, Catherine Umstead, Mary Katherine VanOsdale, Bruce Wethey, Karen Winkelmann
- John Paris – drums (track 6)
- Charles Parker – violin (tracks 4–5, 13–14)
- Eric Peterson – guitar (tracks 3, 7)
- The Regiment Horns – horns, (tracks 2, 4–6, 9, 13), brass arrangement (track 5):
  - Sean Erick – flugelhorn, trumpet
  - Leon Silva – tenor saxophone, baritone saxophone
  - Kevin Williams Jr. – trombone, tuba
- Buddy Ross – organ (tracks 2, 4, 13), piano (tracks 4, 13)
- Nick Ruth – guitar, organ (tracks 5, 12)
- Brian Schultz – bass (tracks 3, 7)
- Jesse Shatkin – bass, concert bells, drums, drum programming, guitar, organ, piano, synthesizers (tracks 2–4, 6, 9, 13–14)
- Philip Townes – organ (track 12)
- Verdine White – bass (tracks 2, 6)

Production

- Denisia "Blu June" Andrews (Novawav) – producer (track 6)
- Paul Bailey – engineer (tracks 5, 12)
- Evon Barnes Jr. (Fade Majah) – producer (track 6)
- Brandon Blackstock – manager
- Paul Buckmaster – string arrangement (track 11)
- Julian Burg – engineer (track 10)
- BTW Productions – music preparation (track 8)
- Chris Cerullo – assistant engineer (tracks 2, 4–6, 9, 13)
- Jeff Chestek – engineer (tracks 4–5, 13–14)
- Kelly Clarkson - executive producer (all tracks)
- Brittany "Chi" Coney (Novawav) – producer (track 6)
- Andre & Sean Davidson (The Monarch) – bass, drum programming, additional programming, keyboards, producer, vocal producer (tracks 1, 3, 8–9, 11)
- John DeNosky – additional vocal engineer (track 8)
- Samuel Dent – additional engineering (tracks 2, 4–6, 9, 13)
- Joshua Ditty – assistant engineer (track 13)
- Ashley Donovan – makeup
- Iain Findlay – assistant engineer (track 2, 13), engineer (track 3)
- Chris Gehringer – mastering
- Serban Ghenea – mixer
- Greg Gigen's Dad Burke (Gregory Burke) – art direction
- Larry Gold – conductor, string arrangement (tracks 4–5, 13–14)
- Jason Halbert – engineer, producer, programming (track 8)
- John Hanes – mixing engineer
- Michael Harris – engineer (tracks 4–6, 9, 13)
- Bob Horn – vocal producer (tracks 1, 12)
- Gena Johnson – assistant engineer (track 12)
- Jussi Karvinen (Jussifer) – producer (track 6)
- Craig Kallman – A&R, executive producer
- Jessica Karpov (Harlœ) – vocal producer (tracks 3, 7)
- Greg Kurstin – engineer, producer (track 10)
- Candice Lambert – styling
- Justin Levy – background vocal arrangement (track 8)
- Maureen McDonald (Mozella) – vocal producer (track 2)
- Joel Metzler – assistant engineer (tracks 4–5, 13–14)
- Alex Pasco – engineer (track 10)
- Vincent Peters – photography
- Will Quinnell – mastering
- Priscilla Renea – vocal producer (track 2)
- Robert Ramos – hair
- The Regiment Horns – brass arrangement (track 5):
- Shiela Richman – publicity
- Craig Rosen – A&R administrator
- Nick Ruth – programming, producer (tracks 5, 12)
- Mick Schultz – engineer, producer (tracks 3, 7)
- Jesse Shatkin – synthesizers, additional programming, engineer, producer, vocal producer (tracks 2–4, 6, 9, 13–14)
- Jordan Silva – engineer (track 1), assistant engineer (track 12)
- Eddie Spear – engineer (track 12)
- Nick Spezia – engineer (track 8)
- Robert "RAab" Stevenson – background vocal arrangement (track 8)
- Todd Tidwell – assistant engineer, engineer (tracks 2–6, 9, 13)
- Joann Tominaga – production coordinator (tracks 2, 4–6, 9, 13)
- Carolyn Tracey – project manager
- Joseph Trapanese – orchestrator, strings conductor (track 8)
- Alan Umstead – orchestra contractor (track 8)
- Nina Webb – marketing
- Carrie West – A&R coordinator
- Booker White – music preparation (track 8)
- Shane D. Wilson – engineer (track 8)

Recorded, engineered, mixed and mastered at

- Burbank, California (Glenwood Place Studios)
- Hollywood, California (Capitol Studios)
- Los Angeles, California (A Studios, Echo Studio, The Ribcage, Vox Recording)
- Nashville, Tennessee (Historic RCA Studio A, Ocean Way Studios, Starstruck Studios, St. Izzy's of the East)
- New York City, New York (Sterling Sound)
- Philadelphia, Pennsylvania (MilkBoy the Studio)
- Tarzana, California (Mick Schultz Studios)
- Venice Beach, California (Mac and Milo's Den)
- Virginia Beach, Virginia (MixStar Studios)

== Charts ==
=== Weekly charts ===
Chart (2017–2018)	Peak position
Australian Albums (ARIA)	6
Austrian Albums (Ö3 Austria)	27
Belgian Albums (Ultratop Flanders)	42
Belgian Albums (Ultratop Wallonia)	115
Canadian Albums (Billboard)	4
Dutch Albums (Album Top 100)	35
French Albums (SNEP)	138
German Albums (Offizielle Top 100)	32
Irish Albums (IRMA)	18
Japanese Albums (Oricon)	23
New Zealand Albums (RMNZ)	21
Scottish Albums (Official Charts)	10
South Korean Albums (Circle)	67
Spanish Albums (Promusicae)	47
Swiss Albums (Schweizer Hitparade)	19
UK Albums (Official Charts)	11
UK Album Downloads (Official Charts)	8
US Billboard 200	2
US Indie Store Album Sales (Billboard)	16

=== Year-end charts ===
Chart (2018)	Position
US Top Album Sales (Billboard)	89
US Top Current Albums (Billboard)	79

== Certifications ==
Region	Certification	Certified units/sales
United States (RIAA)	Gold	500,000^{‡}
^{‡} Sales+streaming figures based on certification alone.

== Release history ==
Release formats for Meaning of Life
Region	Date	Formats	Label	Catalog number	Ref.
Various	October 27, 2017	CD; digital download; LP; streaming	Atlantic	563941-2	
Japan	October 27, 2017	CD; digital download; LP; streaming	Atlantic	WPCR-17920	
Various	May 4, 2018	Limited edition LP	Atlantic	567235-2	
