= Roll the Dice =

Roll the Dice may refer to:

- Roll the Dice (band), a Swedish analogue electronic music duo
- Roll the Dice, an album by Damone (band)
- "Roll the Dice" (Steve Harley song)
- "Roll the Dice", a song by Dusty Trails from the album Dusty Trails
- "Roll the Dice", a song by Shawty Lo
- "Roll the Dice", a song by Shy FX
- "Roll the Dice", a song by Status Quo from the album Under the Influence
- Roll the Dice, the autobiography of Darius Guppy
- Roll the Dice (The Cuphead Show!), an episode from the Netflix cartoon, The Cuphead Show!
