= I Don't Think About You =

Single by Kelly Clarkson

from the album Meaning of Life
- Released: February 9, 2018
- Recorded: 2017
- Studio: Starstruck Studios (Nashville, TN); Capitol Studios (Los Angeles, CA)
- Genre: Pop; soul
- Length: 3:44
- Label: Atlantic
- Songwriters: Andre Davidson; Sean Davidson; Jessica Ashley Karpov; Michael Pollack
- Producers: The Monarch; Michael Pollack (add.)

Kelly Clarkson singles chronology
"Christmas Eve" (2017)	"I Don't Think About You" (2018)	"Heat" (2018)

Music video
- "I Don't Think About You" on YouTube

"I Don't Think About You" is a song by American singer Kelly Clarkson, from her eighth studio album, Meaning of Life (2017). It was written and produced by the production duo The Monarch, with co-writing by American singer Harlœ and pianist Michael Pollack. The song was issued by Atlantic Records as the album's second single on February 9, 2018.

== Composition ==
"I Don't Think About You" is written by Sean & Andre Davidson of the production duo The Monarch, singer Jessica Ashley (professionally known as Harlœ), and Vanderbilt pianist Michael Pollack. Lyrically, the song is about emerging from a failed relationship, and was primarily based on Harlœ's past. Harlœ, who travelled to Nashville, Tennessee in 2016 to collaborate with Clarkson, told her that the song was inspired by a situation in her life where she was old enough to finally realize and conclude that the relationship 'didn't work out, and you're kind of a douche, but thank you for making me a stronger human. Let's just move on. I wish you well, but I wish you not near me.'" Prior to finishing the track, Clarkson had asked Harlœ to pen it like a Whitney-esque ballad to showcase her range, which led to an arrangement emphasizing on her vocals. Music critics also observed that the song's content may also haven alluded to Clarkson's relationship to her former label, RCA Records as wells as her detractors.

"I Don't Think About You" features a piano-backed melody performed by Pollack. It also features string arrangements conducted by Paul Buckmaster, and is one of his final studio recordings prior to his death. The song is written in the key of A♭ major with a moderately slow tempo, Clarkson's voice spans two octaves from C_{4} to C_{6}.

== Critical reception ==
Glenn Gamboa of Newsday complimentary compared the song to Mariah Carey's debut material and that she showcases her multi-octave range and walks the line between vulnerability and defiance in a way that is as timeless as Carey's debut. Idolator's Mike Nied wrote that the ballad lets her voice soar through some intricate gymnastics on what could be one of her most challenging arrangements, and remarked that "Unsurprisingly, she misses no steps and delivers something truly commendable for both the vocal excellence and personal growth she displays." Ariana Davis of Refinery29 noted that the glass-shattering soprano notes and passion behind each lyric of the song seem to be sending the listener a very clear message: that she is, indeed, proud of the woman she has become.

== Live performances ==
To promote "I Don't Think About You", Clarkson has performed the song live on several television shows. On February 26, 2018, Clarkson performed the song live on Today. On February 28, she performed the song on Late Night with Seth Meyers. She performed it on The Ellen DeGeneres Show on April 26, and on the fourteenth season of The Voice on May 7, 2018.

== Music video ==
The accompanying music video premiered on Clarkson's official YouTube on March 20, 2018.

In the video, Clarkson is singing on a platform and there are scenes interspersed of younger versions of Clarkson, as Billboard's Abby Jones describes as, "including a rocky family situation during her childhood, a troubling boyfriend in her teen years and battling management as she entered the early stages of her career."

== Track listing ==
Digital streaming

No.	Title	Length
1.	"I Don't Think About You"	3:44

Digital streaming – Remixes EP

No.	Title	Length
1.	"I Don't Think About You" (Luca Schreiner Remix)	3:44
2.	"I Don't Think About You" (Tep No Remix)	3:16
3.	"I Don't Think About You" (Gil Glaze x Lanna Remix)	3:48
4.	"I Don't Think About You" (DJ Lazslo Remix)	3:59

== Personnel ==
Credits from Tidal.

- Lead vocals – Kelly Clarkson
- Background vocals – Nicole Hurst, Bridget Sarai
- Songwriters – Andre Davidson, Sean Davidson, Jessica Ashley Karpov, Michael Pollack
- Producers – The Monarch,
- Additional producer – Michael Pollack
- Mixing engineer – John Hanes
- Mastering engineers – Chris Gehringer, Will Quinnell
- Engineers – Todd Tidwell, Steve Churchyard
- Cello – Jacob Braun, Erika Duke, Armen Ksajikian, Tim Landauer. Victor Lawrence, Dane Little
- Conductor and string arranger – Paul Buckmaster
- Contractor – Suzie Katayama
- Drums and drum programmers – Andre Davidson, Sean Davidson
- Mixer – Serban Ghenea
- Piano – Michael Pollack
- Programmers – Andre Davidson, Sean Davidson
- Viola – Zach Dellinger, Andrew Duckles, Darrin McCann, David Walther
- Violin – Charlie Bisharat, Mario De Leon, Joel Derouin, Bruce Dukov, Neel Hammond, Gerry Hilera, Songa Lee, Natalie Leggett, Serena McKinney, Lucia Micarelli, Sara Parkins, Michele Richards, Tereza Stanislav, John Wittenberg

== Charts ==
=== Weekly charts ===
Chart (2017–18)	Peak position
Canada AC (Billboard)	31
South Korea BGM (Gaon)	86
US Adult Contemporary (Billboard)	28
US Adult Pop Airplay (Billboard)	14
US Digital Song Sales (Billboard)	32

=== Year-end charts ===
Chart (2018)	Position
US Adult Top 40 (Billboard)	42

== Release history ==
List of releases showing region, date, format, record label, catalog number and reference
Region	Date	Format	Label	Catalog number	Ref.
Various	February 9, 2018	Streaming	Atlantic	USAT21703618	
United States	February 26, 2018	Hot adult contemporary radio	Atlantic; RRP	—N/a	
Various	March 23, 2018	Streaming – Remixes EP	Atlantic	075679874801	
