= Broken & Beautiful (song) =

Single by Kelly Clarkson

from the album UglyDolls (Original Motion Picture Soundtrack)
- Released: March 27, 2019
- Recorded: 2018
- Genre: Electropop
- Length: 3:39
- Label: Atlantic
- Songwriters: Christopher Comstock; Steve Mac; Johnny McDaid; Alecia Moore
- Producers: Marshmello; Steve Mac

Kelly Clarkson singles chronology
"Heat" (2018)	"Broken & Beautiful" (2019)	"I Dare You" (2020)

"Broken & Beautiful" is a song by American singer Kelly Clarkson from the soundtrack to the 2019 animated film UglyDolls. It was produced by American DJ Marshmello with British producer Steve Mac, both of whom had co-written the song with American singer Pink and Irish musician Johnny McDaid. The song was released by Atlantic Records as the soundtrack's lead single on March 27, 2019.

== Description ==
"Broken & Beautiful" is an uplifting electropop anthem written by Pink, Johnny McDaid, Marshmello, and Steve Mac, and produced by the latter two. It was released by Atlantic Records as the lead single to the soundtrack to the 2019 animated musical comedy film UglyDolls, to which Clarkson plays a lead role. In the song performed in A♭ major, the singer is searching for someone to love her as she is. Beginning with a four-chord synth pulse, the track utilizes a quiet-loud dynamic, with Clarkson belting in a high register on the chorus.

== Commercial performance ==
"Broken & Beautiful" debuted on the Billboard Kid Digital Song Sales chart on the week ending April 6, 2019, at number 4 and rose to the top of the chart the following week. That same week, it also entered the Billboard Digital Song Sales chart at number 25 with 9,000 digital song sales,. the Billboard Canadian Digital Song Sales chart at number 30, the Official New Zealand Hot Singles Chart at number 35, and on the Australian ARIA Digital Track Chart at number 48.

== Music video ==
The music video for the single was released on April 25, 2019, and was directed by Jay Martin.

== Live performances ==
During March 29–30, 2019, Clarkson premiered "Broken & Beautiful" live on the last two shows of her Meaning of Life Tour in Nashville, Tennessee, and Greenville, South Carolina. At the conclusion of the STX Entertainment presentation at CinemaCon in Las Vegas, she performed a rendition of the song. She has also performed it in live television: on the Tonight Show Starring Jimmy Fallon on April 3, 2019, and on The Today Show the following morning. On April 30, 2019, she performed it on The Voice, and at the 2019 Billboard Music Awards on May 1, 2019.

== Accolades ==
Awards and nominations for "Broken & Beautiful"
Organization	Year	Category	Result	Ref.
Billboard Music Awards	2019	N/A	Nominated	
Teen Choice Awards	2019	Choice Song from a Movie	Nominated	

== Charts ==
=== Weekly charts ===
Weekly chart performance for "Broken & Beautiful"
Chart (2019–2020)	Peak position
Australia Digital Tracks (ARIA)	48
Canada (Hot Canadian Digital Songs)	23
Canada Hot AC (Billboard)	38
New Zealand Hot Singles (RMNZ)	32
Scotland Singles (OCC)	89
US Bubbling Under Hot 100 (Billboard)	6
US Digital Song Sales (Billboard)	9
US Adult Contemporary (Billboard)	20
US Adult Pop Airplay (Billboard)	12

=== Year-end charts ===
Year-end chart performance for "Broken & Beautiful"
Chart (2019)	Position
US Adult Top 40 (Billboard)	47
US Kid Digital Song Sales (Billboard)	3

== Certifications ==
Certifications for "Broken & Beautiful"
Region	Certification	Certified units/sales
New Zealand (RMNZ)	Gold	15,000^{‡}
United Kingdom (BPI)	Silver	200,000^{‡}
United States (RIAA)	Gold	500,000^{‡}
^{‡} Sales+streaming figures based on certification alone.

== Credits and personnel ==
- Kelly Clarkson - vocals
- Marshmello - songwriter, production, programmer
- Steve Mac - songwriter, production
- Alecia Moore - songwriter
- Johnny McDaid - songwriter
- Manny Marroquin - mixer
- Robin Florent - mixer
- Scott Desmarais - mixer

== Release history ==
List of releases showing region, date, format, record label, catalog number and reference
Region	Date	Format	Label	Catalog number	Ref.
Various	March 27, 2019	Streaming	Atlantic	USAT21901877	
United States	March 27, 2019	Contemporary hit radio	Atlantic; Elektra	—N/a	
United States	March 27, 2019	Hot adult contemporary radio	Atlantic; Elektra	—N/a	
