= Harloe =

American singer-songwriter (born 1992)

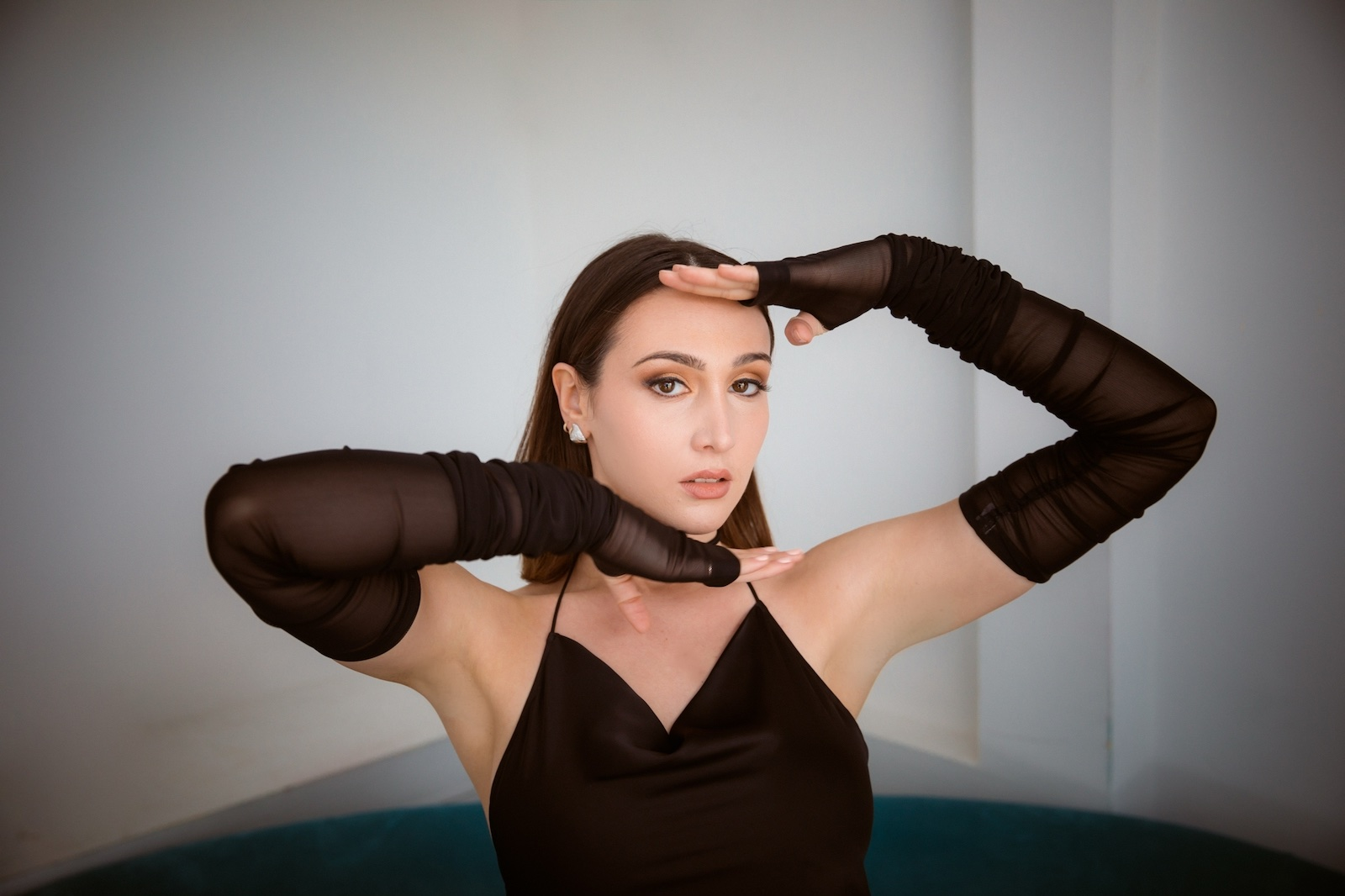

Background information
- Born: Jessica Ashley Karpov; July 10, 1992 (age 34); Queens, New York City, U.S.
- Genres: Contemporary R&B, soul, pop
- Occupations: Singer, songwriter, music producer
- Instruments: Piano, guitar, vocals
- Years active: 2009–present
- Labels: Roc Nation; Epic
- Website: Harloe on X

Jessica Ashley Karpov (born July 10, 1992), better known as Harloe (stylized in all caps), is an American singer and songwriter, based in Los Angeles. In addition to her career as a recording artist, Karpov co-wrote and co-produced four songs on Kelly Clarkson's 2017 album Meaning of Life, including the singles "I Don't Think About You" and "Heat". She has also written for Britney Spears,P!NK, Madonna, Charli XCX, Celine Dion, Zayn, K/DA, Sabrina Claudio, and Olivia Holt.

== Early life ==
Born in Queens, New York, Harloe is the child of Laura and Igor Karpov, and is of Ukrainian and Romanian descent. Her sister, Suzanne, is an opera singer. She graduated from Lynbrook Senior High School in Lynbrook, New York in 2010 and attended performing arts school at NYU Clive Davis School of Recorded Music in New York City.

== Career ==
=== As HARLOE (2016–present) ===
In 2016, she released her first single as Harloe, "All in My Feelings," featuring Dreezy. In 2017 she released the single "More Than Ever".In 2018, She Co-Wrote and Produced, "K/DA's" first Single "POP/STARS", for "Riot Games", "League Of Legends", with Sebastien Najand, Lydia Paek, and Minji Kim. In 2019 she wrote for, and was featured on Robin Schulz's single "All This Love". In 2019, Harloe began releasing music through Roc Nation. She released the single and music video for "Rivers Run Dry" on 1 October 2019. On 19 November 2019, she released the single and music video for "One More Chance". Her debut EP as Harloe, also titled Rivers Run Dry, was released in spring 2020.

Also in 2019, she provided the singing voice of Flora in the anime television series Carole & Tuesday.

=== As Jessica Ashley (2009–2015) ===
She has been performing, singing and dancing, publicly since 2009. In 2016, she released her first single as Harlœ, All in My Feelings. In 2012, she released an EP as Jessica Ashley, Prelude, featuring the singles "Souvenir", "24 Hours" and "Neverland". The video for "Neverland" starred actor Justin Gaston, with Ashley taking on the role of a contemporary Cinderella. In 2014, she signed a record deal with Epic Records.

== Discography ==
=== EPs ===
Title	Release details
Prelude	Released: 8 May 2012; Label: Nocturne; Formats: Digital download
Rivers Run Dry	Released: 13 March 2020; Label: Roc Nation; Formats: Digital download

=== Singles ===
Year	Title	Album
2012	"Souvenir"	Prelude
2012	"24 Hours"	Prelude
2012	"Neverland"	Prelude
2016	"All in My Feelings"	Non-album singles
2017	"More Than Ever"	Non-album singles
2019	"Rivers Run Dry"	Rivers Run Dry
2019	"One More Chance"	Rivers Run Dry
2020	"Crush On You"	Rivers Run Dry
2020	"Just Ain't Christmas"	Non-album singles
2021	"Liquid Truth"	Non-album singles
2021	"PWR RNGR" (featuring Mick Jenkins)	Non-album singles
2021	"Overthinking"	Non-album singles
2024	"Dreams"	Non-album singles
2024	"Free To Love"	Non-album singles

=== Guest appearances ===
Title	Year	Peak chart positions			Certifications	Album
Title	Year	AUT	GER	SWI	Certifications	Album
"Mr. Mystery" (Spadez feat. Jessica Ashley)	2011	—	—	—		
"No More Second Chances" (MKTO feat. Jessica Ashley)	2012	—	—	—		MKTO
"The Way We Were" (Mitch LJ & Luke Sky feat. Jessica Ashley)	2014	—	—	—		
"Over" (Spadez feat. Jessica Ashley)	2014	—	—	—		The Lost Tape
"Live & Learn" (Spadez feat. Jessica Ashley)	2014	—	—	—		The Lost Tape
"No More" (Spadez feat. Jessica Ashley)	2015	—	—	—		The Produce Section
"Just My Type" (Spadez feat. Jessica Ashley)	2015	—	—	—		The Produce Section
"One More Night" (Spadez feat. Jessica Ashley)	2015	—	—	—		The Produce Section
"All This Love" (Robin Schulz feat. Harlœ)	2019	32	26	28		IIII

== Songwriting discography ==
Title	Year	Artist	Album
"Cool"	2014	Maude	#HoldUp
"No More Second Chances" (featuring Jessica Ashley)	2014	MKTO	MKTO
"Unbreakable"	2014	Madison Beer	Non-album single
"Kinda Miss You"	2015	Deborah Cox	Work of Art
"Love Me Down"	2016	Britney Spears	Glory
"Secret (Shh)"	2016	Charli XCX	Vroom Vroom
"Thin Air" (featuring Jordan Fisher)	2016	Olivia Holt	Olivia
"Body Speak"	2016	Serayah	Empire: Original Soundtrack Season 2 Volume 2
"Heat"	2017	Kelly Clarkson	Meaning of Life
"Medicine"	2017	Kelly Clarkson	Meaning of Life
"Cruel"	2017	Kelly Clarkson	Meaning of Life
"I Don't Think About You"	2017	Kelly Clarkson	Meaning of Life
"Fresh Air"	2018	Zayn	Icarus Falls
"No Apologies"	2018	Nick Jonas	(Unreleased track)
"Run My Mouth"	2018	Ella Mai	Ella Mai
"Pop/Stars"	2018	K/DA	
"The Hard Way"	2019	Celine Dion	Courage
"As Long As You're Asleep"	2019	Sabrina Claudio	Truth Is
"Our Song"	2023	Pink	Trustfall
"I Won't Give Up"	2023	Kelly Clarkson	Chemistry
"School"	2026	Madonna	Confessions II
