= Heat (Kelly Clarkson song) =

Single by Kelly Clarkson

from the album Meaning of Life
- Released: July 27, 2018
- Recorded: 2017
- Studio: Starstruck Studios (Nashville, TN); Mick Schultz Studios (Tarzana, CA); Glenwood Place Studios (Burbank, CA)
- Genre: Soul
- Length: 3:10
- Label: Atlantic
- Songwriters: Andre Davidson; Sean Davidson; Mick Schultz; Jessica Ashley Karpov; Michael Pollack
- Producers: Mick Schultz; The Monarch

Kelly Clarkson singles chronology
"I Don't Think About You" (2018)	"Heat" (2018)	"Broken & Beautiful" (2019)

"Heat" is a song by American singer Kelly Clarkson, from her eighth studio album, Meaning of Life (2017). Originally written and produced by the production duo The Monarch, the final version of the track is co-written and co-produced by Mick Schultz with additional writing by Michael Pollack and production by American singer Harlœ and vocal production by Jesse Shatkin. Atlantic Records released the song as the album's third single on July 27, 2018, with a remix version by British DJ Luke Solomon. It reached number one on the US Billboard Dance Club Songs chart in March 2019. The song was featured in the Netflix show Soundtrack.

== Background and composition ==
"Heat" was originally written by the production duo The Monarch and Michael Pollack for Clarkson's debut album for Atlantic Records. According to Mick Schultz, Atlantic chairman and CEO Craig Kallman and A&R manager Carrie West approached him and his frequent collaborator Harlœ to re-produce the track after finishing recording another song, "Medicine", for Clarkson. He described the original recording as "rock and soulful", and ultimately produced two versions of it. He recalled that the process took days, remarking: "They (Atlantic) told me they wanted something out of the box, so I tried to really think about doing something left field. I ended up with (the version) that's on the album now." Schultz and Harlœ later received co-writing credits for the track. An uptempo soul number, Clarkson described its lyrics as giving a full commitment to a relationship. Rolling Stone contributor Maura Johnston described its music as recalling the "upbeat soul-tinged hits of the Nineties while possessing a decidedly 21st-century energy". AllMusic senior editor Stephen Thomas Erlewine also noted that the song has a "bit of gospel fire", while Spin's Katherine St. Asaph compared it to Adele's collaborations with Max Martin.

== Release and reception ==
In an interview with the Official Charts Company, Clarkson revealed plans to release "Heat" as a follow-up single from Meaning of Life. A remix by British DJ Luke Solomon was released by Atlantic as a single on July 27, 2018. A fan video was released on August 1, 2018, featuring Clarkson singing and dancing over the track accompanied by self-recorded footage of various enthusiasts performing their versions of it.

"Heat" received a positive response from music critics upon the release of Meaning of Life. Idolator's Mike Wass called the track the best song on the album, while Shaun Kitchener of the Daily Express praised the sheer confidence Clarkson exudes on the track. Reviewing for The Observer, Michael Cragg described the song as a "pure unadulterated joy".

== Live performances ==
Clarkson recorded a live performance of "Heat" in 2017 as part of her "Nashville Sessions" series at the War Memorial Auditorium in Nashville, Tennessee, which was later released on July 11, 2018. She also filmed a live performance of the track at the "Rocking and Stockings" content series sponsored by American chain store Cracker Barrel to promote the album during the 2017 holiday season. Clarkson presented the song in a live television performance at The Today Show on June 8, 2018. She has then included it on a medley presentation at the 2018 Radio Disney Music Awards and has also performed the track at the Macy's 4th of July Fireworks holiday special on July 4, 2018. On August 27, 2018, Clarkson opended the 2018 US Open, with a medley of her hits which included the song. Clarkson performed the song during the 92nd Annual Macy's Thanksgiving Day Parade on November 22, 2018. She broke Macy's tradition by singing the vocals live rather than lip syncing to the track. She also performed the song on The Voice on December 4, 2018, and on NBC's New Year's Eve. Clarkson was featured singing the song on the fourth episode of The Morning Show, which premiered on November 9, 2019.

== Track listing ==
Digital streaming – Luke Solomon Remix

No.	Title	Length
1.	"Heat" (Luke Solomon Remix)	3:31
2.	"Heat" (Luke Solomon Fire Dub)	5:11

Digital streaming – Single

No.	Title	Length
1.	"Heat"	3:10

Digital streaming – Niko the Kid Remix

No.	Title	Length
1.	"Heat" (Niko the Kid Remix)	3:32

Digital streaming – Paul Morrell Remix

No.	Title	Length
1.	"Heat" (Paul Morrell Remix)	3:20

Digital streaming – Easy Star All-Stars & Michael Goldwasser Reggae Remix

No.	Title	Length
1.	"Heat" (Easy Star All-Stars & Michael Goldwasser Reggae Remix)	2:56

Digital streaming – Wolves by Night Remix

No.	Title	Length
1.	"Heat" (Wolves by Night Remix)	3:09

Digital streaming – Bynon Remix

No.	Title	Length
1.	"Heat" (Bynon Remix)	3:32

== Personnel ==
Credits lifted the album's liner notes.

- Lead vocals – Kelly Clarkson
- Background vocals – Nicole Hurst, Bridget Sarai, Jessica Karpov
- Producers – The Monarch, Mick Schultz
- Vocal producers – Jesse Shatkin, Jessica Karpov, The Monarch
- Mixing engineer – John Hanes
- Mastering engineers – Chris Gehringer, Will Quinnell
- Engineers – Iain Findlay, Jesse Shatkin, Mick Schultz, Todd Tidwell, Steve Churchyard
- Guitars – Eric Peterson
- Bass – Brian Schultz
- Mixer – Serban Ghenea
- Programmer – Mick Shultz, The Monarch

== Charts ==
=== Weekly charts ===
Chart (2018–2019)	Peak position
Canada AC (Billboard)	45
Canada Hot AC (Billboard)	40
US Adult Contemporary (Billboard)	28
US Adult Pop Airplay (Billboard)	14
US Dance Club Songs (Billboard)	1

=== Year-end charts ===
Chart (2019)	Position
US Adult Top 40 (Billboard)	45
US Dance Club Songs (Billboard)	19

== Release history ==
List of releases showing region, date, format, record label, catalog number and reference
Region	Date	Format	Label	Catalog number	Ref.
Various	July 27, 2018	Streaming – Luke Solomon Remix	Atlantic; Big Beat	075679865595	
United States	November 7, 2018	Hot adult contemporary radio	Atlantic; EMG	—N/a	
Various	December 7, 2018	Streaming – Single	Atlantic	USAT21703611	
Various	December 14, 2018	Streaming – Niko the Kid Remix	Atlantic	USAT21812906	
Various	January 4, 2019	Streaming – Paul Morrell Remix	Atlantic	USAT21812907	
Various	January 4, 2019	Streaming – Easy Star All-Stars & Michael Goldwasser Reggae Remix	Atlantic	USAT21812908	
Various	January 18, 2019	Streaming – Wolves by Night Remix	Atlantic	USAT21812909	
Various	January 18, 2019	Streaming – Bynon Remix	Atlantic	USAT21900566	

== See also ==
- List of Billboard number-one dance songs of 2019
