= It's Quiet Uptown =

Song in the musical "Hamilton"

Song by Renée Elise Goldsberry with Lin-Manuel Miranda, Phillipa Soo, and the cast of Hamilton

from the album Hamilton
- Released: 2015
- Genre: Ballad; show tune
- Length: 4:30
- Songwriter: Lin-Manuel Miranda

Audio
- "It's Quiet Uptown" on YouTube

"It's Quiet Uptown" is the eighteenth song from Act 2 of the musical Hamilton, based on the life of Alexander Hamilton, which premiered on Broadway in 2015. Lin-Manuel Miranda wrote both the music and lyrics to the song. The song takes place as, in the second act of the musical, the characters Alexander Hamilton and his wife Eliza grieve over their son's death.

== Background ==
Alex Lacamoire, Hamilton's musical director, said the show's best use of strings is "probably 'It's Quiet Uptown', when there's nothing else playing except those two guys. The lyrics 'It's quiet uptown'—you're not getting quieter than two strings playing gently."

== Synopsis ==
The song describes Alexander Hamilton and his wife Eliza's grief as they try to accept their son Philip's death. This "hushed instrumental" sees them "reflect on everything that has happened over the course of their lives together." As Hamilton and Eliza silently walk the streets of the city at night, passersby look on them with pity and say that the two are "going through the unimaginable." Through their grieving, Alexander begs for forgiveness for what he has done to Eliza (his affair with Maria Reynolds) so he can help her through Philip's death, to which she silently agrees as they begin to mend their relationship. The song is narrated by Eliza's sister, Angelica, and the chorus.

== Analysis ==
The Huffington Post offers an explanation to the vague nondescript language used throughout the song: "Our guide, our word-playing, rhyming, subtle, subtextual, double-meaning beacon of logic and reason is utterly unable to comprehend the death of his son, rendered speechless. By telling us that he can't tell us about it, Miranda shows us Hamilton's despair."

The New York Times likened the song to "Biggie's 'Suicidal Thoughts,' still one of the most chilling hip-hop songs of all time", as they both "confront [their] own mortality...end[ing] up exhausted, frayed, desperate." Varsity suggests the song is influenced by Laurence O'Keefe.

== Critical reception ==
The song has received critical acclaim.

New York Theatre Guide wrote that the song "literally left me a tear-stained wreck of a human being." Entertainment Weekly said the song "[isn't] afraid to slow the story down for moments of hushed sincerity." Charles McNulty of the Los Angeles Times said "No contemporary musical has touched grief in a song as profoundly as 'It's Quiet Uptown,' which I'll confess is impossible for me to listen to without tearing up." Entertainment Monthly said the song is "one of Miranda's most poetic numbers." Patheos says the song is "tear-jerking because of the way...it takes a death to bring [Eliza and Hamilton] together" after his infidelity. TheatreMania said the "tearjerker" is "devastatingly beautiful." The Hollywood Reporter wrote that the "exquisite [song] resonates with such raw, wrenching feeling it elicits sobs from the audience." Record Collector News noted the song "slows the pace to capture Hamilton's grief over a loss", describing it as "one of the saddest songs ever heard since Jacques Brel's 'The Desperate Ones.'" Hannah McFadden from Yakima Herald said the song "always leaves me a sniveling and pathetic mess." Papyrus wrote "I have listened to the full album around twenty times now...and I have not been able to listen to this full song without crying." Noisey said the song is "agonized" and "atypically melodic." Library Journal explained that the song is "guaranteed to make me cry just thinking about it."

== Certifications ==
Region	Certification	Certified units/sales
United Kingdom (BPI)	Silver	200,000^{‡}
^{‡} Sales+streaming figures based on certification alone.

== Mixtape version ==
"It's Quiet Uptown"

Promotional single by Kelly Clarkson

from the album The Hamilton Mixtape
- Released: November 3, 2016
- Recorded: 2016
- Genre: Electropop; R&B
- Length: 4:37
- Label: Atlantic
- Songwriter: Lin-Manuel Miranda

Audio
- "It's Quiet Uptown" on YouTube

Released on November 3, 2016, alongside "My Shot", American singer Kelly Clarkson released a mixtape version of "It's Quiet Uptown" as a promotional single from the mixtape album The Hamilton Mixtape (2016). Clarkson's version peaked at number 30 on the Adult Pop Songs chart.

In 2009, Lin-Manuel Miranda began a project entitled The Hamilton Mixtape that would eventually transform into the 2015 Broadway musical Hamilton. During the development of the musical production, Miranda frequently communicated that a "mixtape" of select songs from the show's score was being recorded.

Clarkson performed the song live on several occasions. Clarkson's first public performance of the song happened on Today on December 5, 2016. She performed an acoustic version of the song at the Honda Stage at iHeartRadio NY on December 13, 2016. The same day she sang the song as a duet with finalist Billy Gilman on season 11 of The Voice. On December 31, 2016, she performed the song on the New Year's Special of Late Night with Seth Meyers. She also performed the song in the encore set during her 2019 Meaning of Life Tour.

=== Charts ===
Chart (2016)	Peak position
US Bubbling Under Hot 100 (Billboard)	24
US Digital Song Sales (Billboard)	47
US Adult Contemporary (Billboard)	30
US Adult Pop Airplay (Billboard)	30
