= Meaning of Life (Kelly Clarkson song) =

Promotional single by Kelly Clarkson

from the album Meaning of Life
- Released: October 19, 2017
- Recorded: 2016
- Studio: Vox Recording (Los Angeles, CA); The Ribcage (Los Angeles, CA); Echo Studios (Los Angeles, CA); Starstruck Studios (Nashville, TN); Milkboy the Studio (Philadelphia, PA)
- Genre: Soul pop; R&B
- Length: 3:51
- Label: Atlantic
- Songwriters: Jesse Shatkin; Ilsey Juber; James Morrison
- Producer: Jesse Shatkin

Music video
- "Meaning of Life" on YouTube

"Meaning of Life" is a song by American recording artist Kelly Clarkson and the titular track from her eighth studio album of the same name. It was written by English singer James Morrison with Ilsey Juber and Jesse Shatkin, who handled its production. A soul pop and R&B song about learning the existential "meaning of life", the singer confesses the loneliness she's been feeling in the past but her newfound love is what brings her to life, showing her the light. Originally intended to be recorded for her 2015 studio album Piece by Piece, Clarkson put the song on hold and used it as a guiding track for other collaborators in developing a soulful sound for the succeeding album.

"Meaning of Life" was issued by Atlantic Records as a promotional single on October 19, 2017, a week before the album's release. An accompanying music video was released on May 14, 2018, in celebration of Mother's Day, and features Clarkson with her own children, which symbolizes her "meaning of life". To promote the album, Clarkson performed the track at the fifteenth series of the British program Strictly Come Dancing.

== Composition and recording ==
"Meaning of Life"
Originally written for the Piece by Piece album, the titular track 'Meaning of Life" served as a guiding point for other collaborators in creating the soulful sound of the album of the same name.

"Meaning of Life" was written by James Morrison with Ilsey Juber and Jesse Shatkin, who produced the track. A doo-wop soul pop and R&B song, it sings of learning the "meaning of life", during which the singer confesses the loneliness she's been feeling but her love is what brings her to life, showing her the light. Billboard editor Chris Malone noted that song can be about an estranged lover, with the singer yearns "for how things used to be, and how much better they made her feel". While Los Angeles Times music critic Michael Wood ascribed the song as reflective to Clarkson's family life. The track begins with a stripped-down production and a despondent atmosphere as Clarkson "tends to a broken heart over punchy drums and an ominous bass line", with the singer injecting a more soulful performance as at each colossal chorus.

Morrison and Shatkin originally pitched the song for Clarkson's seventh studio album Piece by Piece in 2014, but Clarkson felt that the lyrical content of the track was unsuitable to the album's theme at the time. She later put a hold the composition and used it as a guiding point in recording the follow-up studio album, which she later named after the song, deeming that material represented from the rest of the tracks centers on the "meaning of life"—which to her means that "life is all about connection". Clarkson stated that the song "started this entire project", and that the vibe, soul, and message it was very critical in showing other writers and producers of the new soulful sound they were aiming to achieve to avoid pop-oriented material similar to her previous albums. As the first song selected for inclusion to the album, she remarked that it signaled a departure from previous records, and that it also acts as a statement about how she felt "right now". explaining that "There's something to loving your personal life and also your work life, and being able to choose who I work with after my American Idol contract finished. It feels like a new chapter."

== Release and reception ==
"Meaning of Life" was released on October 19, 2017, as a promotional single a week before the album's street date, accompanied by a live performance video filmed at the War Memorial Auditorium in Nashville, Tennessee, as part of the Meaning of Life's "Nashville Sessions" promotional campaign. Clarkson has only performed the song in live television once at the fifteenth series of the British program Strictly Come Dancing on November 26, 2017. She had also performed it on the Billboard Women in Music event on November 30, 2017, after which she honored with the "Powerhouse Award".

Harper's Bazaar's Erica Gonzales opined that the song "packs one soulful punch", and that Clarkson's "soulful, booming vocals take center stage" on it. Jon Blistein of Rolling Stone described the track as "euphoric" and its "Nashville Sessions" performance as a "striking one". In his review of the album for the Los Angeles Times, Wood meanwhile lamented that the song's lines are hardly taking advantage of Clarkson's newfound creative license and "could be sharper".

== Music video ==
A companion music video for the song premiered on May 13, 2018, in celebration of Mother's Day. Filmed by Sarah McColgan, it features Clarkson wandering in a dim-lit mansion. Midway towards the chorus, a golden light begins to cascade to its flower-filled halls which burst with a colorful atmosphere, where she is surrounded by a performing band. The video concludes with Clarkson accompanied by her children, which represent her "meaning of life". Country Living's Jessica Mattern noted that the video shows how her family with her husband has transformed her life. E! Online's Johnni Macke described it as a "cinematic dream" and wrote that "It's simple in some respects but dramatic in tone, location and wardrobe, which we love".

== Personnel ==
Credits lifted from the album's liner notes.

- Lead vocals – Kelly Clarkson
- Background vocals – Nicole Hurst, Bridget Sarai
- Drum programmer, drums, guitar, keyboards, synthesizer – Jesse Shatkin
- Mixing engineer – John Hanes
- Mastering engineers – Chris Gehringer, Will Quinnell
- Engineers – Jeff Chestek, Jesse Shatkin, Michael Harris
- Additional engineer – Samuel Dent
- Assistant engineers – Chris Cerullo*, Joel Metzler, Todd Tidwell
- Cello – Glenn Fischbach, Jennie Lorenzo
- Conductor and string arranger – Larry Gold
- Production coordinator – JoAnn Tominaga
- Horns – The Regiment Horns
- Mixer – Serban Ghenea
- Organ – Buddy Ross
- Piano – Buddy Ross, Jesse Shatkin
- Producer, additional programmer – Jesse Shatkin
- Saxophone (Baritone, Tenor) – Leon Silva
- Trumpet, flugelhorn – Sean Erick
- Trombone, tuba – Kevin Williams Jr.
- Viola – Davis Barnett, Jonathan Kim
- Violin – Charles Parker, Emma Kummrow, Gared Crawford, Henry Flory, Luigi Mazzocchi, Piotr Filochowski

== Chart history ==
Chart (2017–18)	Peak position
Slovakia (Rádio Top 100)	71
