= Roll the Dice (band) =

Roll The Dice
- Origin: Stockholm, Sweden
- Genres: Electronic, Ambient
- Years active: 2007–present
- Labels: Digitalis, The Leaf Label
- Members: Malcolm Pardon; Peder Mannerfelt

Roll The Dice (band) is an analogue electronic duo from Stockholm, Sweden signed to The Leaf Label. A self-titled debut album was released in 2010 on Digitalis Recordings and a second full length is released in 2011.

The band is composed of Peder Mannerfelt and Malcolm Pardon. Mannerfelt, also known as The Subliminal Kid, produces and performs live with Fever Ray. Pardon was a member of Kinky Machine in the early 90s but left the band when he emigrated to Sweden to pursue a career in TV and film composition.

== Members ==
- Malcolm Pardon
- Peder Mannerfelt

== Discography ==
=== Studio albums ===
- Roll The Dice - (2010) Digitalis Recordings
- In Dust - (2011) The Leaf Label
- Until Silence - (2014) The Leaf Label

=== EPs ===
- Live in Gothenburg - August 7, 2010 (2011) The Leaf Label
