= The Monarch (production team) =

- Origin: Orlando, Florida, U.S. (Currently in Los Angeles, California)
- Genres: Pop; dance-pop; hip hop; R&B
- Instruments: Macintosh computer, Studio One; Pro Tools
- Years active: 2008−present
- Members: Andre "Dre" Davidson; Sean "Sean D" Davidson

The Monarch is a music production and songwriting duo originally from Orlando, Florida, consisting of Andre "Dre" Davidson and Sean "Sean D" Davidson. Currently residing in Los Angeles, they are best known for producing and co-writing Tiesto "Both" featuring 21 Savage and Bia, Zara Larsson and David Guetta's "On My Love", six songs on Kelly Clarkson's Meaning of Life, 2× platinum single "All Eyes On You" by Meek Mill and Nicki Minaj, "Take It to the Head" by DJ Khaled, as well as How We Do (Party) by Rita Ora, and Cher Lloyd's debut single Swagger Jagger which both debuted at #1 on the UK Singles Chart The Monarch has also produced several other songs for Justin Bieber, Robin Thicke, Chris Brown, Kevin Gates, DJ Khaled, Nicki Minaj, and Lil Wayne.
