= 2 Worlds 2 Voices Tour =

2008 concert tour by Reba McEntire and Kelly Clarkson

- Tour by Reba McEntire and Kelly Clarkson
- Promotional poster for tour
- Start date: January 17, 2008
- End date: November 22, 2008
- Legs: 2
- No. of shows: 39 Total
Reba McEntire tour chronology
Key to the Heart Tour (2007)	2 Worlds 2 Voices Tour (2008)	Reba McEntire 2008 Tour (2008)
Kelly Clarkson tour chronology
My December Tour (2007–08)	2 Worlds 2 Voices Tour (2008)	All I Ever Wanted Summer Fair Tour (2009)

The 2 Worlds 2 Voices Tour was a co-headlining concert tour by American recording artists Reba McEntire and Kelly Clarkson that took place in two segments during 2008. The tour only visited North America. The tour's shows featured the two singers sharing the same band and stage and performing each other's songs.

== Background ==
Deemed "one of pop music's most curious couplings" by USA Today – the tour involving the cross-genre, cross-generational pairing came about as a consequence of Clarkson's career battles surrounding the release of her 2007 album, My December. Clarkson left her previous management, The Firm, Inc., and joined a management company headed by McEntire's husband, Narvel Blackstock. The two teamed up together for McEntire's Reba: Duets album, released in September 2007, as well as on the television program CMT Crossroads, in the process, discovering "a spark between the two" of them.

It was rumored in October 2007, by one of McEntire's band members that the two singers would tour together and the first date was confirmed on November 14, 2007, by West Virginia station WTRF-TV. The tour was officially announced on November 15.

The tour's dates took place in between legs of Clarkson's My December Tour. Unlike that tour, on 2 Worlds 2 Voices Clarkson avoided material from My December, performing only two songs from it. The first leg of the tour proved to be an overwhelming success, selling out all fifteen shows and grossing over US$7 million, and performing to over 400,000 people.

On May 15, dates for a September to November leg of the tour were confirmed by both Clarkson's and McEntire's websites.

== Opening act ==
- Melissa Peterman

== Setlist ==
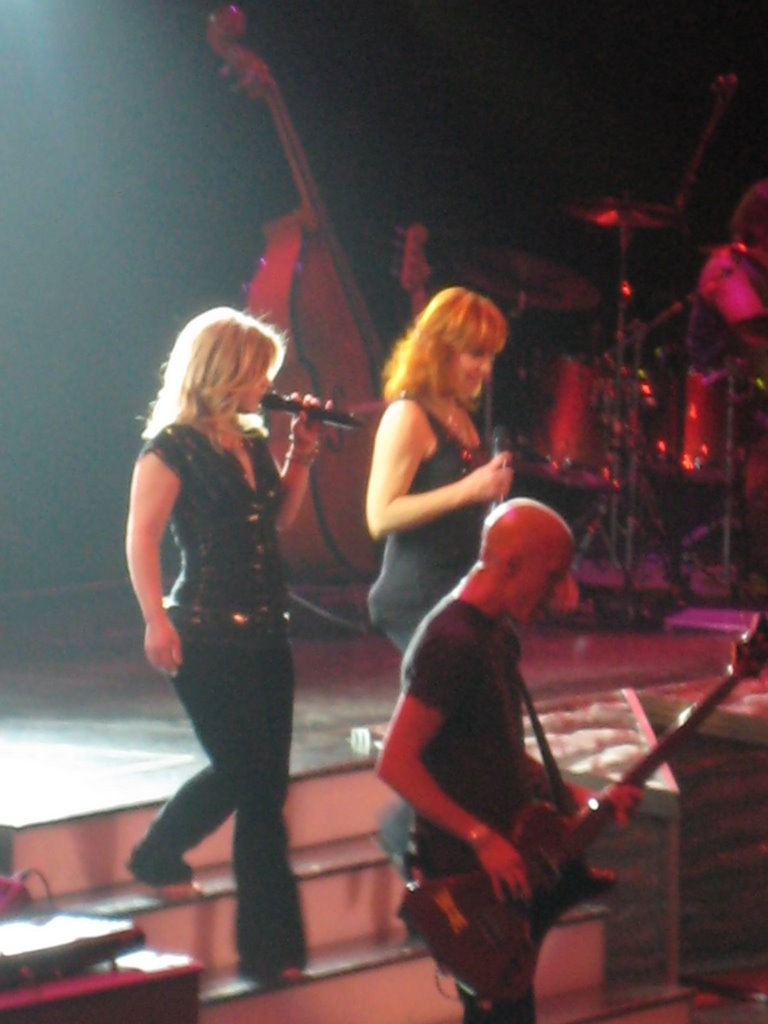
Clarkson and McEntire performing "Since U Been Gone"

Leg 1

January 17 – February 16, 2008

1. "Sweet Dreams" (Instrumental introduction)
2. "Sweet Dreams (Are Made of This)"
3. "Why Haven't I Heard from You"
4. "Walk Away"
5. "The Night the Lights Went Out in Georgia" (McEntire solo)
6. "Behind These Hazel Eyes" (Clarkson solo)
7. "The Fear of Being Alone"
8. "Beautiful Disaster"
9. "Sleeping with the Telephone"
10. "Miss Independent" (Clarkson solo)
11. "The Greatest Man I Never Knew"
12. "Cathy's Clown"
13. "Up to the Mountain"
14. Medley: "How Blue" / "One Promise Too Late"
15. "Be Still"
16. "Love Revival"
17. "Never Again" (Clarkson solo)
18. "And Still" (McEntire solo)
19. "Breakaway"
20. "Does He Love You"
21. "Is There Life Out There" (McEntire solo)
22. "I'm a Survivor" (performed with Peterman)
23. "A Moment Like This"

Encore

24. "Since U Been Gone"
25. "Because of You"
26. "Fancy"
Leg 2

September 25 – November 22, 2008

1. "Sweet Dreams" (Instrumental introduction)
2. "Sweet Dreams (Are Made of This)"
3. "Why Haven't I Heard From You"
4. "Walk Away"
5. "The Night the Lights Went Out in Georgia" (McEntire solo)
6. "Behind These Hazel Eyes" (Clarkson solo)
7. "The Fear of Being Alone"
8. "Beautiful Disaster"
9. "Why Not Tonight" (McEntire solo)
10. "Stuff Like That There" (Clarkson solo)
11. "Miss Independent" (Clarkson solo)
12. "The Greatest Man I Never Knew"
13. "Cathy's Clown"
14. "Up to the Mountain"
15. Medley: "How Blue" / "One Promise Too Late"
16. "Be Still"
17. "Love Revival"
18. "Never Again" (Clarkson solo)
19. "And Still" (McEntire solo)
20. "Breakaway"
21. "Does He Love You"
22. "Is There Life Out There" (McEntire solo)
23. "I'm a Survivor" (performed with Peterman)
24. "A Moment Like This"

Encore

25. "Since U Been Gone"
26. "Because of You"
27. "Fancy"

== Tour dates ==
Date	City	Country	Venue
North America Leg 1
January 17, 2008	Dayton	United States	Nutter Center
January 18, 2008	Louisville	United States	Freedom Hall
January 19, 2008	Morgantown	United States	WVU Coliseum
January 24, 2008	Norfolk	United States	Norfolk Scope
January 25, 2008	Winston-Salem	United States	LJVM Coliseum
January 26, 2008	Fayetteville	United States	Cumberland County Crown Coliseum
January 31, 2008	Valley Center	United States	Britt Brown Arena
February 1, 2008	Tulsa	United States	Mabee Center
February 2, 2008	Bossier City	United States	CenturyTel Center
February 7, 2008	St. Charles	United States	Family Arena
February 8, 2008	Indianapolis	United States	Conseco Fieldhouse
February 9, 2008	Rockford	United States	Rockford MetroCentre
February 14, 2008	Tupelo	United States	BancorpSouth Arena
February 15, 2008	Jonesboro	United States	Convocation Center
February 16, 2008	Kansas City	United States	Sprint Center
North America Leg 2
September 25, 2008	Winnipeg	Canada	MTS Centre
September 26, 2008	Saskatoon	Canada	Credit Union Centre
September 27, 2008	Edmonton	Canada	Rexall Place
October 9, 2008	Boise	United States	Taco Bell Arena
October 10, 2008	Salt Lake City	United States	EnergySolutions Arena
October 11, 2008	Reno	United States	Reno Events Center
October 16, 2008	Fort Wayne	United States	Allen County War Memorial Coliseum
October 17, 2008	Pittsburgh	United States	Mellon Arena
October 18, 2008	Reading	United States	Sovereign Center
October 23, 2008	Grand Forks	United States	Ralph Engelstad Arena
October 24, 2008	Minneapolis	United States	Target Center
October 25, 2008	Moline	United States	iWireless Center
October 30, 2008	Charlottesville	United States	John Paul Jones Arena
October 31, 2008	University Park	United States	Bryce Jordan Center
November 1, 2008	Bridgeport	United States	The Arena at Harbor Yard
November 6, 2008	Albany	United States	Times Union Center
November 7, 2008	Cleveland	United States	Wolstein Center
November 8, 2008	Grand Rapids	United States	Van Andel Arena
November 13, 2008	Biloxi	United States	Mississippi Coast Coliseum
November 14, 2008	Birmingham	United States	BJCC Arena
November 15, 2008	North Little Rock	United States	Alltel Arena
November 20, 2008	Columbus	United States	Value City Arena
November 21, 2008	Charlotte	United States	Time Warner Cable Arena
November 22, 2008	Baltimore	United States	1st Mariner Arena

=== Box office score data ===
Venue	City	Tickets sold / available	Gross revenue
Nutter Center	Dayton	9,296 / 9,296 (100%)	$465,774
Sovereign Center	Reading	6,231 / 6,231(100%)	$382,227
Target Center	Minneapolis	5,203 / 6,766 (77%)	$238,033
Bryce Jordan Center	University Park	5,621 / 6,565 (86%)	$132,728
Van Andel Arena	Grand Rapids	6,199 / 6,463 (96%)	$310,501
1st Mariner Arena	Baltimore	7,335 / 8,338 (88%)	$372,253
TOTAL		39,885 / 43,689 (91%)	$1,901,516

== Critical reception ==
Overall, the tour received positive reviews throughout its run. Many critics praised McEntire's ability to adapt her country roots into a rock and roll atmosphere. Although McEntire was given the highest praise, many admired Clarkson's ability to stand her ground amongst music's biggest legends. However, one critic noted Clarkson's awe of McEntire, writing that at times she seemed a bit star struck. The critic went on to state: "McEntire exhibited a honed mastery of the material – be it Clarkson's or her own – and a professional command of the stage. Clarkson will undoubtedly learn a lot in the coming month." Brian Dukes of the Fayetteville Observer wrote: "When the pair teamed up on Clarkson's "Beautiful Disaster", there was no question why McEntire and Clarkson had toured together. A better question would be: "Why did they wait so long?", while Craig Shelbrune from CMT wrote, "...2 Worlds, 2 Voices is likely to go down as one of McEntire's most memorable tours."
