= My December Tour =

2007–08 concert tour by Kelly Clarkson

- Tour by Kelly Clarkson
- Promotional poster for the tour
- Associated album: My December
- Start date: September 28, 2007
- End date: April 13, 2008
- Legs: 4
- No. of shows: 8 in Australia; 27 in North America; 18 in Europe; 53 Total

Kelly Clarkson concert chronology
- Addicted Tour (2006); My December Tour (2007–08); 2 Worlds 2 Voices Tour (2008)

The My December Tour was the fourth headlining concert tour by American pop rock recording artist Kelly Clarkson, and followed the release Clarkson's third studio album, My December (2007). Originally a large-scale summer tour timed to coincide with the June 2007 availability of the album, public career battles and poor ticket sales in North America led Clarkson to cancel it before it began. A considerably smaller-scale tour commenced in September 2007 and ran to April 2008, with the international legs in Europe and Australia remaining at arena venues.

== Background ==
=== First incarnation ===
Promotional poster for first incarnation of tour

The tour was initially announced by both Billboard.com and Clarkson's official website on April 26, 2007. It was scheduled for almost 40 dates in North America, running from July 7 to September 28, 2007, beginning in Portland, Oregon's Rose Garden Arena, including such venues as the TD BankNorth Garden in Boston and Continental Airlines Arena in New Jersey, and concluding at the MGM Grand Garden Arena in Las Vegas. For the first time, Clarkson would be playing in arenas instead of the smaller amphitheatres that her previous tours were staged in. Describing the tour, Clarkson stated, "This will be the biggest tour I’ve ever done. It's all about the music – we’re bringing extra musicians and we’ll be making an arena environment intimate because I want the fans to be part of the show! And you’ll hear all your favorite hits too!!" The show would feature a 36-row catwalk and b-stage, in order to make the large arenas more intimate for fans. Mat Kearney would be her support act for the tour.

The tour was to be sponsored by Vitamin Water. The company set up an exclusive website, kellyallaccess.com, which offered a pre-sale through Ticketmaster as well as other cross-promotional activities with Clarkson. Tickets went on sale on May 12 and prospects for the tour got caught up in Clarkson's very public career drama concerning the contents and commercial potential of My December, her relations with record company boss Clive Davis, and her falling out with her own management.

On Thursday, June 14, the tour was cancelled per Clarkson's official website, with her statement saying:

I can't tell you how much I've been looking forward to getting out there to perform for y'all. In the craziness of the music business, performing is what I look forward to doing the most, so it really is disappointing for me to have to tell you that I won't be coming out to tour this summer. The fact is that touring is just too much too soon. But I promise you that we're going to get back out there as soon as is humanly possible to give you a show that will be even better. Thanks for all of your love and continued support.

However, low ticket sales were acknowledged by promoters and her representatives as the reason for the cancellation. LiveNation CEO Michael Rapino said: "Ticket sales have not been what we anticipated and we came to the realization that we had bit off more than we could chew. In the end, we are in the Kelly Clarkson business and for that reason we believe that this decision will only benefit her and her fans in the long run."

The My December album itself was finally released on June 26, 2007, and within a few weeks it was clear that its sales would be considerably less than those of her previous two albums. The only public performances to survive the tour cancellation were her five-song set at the Live Earth concert at Giants Stadium on July 7, 2007, and various promotional appearances on morning and late-night television programs in conjunction with the album's release.

=== Second incarnation ===
On September 4, 2007, a new My December Tour for Fall 2007 in North America was announced on via Billboard.com. It was specified to play 26 dates in 3,000- to 6,000-seat theatres rather than the previous arenas. Her three shows at New York City's Beacon Theatre all sold out, and her performance at the Tower Theater outside Philadelphia nearly did. Shows in Toronto, Minneapolis, and Chicago also sold out.

Clarkson then added Australian and European legs to the tour, to take place starting March 2008, after the first leg of her 2 Worlds 2 Voices Tour with Reba McEntire. The singles from My December had gotten a somewhat better reception in Australia than in the U.S., and Clarkson was following the strategy of scheduling dates there that the Dixie Chicks had following for their similarly sales-challenged Accidents & Accusations Tour of 2006. Tickets for the Australian tour went on sale October 8, 2007. On October 23, 2007, the full European lineup was announced and tickets went on sale immediately. German, Swedish and Dutch tickets went on sale for fans through a number of different ticketing websites and stores across the continent. Although Sony BMG UK set up an official pre-sale for fans through Live Nation, Ents24.com and Seetickets, Orange UK set up a "reserve ticket" system through WAP on their website, for registered Orange users within the UK. There was a high demand for Glasgow and Manchester fans and a further date was added for each within a week. Clarkson scheduled an appearance on the UK TV show This Morning on December 12 to promote the UK leg of the tour.

== The show ==
Clarkson performing "Miss Independent".

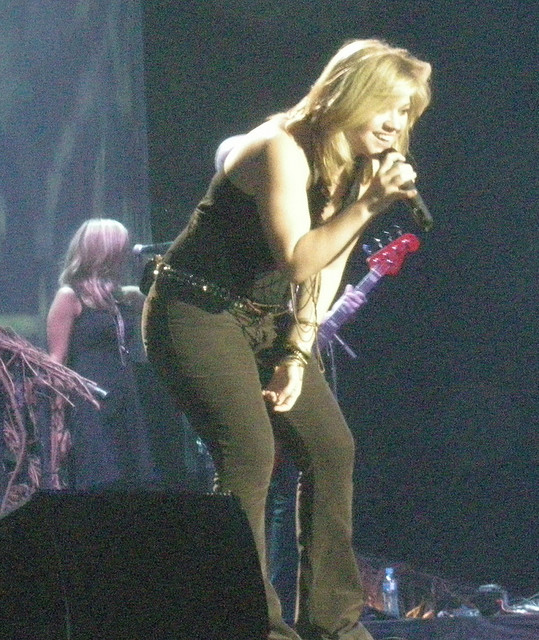
Clarkson on April 6, 2008.

As in the past, Clarkson's concerts held more in common with traditional rock concerts than with pop- or R&B-oriented "diva" productions. The show began with a stage tableau of the cover of the My December album, complete with staircase laced with gnarly tree branches and Clarkson sitting in the big red dress while the band was frozen like mannequins. Clarkson immediately shed the bulky red dress, however, and performed in an understated black pants and back top outfit. Halfway through the show the main curtain closed, and Clarkson and selected band members performed a quieter mini-set of "Because of You", "Up to the Mountain", and "Be Still" in front of the curtain. A mash-up of "Miss Independent" and Led Zeppelin's "Whole Lotta Love" AC/DC's "Back in Black" then played for a while over the sound system; when the curtain opened the set had been stripped to a techno-modern look, while Clarkson had undergone the minimal costume change of adding a black sleeveless vest. The single encores segment began with a respectfully delivered "Sober" followed by the informal "Chivas" and then her biggest hit, "Since U Been Gone", the last of which typically featured sing-alongs or dancing fans pulled up on stage. In all she typically performed for 75 to 80 minutes.

The show's set list was dominated by My December and Breakaway material, with only "Miss Independent" and "Beautiful Disaster" appearing from her first album Thankful and the only indicator of her American Idol heritage her introduction to the Idol Gives Back showstopper "Up to the Mountain". Clarkson's concert audience in the U.S. was sometimes composed of high school and younger college age people, predominantly female, and preteen girls accompanied by one or both parents, but also sometimes connected with her radio audience, which includes widespread play on adult contemporary stations. The music presented in the show was more conventionally rock-oriented than her concert audience profile might indicate. Clarkson's between-songs stage patter typically made only a few allusions to her career adventures with the My December album. At the start of the tour, she introduced My December material carefully. Near the close of shows, she thanked the audience for giving this chance to her to perform her songs, saying that all the other facets of the music industry paled in importance. She gave more extensive introductions for "Hole" and "Up to the Mountain", which she said did not fit her normal sound.

Rock critic Greg Kot analyzed the show as portraying three possible career paths for Clarkson: Goth vixen, pop princess, and ballad singer. He suggested that the last of these was where her best chance at artistic growth lay, saying that her mid-concert quiet set had been "a revelation".

== Opening acts ==
- Jon McLaughlin (North America)
- Sean Kingston (Australia) (select venues)
- Mandy Moore (Australia) (select venues)
- Jamie Scott and the Town (Europe) (select venues)

== Set list ==
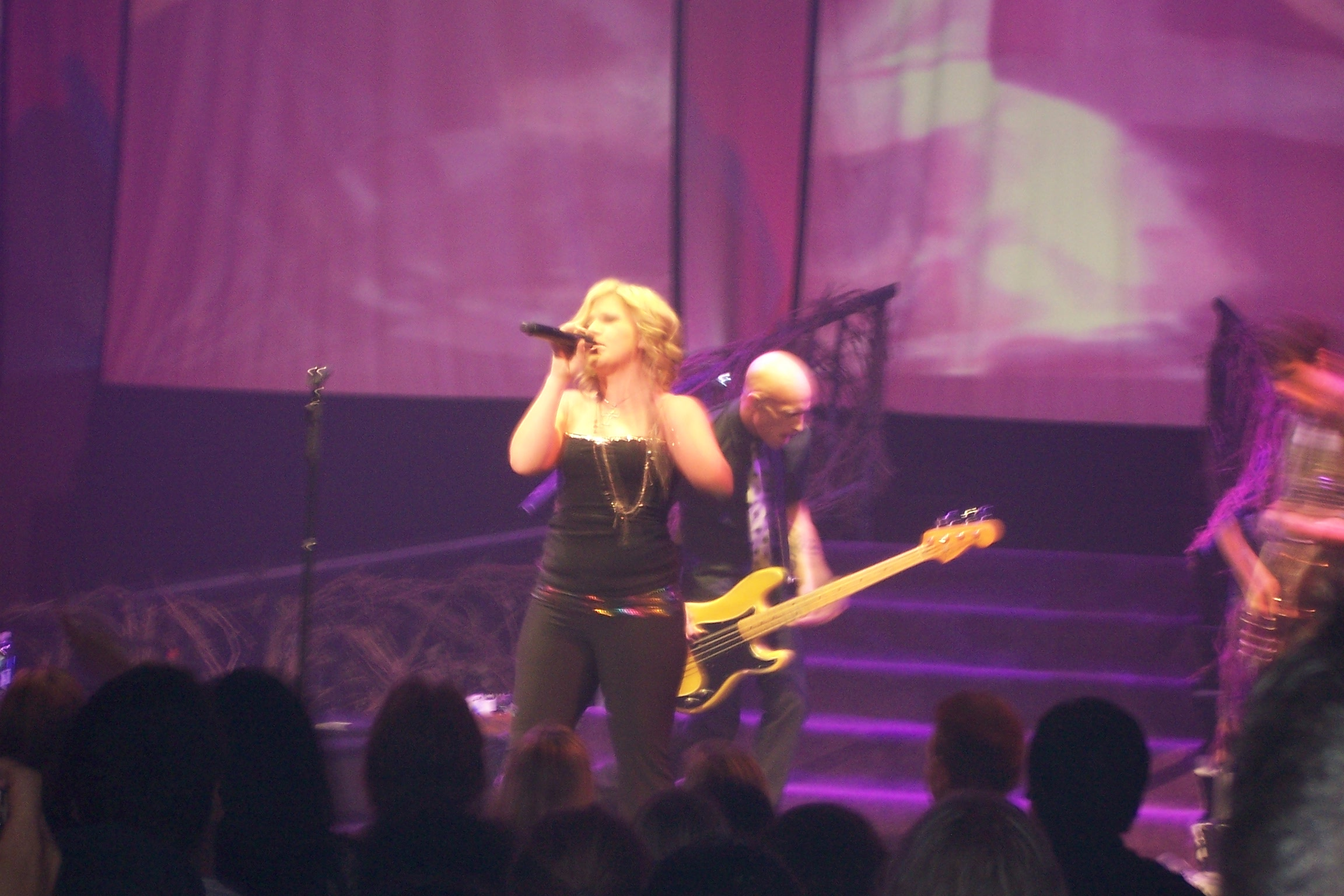
Clarkson and band perform during the early part of the set on October 18, 2007 at the Tower Theater in Upper Darby Township, Pennsylvania.

1. "Untitled I" (contains elements of "Irvine" and "Never Again") (Instrumental Introduction)
2. "One Minute"
3. "Behind These Hazel Eyes"
4. "Don't Waste Your Time"
5. "Never Again"
6. "Maybe"
7. "Gone"
8. "Hole"
9. "Addicted"
10. "Because of You"
11. "Up to the Mountain" (Patty Griffin cover)
12. "Be Still"
13. "Miss Independent"
14. "How I Feel"
15. "Breakaway"
16. "Walk Away"
17. "Sober"
18. "Chivas"
19. "Since U Been Gone"

Notes

- "Beautiful Disaster" was performed during concerts in Europe and Australia.
- During the concert at the Gibson Amphitheatre in Los Angeles, Clarkson performed "Can I Have A Kiss" and "Home". The songs were also included during the show at the Massey Hall in Toronto.
- During the concert at the Ryman Auditorium in Nashville, Clarkson performed "No Bad News".

== Tour dates ==
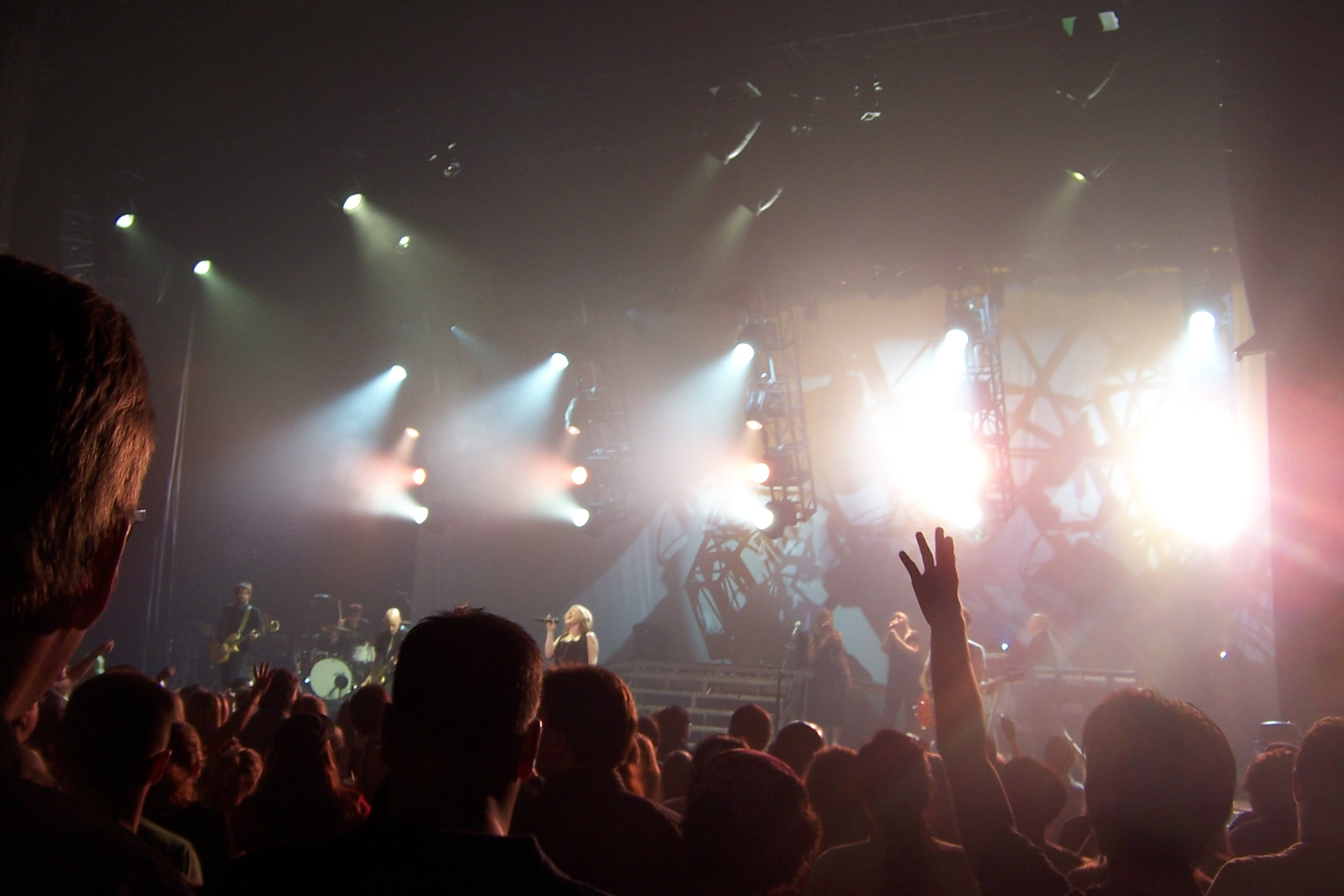
Clarkson and band perform during the later part of the set on October 18, 2007 at the Tower Theater in Upper Darby Township, Pennsylvania.

Date	City	Country	Venue
Australia Leg 1
September 28, 2007	Melbourne	Australia	Palais Theatre
September 30, 2007	Sydney	Australia	The Forum
North America
October 10, 2007	Verona	United States	Turning Stone Event Center
October 12, 2007	Atlantic City	United States	Borgata Event Center
October 14, 2007	New York City	United States	Beacon Theatre
October 15, 2007	New York City	United States	Beacon Theatre
October 16, 2007	New York City	United States	Beacon Theatre
October 18, 2007	Upper Darby Township	United States	Tower Theater
October 21, 2007	Uncasville	United States	Mohegan Sun Arena
October 23, 2007	Boston	United States	Orpheum Theatre
October 24, 2007	Washington, D.C.	United States	DAR Constitution Hall
October 26, 2007	Niagara Falls	United States	Seneca Niagara Events Center
October 28, 2007	Detroit	United States	The Fillmore Detroit
October 30, 2007	Toronto	Canada	Massey Hall
November 1, 2007	Chicago	United States	Chicago Theatre
November 2, 2007	Minneapolis	United States	State Theatre
November 5, 2007	Denver	United States	Paramount Theatre
November 10, 2007	San Jose	United States	Event Center Arena
November 12, 2007	Seattle	United States	Paramount Theatre
November 14, 2007	Sacramento	United States	Sacramento Memorial Auditorium
November 16, 2007	San Diego	United States	San Diego Civic Theatre
November 18, 2007	Los Angeles	United States	Gibson Amphitheatre
November 20, 2007	Tempe	United States	Gammage Memorial Auditorium
November 23, 2007	Grand Prairie	United States	Nokia Live at Grand Prairie
November 25, 2007	Houston	United States	Verizon Wireless Theater
November 27, 2007	Atlanta	United States	Cobb Energy Performing Arts Centre
November 29, 2007	Boca Raton	United States	Count de Hoernle Amphitheater
December 1, 2007	Clearwater	United States	Ruth Eckerd Hall
December 3, 2007	Nashville	United States	Ryman Auditorium
Australia Leg 2
March 1, 2008	Perth	Australia	Challenge Stadium
March 3, 2008	Adelaide	Australia	Adelaide Entertainment Centre
March 4, 2008	Melbourne	Australia	Rod Laver Arena
March 6, 2008	Sydney	Australia	Sydney Entertainment Centre
March 8, 2008	Newcastle	Australia	Newcastle Entertainment Centre
March 9, 2008	Brisbane	Australia	Brisbane Entertainment Centre
Europe
March 14, 2008	Manchester	England	Carling Apollo Manchester
March 17, 2008	Glasgow	Scotland	Carling Academy Glasgow
March 18, 2008	Glasgow	Scotland	Carling Academy Glasgow
March 20, 2008	Wolverhampton	England	Wolverhampton Civic Hall
March 22, 2008	Plymouth	England	Plymouth Pavilions
March 23, 2008	Bournemouth	England	Solent Hall
March 26, 2008	London	England	Hammersmith Apollo
March 27, 2008	London	England	Hammersmith Apollo
March 29, 2008	Cardiff	Wales	Cardiff International Arena
March 31, 2008	Brighton	England	Brighton Centre
April 2, 2008	Mannheim	Germany	Mannheimer Rosengarten
April 3, 2008	Cologne	Germany	Palladium Köln
April 5, 2008	Antwerp	Belgium	Lotto Arena
April 6, 2008	Amsterdam	Netherlands	Heineken Music Hall
April 8, 2008	Manchester	England	Carling Apollo Manchester
April 9, 2008	Copenhagen	Denmark	Vega Musikkens Hus
April 11, 2008	Stockholm	Sweden	Annexet
April 13, 2008	Helsinki	Finland	Helsinki Ice Hall

Cancellations and rescheduled shows; (original tour dates)

July 11, 2007	Portland	Rose Garden Arena	Cancelled
July 13, 2007	Seattle	KeyArena	Cancelled
July 15, 2007	Sacramento	ARCO Arena	Cancelled
July 17, 2007	San Jose	HP Pavilion	Cancelled
July 19, 2007	Anaheim	Honda Center	Cancelled
July 21, 2007	Denver	Pepsi Center	Cancelled
July 22, 2007	Kansas City	Kemper Arena	Cancelled
July 25, 2007	Saint Paul	Xcel Energy Center	Cancelled
July 27, 2007	St. Louis	Scottrade Center	Cancelled
July 29, 2007	Rosemont	Allstate Arena	Cancelled
July 31, 2007	Columbus	Value City Arena	Cancelled
August 2, 2007	Toronto	Air Canada Centre	Cancelled
August 4, 2007	Boston	TD Banknorth Garden	Cancelled
August 5, 2007	Albany	Times Union Center	Cancelled
August 10, 2007	Auburn Hills	The Palace of Auburn Hills	Cancelled
August 12, 2007	Cleveland	Quicken Loans Arena	Cancelled
August 14, 2007	Philadelphia	Wachovia Center	Cancelled
August 16, 2007	Uncasville	Mohegan Sun Wolf Den	Cancelled
August 18, 2007	Uniondale	Nassau Veterans Memorial Coliseum	Cancelled
August 19, 2007	Washington, D.C.	Verizon Center	Cancelled
August 22, 2007	East Rutherford	Continental Airlines Arena	Cancelled
August 24, 2007	East Rutherford	Continental Airlines Arena	Cancelled
August 26, 2007	Nashville	Gaylord Entertainment Center	Cancelled
August 28, 2007	Duluth	Arena at Gwinnett Center	Cancelled
August 30, 2007	Sunrise	BankAtlantic Center	Cancelled
September 1, 2007	Orlando	Amway Arena	Cancelled
September 2, 2007	Tampa	St. Pete Times Forum	Cancelled
September 5, 2007	Dallas	American Airlines Center	Cancelled
September 7, 2007	Houston	Toyota Center	Cancelled
September 9, 2007	Las Vegas	MGM Grand Garden Arena	Rescheduled to September 28, 2007
September 13, 2007	Calgary	Pengrowth Saddledome	Cancelled
September 14, 2007	Edmonton	Rexall Place	Cancelled
September 16, 2007	Vancouver	Pacific Coliseum	Cancelled
September 19, 2007	Fresno	Save Mart Center	Cancelled
September 21, 2007	San Diego	San Diego Sports Arena	Cancelled
September 23, 2007	Phoenix	US Airways Center	Cancelled
September 26, 2007	Los Angeles	Pauley Pavilion	Cancelled
September 28, 2007	Las Vegas	MGM Grand Garden Arena	Cancelled
March 15, 2008	Manchester	O2 Apollo	Rescheduled to April 8, 2008

=== Box office score data ===
Venue	City	Tickets sold / available	Gross revenue
Borgata Events Center	Atlantic City, New Jersey	2,232 / 2,978 (75%)	$115,895
Beacon Theatre	New York City	8,553 / 8,553 (100%)	$364,539
Tower Theater	Upper Darby Township, Pennsylvania	2,882 / 3,064 (94%)	$114,550
The Fillmore Detroit	Detroit	2,599 / 2,900 (90%)	$94,800
Massey Hall	Toronto	2,567 / 2,567 (100%)	$62,837
Chicago Theatre	Chicago	3,413 / 3,413 (100%)	$134,814
State Theatre	Minneapolis	2,049 / 2,049 (100%)	$80,936
Event Center Arena	San Jose, California	4,613 / 4,666 (99%)	$168,525
TOTAL		28,908 / 30,190 (96%)	$1,136,896

== Personnel ==
Band

- Lead vocals: Kelly Clarkson
- Keyboards, Musical director: Jason Halbert
- Guitar: Aben Eubanks
- Guitar, backup vocals: Cory Churko
- Bass: Einar Pedersen
- Drums: Chris Deaner
- Backup vocalist, acoustic guitar: Jill Pickering
- Backup vocalist: Kate Rapier

Other

- Management: Narvel Blackstock & Starstuck Management
- Tour Manager: Tim Krieg
- Production Manager: Allan Hornall
- Hair & Makeup: Ashley Donovan
- Security: Brian Butner & NPB Companies, Inc.
- Booking: CAA
