= My December =

Studio album by Kelly Clarkson
- Released: June 22, 2007
- Recorded: 2006–2007
- Studios: Mower Studios (Pasadena, CA); The Village Recorder (Los Angeles, CA); Clinton Recording Studios (New York, NY); SeeSquared Studios (New York, NY)
- Genres: Alternative rock; hard rock; pop rock
- Length: 46:52
- Labels: RCA; 19
- Producers: David Kahne; Jason Halbert; Jimmy Messer

Kelly Clarkson chronology
Breakaway (2004)	My December (2007)	All I Ever Wanted (2009)

Singles from My December
- 1. "Never Again" Released: April 24, 2007; 2. "Sober" Released: June 12, 2007; 3. "One Minute" Released: September 18, 2007; 4. "Don't Waste Your Time" Released: November 16, 2007

My December is the third studio album by American singer-songwriter Kelly Clarkson. It was released on June 22, 2007, through RCA Records. Produced by David Kahne, the album was largely written and composed by Clarkson, who described the process as "free therapy" inspired by personal struggles. She maintained creative control despite reported conflicts with Sony BMG head Clive Davis, who allegedly sought major changes and a more commercial sound. Clarkson later faced media scrutiny over tour cancellations and label disputes but described the controversy as "blown way out of proportion."

Critics praised My December for Clarkson's bold artistic vision and strong songwriting, with some calling it her most accomplished work, while others acknowledged its ambition but noted uneven execution and a lack of clear hits. The album debuted at number two on the US Billboard 200, selling around 291,000 copies, and was certified platinum by the RIAA. It also achieved high chart positions internationally, including number two in the UK, Canada, and Ireland, and received multiple certifications, though it ultimately sold fewer copies than Clarkson's previous album Breakaway. The album was ranked as the fifth best album of 2007, by the readers of Billboard Magazine.

My December's singles achieved varied commercial success: "Never Again" reached number eight on the Billboard Hot 100, receiving limited radio airplay, and became a top ten success in Australia, Canada, and the United Kingdom. "Sober" underperformed in the United States, and "One Minute" and "Don't Waste Your Time" attained only modest international chart positions. To further promote the album, Clarkson rescheduled her originally planned 37-date My December Tour as a 26-date North American tour from October to December 2007, with Jon McLaughlin serving as the opening act.

== Background ==
=== Development ===
Following the lukewarm reception of her commercially successful debut album Thankful, Clarkson's 2004 album Breakaway established her as a major artist beyond American Idol. It was both a critical and commercial success, earning positive reviews for its new pop rock sound and Clarkson's vocals, winning the Grammy Award for Best Pop Vocal Album, and selling an estimated 12 million copies worldwide. Hits like "Since U Been Gone," "Behind These Hazel Eyes," and "Because of You" became signature songs, shaping 2000s mainstream pop and cementing her as one of Sony BMG's top-selling acts. The album topped charts internationally, remained on the US Billboard 200 for over a year, and was promoted through three global tours, solidifying Clarkson’s status as an independent, globally recognized artist.

Clarkson began writing and composing songs for her next project, My December, during her international The Breakaway Tour, drawing on personal challenges, including the tour's grueling, illness-ridden schedule and a breakup due to her boyfriend's infidelity, which she later described as the "lowest point of my life and my career." During this period, Clarkson wrote approximately 60 songs, a process she described as "free therapy." Her feelings inspired the song "Irvine", which tells of when she was in Irvine, California and cancelled an event to meet fans due to burnout. Although Clarkson felt pressure from her label to duplicate the success of Breakaway, she envisioned a darker, more introspective tone for My December, drawing inspiration from her desire for artistic growth and from singer Alanis Morissette's album Jagged Little Pill. The result was an alternative rock, hard rock and pop rock album, with elements of blues, country, folk, pop, pop-punk, R&B and soul.

=== Conflict with Sony BMG ===
As with Breakaway, Clarkson and Clive Davis, then head of Sony BMG, reportedly clashed over the creative direction of the album. Upon submitting My December in January 2007, Davis allegedly requested major changes to the material and, according to some sources, even considered scrapping the project entirely, expressing concern that the album lacked a guaranteed radio hit—a position subsequently reinforced by market testing. Clarkson, however, resisted pressure to pursue a more mainstream pop sound, refusing to alter the songs and insisting on full creative control, rejecting material she described as "almost insulting" in favor of shaping the record according to her own artistic vision. She stated that her focus was on music, not stardom, saying she had "always just wanted to sing and write." Representatives initially denied reports of tension, with Davis emphasizing that Clarkson was "one of the top four artists at Sony-BMG" and deserved to be treated as such.

The controversy resurfaced when Clarkson canceled her My December tour due to low ticket sales and replaced her manager, Jeff Kwatinetz, with Narvel Blackstock, the former husband of Reba McEntire. Kwatinetz had defended My December to the label, arguing that Clarkson was "burdened with these expectations" to follow her established musical style, while also noting that "she's pushed herself, she's evolved and she's grown." Following the management change, it was reported that Davis offered Clarkson $10 million to remove five songs from the album in favor of more radio-friendly material, including "Black Hole," which later appeared on Lindsay Lohan's album, A Little More Personal (Raw). Clarkson refused the offer, stating that such disagreements "only drives me more. If your thing is to bring me down, cool. I'll just work harder." She also commented on her relationship with Davis, saying, "I'm going to be real honest with you: I am not a fan. I do respect him [Clive Davis], but I don't want to barbecue with him. We don't braid each other's hair. And despite the rumors, he is nowhere near a father figure."

Media reports indicated that the dispute escalated once more when Davis reportedly ignored My December during his appearance on the season finale of sixth installment of American Idol, instead promoting other contestants and praising professional songwriters behind her earlier hits. after Clarkson had refused her label's pressure to perform "Never Again" at the Idol Gives Back charity special, calling it inappropriate for promotion. In the weeks after My December's release, Clarkson sought to smooth tensions, describing the controversy with her label as "blown way out of proportion." She emphasized that she views her band, advisors, and label as a "tightly-knit family" that may disagree at times but ultimately operates on respect and admiration. Clarkson acknowledged Davis as a key advisor and credited him with supporting her career, including releasing the album when he was not obligated to do so. She expressed regret over the way the situation was portrayed in the media and apologized for any misunderstandings.

== Promotion ==
=== Performances ===
The My December Tour, Clarkson’s fourth headlining concert tour, was announced in April 2007 as her first full-scale arena tour in North America, with 37 dates scheduled from July to September 2007. The tour was planned to open in Portland, Oregon, and conclude in Las Vegas, marking a shift to larger venues and featuring a redesigned stage intended to create a more intimate atmosphere, with Mat Kearney serving as the opening act: In June 2007, the tour was cancelled, with promoters citing lower-than-anticipated ticket sales, though Clarkson emphasized that the decision was made in the interest of timing and her long-term career. She later assured fans via her official website that a revised tour would be announced.

Following the cancellation, promotion for the album was limited largely to television appearances and select live performances, most notably her set at the Live Earth concert at Giants Stadium. On September 4, 2007, a revised My December Tour was announced for fall 2007 in North America. The tour comprised 26 dates in 3,000- to 7,500-seat theatres rather than the previously planned arenas, beginning in Verona, New York on October 10, 2007, and concluding in Nashville, Tennessee on December 3, 2007, with Jon McLaughlin opening for Clarkson for the majority, if not all of her North America dates. Clarkson later added Australian and European legs to the tour, scheduled to begin in March 2008 following the first leg of her 2 Worlds 2 Voices Tour with Reba McEntire, with several European dates expanded due to strong advance sales.

=== Singles ===
“Never Again” was released as the lead worldwide single from My December. Clarkson confirmed its release on her official website on April 4, 2007, and premiered the song on Los Angeles’ 102.7 KIIS-FM during On-Air with Ryan Seacrest on April 13, 2007. It was released digitally via the iTunes Store on April 20 and made permanently available on April 24, 2007. The song debuted and peaked at number eight on the US Billboard Hot 100, but unlike Clarkson’s earlier singles, it encountered resistance from radio programmers. Nevertheless, it recorded over 100,000 paid digital downloads in its first week, and had sold more than one million downloads by May 2010.

The album's second single, "Sober", was released to radio on June 6, 2007, merely six weeks after "Never Again" had been serviced to airplay. "Sober" struggled commercially, peaking at number 93 on the Billboard Pop 100 chart—based on mainstream top 40 radio airplay and digital sales—and reaching number 10 on the Bubbling Under Hot 100 Singles chart, marking it as Clarkson's lowest-charting single in the United States to that point. The song's underperformance had significant implications for the album's commercial trajectory, with sales of My December in the US slowing sharply in the wake of its release. Consequently, no additional singles from the album were issued domestically.

"One Minute" managed to gain airplay in Australia, which led the label to officially release it as the second single there and the third single overall. A CD single was released on September 22, 2007. However, it ultimately failed to make a major dent in Australia, debuting at number 36 on Australian Singles Chart before quickly exiting. "Don't Waste Your Time" was issued as the third and final single from My December and the fourth single overall. The song was released digitally in several European territories in fall 2007, followed by a CD single release in Germany in December 2007, and later in Australia in February 2008, reaching number 93 on the German Singles Chart.

== Critical reception ==
Professional ratings
Aggregate scores
Source	Rating
Metacritic	64/100
Review scores
Source	Rating
AllMusic	3/5 stars
About.com	4.5/5 stars
Blender	4/5 stars
Entertainment Weekly	B+
The Guardian	3/5 stars
Rolling Stone	3/5 stars
Slant Magazine	3.5/5 stars
Spin	7/10
Sputnikmusic	1.5/5
Stylus	B

My December garnered fairly positive reviews from music professionals and critics. On Metacritic, the album scored 64/100, indicating generally positive reviews.

Entertainment Weekly critic Chris Willman observed that the album defied expectations following Clarkson's split from Clive Davis, emerging not as a failure but as her "boldest and most artistically accomplished" work, showcasing emotional vulnerability, strong songwriting, and unexpected pop potential despite lacking an obvious hit. Similarly, Slant Magazine awarded the album 3.5 out of 5 stars, noting that, in response to the disappointing performance of "Never Again," "who cares about hits—or appeasing the kids—when the songs are this good?" The Times highlighted Clarkson's ability to "rock without worrying about what anybody else thinks" and praised her skill in finding vitality in mainstream, people-pleasing pop through bold stylistic choices. Michael Endelman of Spin similarly argued that Clarkson asserted artistic credibility through a darker, self-written rock album that, while lacking a clear hit like "Since U Been Gone," remained compelling for its powerful vocals and emotional depth, cementing her as a pop voice for the "overlooked and underappreciated."

More measured assessments acknowledged the album's ambition but noted flaws in execution. Stephen Thomas Erlewine of AllMusic described it as "what Kelly wanted to do, so on that level it's a success," yet added that "for everybody else, My December is a disappointment," recognizing both the artistic necessity of the album and its absence of major crossover hits. Trevor Kelley from The A.V. Club commented that while the album was bold and adventurous, it "often lacked the precise hooks that had made her a star." Caroline Sullivan of The Guardian critiqued the album for relying on "vague lyrics and vocal force rather than directness," with only tracks such as "Never Again" and the waltz-like "Irvine" hinting at greater potential. John Aizlewood of The Evening Standard described Clarkson's creative control as yielding "melody-free, shouty, sub-Alanis Morissette angst," likening the album to being scolded by an especially angry teenager. New York Times editor Kelefa Sanneh wrote that My December was uneven, with much of the album lacking the fun of her earlier hits, and while her darker songs sometimes felt constrained, her voice remained strong. Rob Sheffield of Rolling Stone offered a similarly lukewarm assessment, noting that Clarkson "clobbers you over the head with her emotions and arena-ready choruses," resulting in a record that is "bland in some spots and annoying in others."

== Commercial performance ==
Upon its debut, My December became one of the best-selling albums of the week, surpassing the first-week sales of Clarkson's previous album, Breakaway (2004), which had peaked at number three on the US Billboard 200. The album entered the US chart at number two, selling approximately 291,000 copies — just 6,000 fewer than her debut album Thankful (2003) sold in its first week. It was held from the top spot by Hannah Montana 2: Meet Miley Cyrus, which sold around 326,000 copies that week. On December 12, 2007, My December was certified platinum in the United States by the Recording Industry Association of America (RIAA). It was ranked 66th on the US year-end Billboard 200 albums chart for 2007. By September 2017, while it had not reached the blockbuster heights of Breakaway, the album had sold 858,000 copies in the US.

In the United Kingdom, My December also debuted at number two, selling 40,509 copies in its first week. The album dropped to number nine in its second week and number twenty in its third week. Elsewhere, My December peaked at number two in Canada, Ireland, number four in Australia, five in Germany and Switzerland, seven in the Netherlands, eight in Austria and New Zealand, sixteen in Greece, seventeen in Denmark, and nineteen in Finland. The album received certifications in multiple countries, including platinum in Canada (100,000 units), gold in the UK (156,000 units), Australia (35,000 units), and Ireland (7,500 units),

== Legacy ==
A 2016 review from Sputnikmusic characterized My December as "the most logical progression for Kelly's career"; noting the album's genre-hopping between pop, pop punk, alternative rock, hard rock, soul, R&B, and folk without one genre sounding out of place, and further noting that "it would be really interesting to see if she ever makes an album like My December again". A 2017 article from AXS commemorating the ten-year anniversary of My December stated that the record "was an album Clarkson made for herself and taught her more about not only herself but when to stand up for what she believes in. "It's my face, it's my time," she said of the record. During the feud, other artists jumped to her defense including Daryl Hall of Hall & Oates who also had a conflict with Davis during their run. To date, it still remains a favorite of fans."

Clarkson herself has described the period surrounding the production and release of My December as one of significant personal and professional challenge, marked by creative disagreements, intense public scrutiny, and personal struggles that informed the album's lyrical content. Clive Davis discussed the making of the album, his collaboration with Clarkson, and the subsequent public controversy in detail in his 2013 memoir, Soundtrack of My Life. Clarkson publicly responded to Davis' book, stating that he omitted instances in which he allegedly belittled her and her music, undermining the potential of My December. She emphasized that the album was a personal project she needed to complete and expressed disappointment over the lack of respect she experienced.

== Track listing ==
All songs produced by David Kahne. All songs co-produced by Jason Halbert and Jimmy Messer.

My December – Standard edition
No.	Title	Writer(s)	Length
1.	"Never Again"	Kelly Clarkson; Jimmy Messer	3:37
2.	"One Minute"	Clarkson; Kara DioGuardi; Chantal Kreviazuk; Raine Maida	3:04
3.	"Hole"	Clarkson; Messer; Dwight Baker	3:00
4.	"Sober"	Clarkson; Messer; Aben Eubanks; Calamity McEntire	4:50
5.	"Don't Waste Your Time"	Clarkson; Messer; Malcolm Pardon; Fredrik Rinman	3:35
6.	"Judas"	Clarkson; Messer; Baker	3:36
7.	"Haunted"	Clarkson; Halbert; Messer	3:18
8.	"Be Still"	Clarkson; Eubanks	3:24
9.	"Maybe"	Clarkson; Eubanks; Messer	4:22
10.	"How I Feel"	Clarkson; Messer; Baker	3:40
11.	"Yeah"	Clarkson; Messer; Pardon; Rinmin	2:42
12.	"Can I Have a Kiss"	Clarkson; Messer; Baker	3:29
13.	"Irvine"	Clarkson; Eubanks; Messer	4:15
Total length:			46:52

My December – Japanese edition
No.	Title	Writer(s)	Length
13.	"Irvine"	Clarkson; Eubanks	4:15
14.	"Chivas"	Clarkson; Messer	3:30
15.	"Fading"	Clarkson; Pardon; Rinman	2:52
Total length:			54:14

My December – iTunes Store edition and 2013 digital platform reissue (bonus tracks)
No.	Title	Writer(s)	Length
14.	"Dirty Little Secret"	Clarkson; Messer	3:34
15.	"Never Again" (Dave Audé Radio Remix)	Clarkson; Messer	4:11
16.	"Never Again" (Dave Audé Club Mix)	Clarkson; Messer	7:55
17.	"Not Today"	Clarkson; Messer; Kahne	3:30

== Personnel ==
Vocals

- Kelly Clarkson – all vocals

Musicians

- Rob Brill – additional drum programming
- Aben Eubanks – keyboards (8), programming (8), guitars (8, 9, 13), lap steel guitar (13)
- Jason Halbert – keyboards, programming
- David Kahne – keyboards, programming
- Jimmy Messer – guitars (1–12), bass (9, 11)
- Billy Mohler – bass (1, 2, 4–8, 10, 11, 13)
- Shawn Pelton – drums (1–12)
- David Siskovic – additional beats
- Mike Watt – bass (3, 10, 12)

Orchestra on "Sober" and "Be Still"

- Jeff Carney – double bass
- Cenovia Cummings, Joyce Hammann, Lori Miller, Antoine Silverman, Hiroko Taguchi, Entcho Todorov and Paul Woodiel – violin
- Erik Friedlander, Sara Seiver, Roger Shell and Wendy Sutter – cello
- Aaron Heick – alto saxophone
- Andy Laster – baritone saxophone
- Mick Rossi – orchestrations, arrangements and conductor
- Andrew Sterman – tenor saxophone, conductor

Production

- Chapman Baehler – photography
- Joe Barresi – engineer
- Kelly Clarkson – executive producer
- The Firm, Inc. – management
- Rachel Goodwin – make-up
- Jason Halbert – co-producer
- Jimmy Messer – co-producer, additional engineer
- David Kahne – producer, engineer
- Brett Kilroe – art direction, design
- Jeff Kwatinetz – executive producer
- Bob Ludwig – mastering
- Campbell McAuley – hair stylist
- Vivian Ng – design
- Chris Owens – assistant engineer
- Mike Scielzi – mix assistant
- Jennifer Sousa – A&R, album coordinator
- Emma Trask – wardrobe stylist
- Andy Wallace – mixing

Studios

- Recorded at Mower Studios (Pasadena, California); The Village Recorder (Los Angeles, California); Clinton Recording Studios and SeeSquared Studios (New York City, New York).
- Mixed at Soundtrack Studios (New York City, New York).
- Mastered at Gateway Mastering (Portland, Maine).

== Charts ==
=== Weekly charts ===
Weekly chart performance for My December
Chart (2007)	Peak position
Australian Albums (ARIA)	4
Austrian Albums (Ö3 Austria)	8
Belgian Albums (Ultratop Flanders)	23
Belgian Albums (Ultratop Wallonia)	62
Canadian Albums (Billboard)	2
Danish Albums (Hitlisten)	17
Dutch Albums (Album Top 100)	7
Finnish Albums (Suomen virallinen lista)	19
French Albums (SNEP)	180
German Albums (Offizielle Top 100)	5
Greek Albums (IFPI)	16
Hungarian Albums (MAHASZ)	25
Irish Albums (IRMA)	2
Japanese Albums (Oricon)	42
Mexican Albums (Top 100 Mexico)	27
New Zealand Albums (RMNZ)	8
Scottish Albums (Official Charts)	3
Swedish Albums (Sverigetopplistan)	38
Swiss Albums (Schweizer Hitparade)	5
UK Albums (Official Charts)	2
US Billboard 200	2

=== Year-end charts ===
Year-end chart performance for My December
Chart (2007)	Position
Australian Albums (ARIA)	53
UK Albums (OCC)	129
US Billboard 200	66

== Certifications ==
Certifications and sales for My December
Region	Certification	Certified units/sales
Australia (ARIA)	Gold	35,000^{^}
Canada (Music Canada)	Platinum	100,000^{^}
Ireland (IRMA)	Gold	7,500^{^}
South Korea	—	2,138
United Kingdom (BPI)	Gold	156,000
United States (RIAA)	Platinum	1,000,000^{^}
^{^} Shipments figures based on certification alone.

== Release history ==
Release dates and formats for My December
Region	Date	Format(s)	Label(s)	Ref.
Germany	June 22, 2007	CD	Sony BMG	
Australia	June 23, 2007	CD	Sony BMG	
France	June 25, 2007	CD	Sony BMG	
United Kingdom	June 25, 2007	CD; digital download	RCA	
United States	June 26, 2007	CD; digital download	RCA; 19; S	
Thailand	July 5, 2007	CD	Sony BMG	
Japan	July 25, 2007	CD	BMG Japan	
