= Sober (Kelly Clarkson song) =

Single by Kelly Clarkson

from the album My December
- Released: June 12, 2007
- Genre: Alternative rock
- Length: 4:52
- Label: RCA; 19; S
- Songwriters: Kelly Clarkson; Aben Eubanks; Jimmy Messer; Calamity McEntire
- Producers: David Kahne; Jason Halbert (co); Jimmy Messer (co)

Kelly Clarkson singles chronology
"Because of You" (2007)	"Sober" (2007)	"One Minute" (2007)

Music video
- "Sober" (Live) on YouTube

"Sober" is a song recorded by American singer Kelly Clarkson taken from her third studio album, My December (2007). The song served as the album's second single on June 12, 2007, through 19 Recordings and RCA Records. Clarkson wrote it after her friend Calamity McEntire, who receives a songwriting credit, gave her the line "pick her weeds and keep the flowers", with additional writing by Aben Eubanks and Jimmy Messer, production by David Kahne, and co-production by Messer and Jason Halbert. "Sober" is an alternative rock song, with lyrics that use addiction as a metaphor for a relationship, evolving around the line "Three months and I'm still sober".

Upon its release, "Sober" was met with positive reviews from music critics, who considered it to be the musical highlight of My December. Clarkson's vocal performance and song's production received particular praise. Commercially, "Sober" failed to make an impact, charting at number 93 on Billboard's Pop 100 component chart, based on airplay on mainstream top 40 radio stations and digital downloads, and at number 10 on Bubbling Under Hot 100 Singles. No accompanying music video was recorded for the song; however, Clarkson promoted it through several live appearances, including at Live Earth and The Tonight Show with Jay Leno.

== Writing and composition ==
"Sober"
A 29-second sample features Clarkson singing "Three months and I'm still breathing / Been a long road since those hands I left my tears in" over an alternative rock instrumentation, moments before reaching the song's climax. "Sober" was compared to U2's "With or Without You" (1987).

Clarkson wrote "Sober" after her friend Calamity McEntire gave her the line "pick her weeds and keep the flowers". The singer said the lyrical content is about survival and knowing what to do when something goes wrong. "It's not easy getting over whatever your addiction may be," she says. "The whole point of that song is, the temptation is there, but I'm not going to give in to it." When asked if the lyrics were regarding a drinking problem, Clarkson responded, "I'm not an alcoholic; that's not what it's about. It's just a metaphor. Everyone has something they are addicted to that they can do without in their life, so it could be about whatever your addiction is."

"Sober" is an alternative rock ballad that uses addiction as a metaphor for a relationship, and evolves around the line "Three months and I'm still sober". The song is composed in the key of D major and is set in time signature of common time, with a moderately slow tempo of 120 beats per minute. Clarkson's vocal range spans over an octave, from A_{3} to F♯_{5}. It begins softly, propelled by an acoustic guitar reminiscent of U2's "With or Without You" (1987), and takes "nearly four minutes to reach its climax layering Kelly's desperate vocals over each other", as noted by Talia Kraines of BBC Music. Clarkson deemed "Sober" as her favorite song from My December, and commented that "musically, [the song is] almost hypnotic. You just get lost in it, it's just so beautiful."

== Release and reception ==
Six weeks after "Never Again" had been sent to radio, Roger Friedman of Fox News reported that RCA Records "pulled [the song] from rotations after not catching on." Chuck Taylor of Billboard revealed on June 26, 2007, that "Sober" would be released as the second single from My December, and commented that the song, compared to "Never Again", was "a better bet to propel [Clarkson] back to [radio]." It was officially sent to contemporary hit radio on July 10, 2007, through a promotional CD single including a radio edit and a call-out hook.

=== Critical response ===
"Sober" received positive reviews from music critics, with many considering it as one of the album's highlights. Entertainment Weekly editor Chris Willman considered both "Never Again" and "Sober" to be "moody" and "warm-weather singles." On his review of My December, Josh Love of Stylus Magazine wrote that while album track "'Hole' whips up an almost joyously liberating nihilism that blessedly bypasses goth’s obfuscation, [...] right on its heels there's 'Sober' seething with quiet restraint (at least until the end)." Boston Globe reporter Sarah Rodman thought "Sober" was the album's "centerpiece," praising it as "the set's second best vocal [performance]." Sam Lansky of PopCrush considered "Sober" as Clarkson's 2nd best song, commenting that, even though it had a "dismal" chart performance, the song still is "one of the tracks most beloved by hardcore Clarkson fans." Lansky continued to praise the "riveting vocal performance, heartbreaking lyrics, and haunting production that recedes to the background so [the singer's] incredible voice can shine."

Sal Cinquemani of Slant Magazine said "Sober" is a "slower-burning ballad", while Bill Lamb of About.com considered it one of the top tracks from My December. Two different reviews by staff members of Sputnikmusic praised the song. On the first review, Dave de Sylvia said the song was not radio-friendly, but added that "it is beautifully arranged, taking in bouncy Sting-like synthesised strings and an excellent vocal performance." On the second review, Channing Freeman wrote that "Sober" is "one of the few tracks [on the album] where Clarkson gets away with her vocal restraint, mainly because at the end she lets loose and gives one of the best performances of her career, making the two or so minutes of waiting worthwhile." Chuck Taylor of Billboard praised "Sober" as a single that would "reintoxicate [Clarkson's] deserved stance as a staple act".

=== Chart performance ===
The song failed to make impact, charting at number 93 on Billboard's Pop 100 component chart, based on airplay on mainstream top 40 radio stations and digital downloads. Additionally, it peaked at number 10 on Bubbling Under Hot 100 Singles. As of February 11, 2010, "Sober" has sold 113,000 copies in the United States, according to Nielsen Soundscan.

== Live performances and usage in media ==
On July 7, 2007, Clarkson performed "Sober" during her set at the New York area concert of Live Earth. It was the one Clarkson performance selected for a Warner Bros. CD/DVD release from the Live Earth concerts. She performed the song during a special titled Nissan Live Sets on Yahoo! Music, on The Early Show, Sessions@AOL, Take 40's Live Lounge, and on The Tonight Show with Jay Leno. On October 19, 2011, while promoting her fifth studio album Stronger at nightclub The Troubadour, Clarkson performed "Sober" after it was requested by the fans. Jason Scott of Billboard opined that "Clarkson certainly doesn't "crash and burn," so to speak; instead, she rips into the track until there's nothing left but lyric and heart." The performance was listed as one of Clarkson's ten "most powerful and undeniable performances" as compiled by Billboard in 2016. On October 10, 2013, the singer performed the song during a special Fair Trade concert for Green Mountain Coffee Roasters. Clarkson included "Sober" on the set list of the album's supporting concert tour, titled My December Tour (2008). She also performed the song as a fan request during her co-headlining concert tour with The Fray, titled 2012 Summer Tour, on July 22, 2012. "Sober" was featured on the hit television show Smallville on the episode "Bizarro", which is the opener for Season 7.

== Formats and track listings ==
- Album version
4. "Sober" – 4:52
- Promotional CD single
1. "Sober" (radio edit) – 3:48
2. "Sober" (call-out hook) – 0:10

== Charts ==
Chart (2007)	Peak position
US Bubbling Under Hot 100 Singles (Billboard)	10
US Pop 100 (Billboard)	93

== Release history ==
Country	Date	Format	Label
United States	June 12, 2007	Contemporary hit radio	RCA Records
