= Now That's What I Call Country =

Compilation album by Various artists
- Released: August 26, 2008
- Recorded: Various times
- Genre: Country
- Length: 78:15
- Label: UMG

Series chronology
Now That's What I Call Classic Rock (2008)	Now That's What I Call Country (2008)	The Essential Now That's What I Call Christmas (2008)

Country series chronology
Now That's What I Call Country (2008)	Now That's What I Call Country Volume 2 (2009)

Professional ratings
Review scores
Source	Rating
Allmusic	2.5/5 stars

Now That's What I Call Country is a country music compilation album released on August 26, 2008. The album is the first in the (U.S.) Now! series to be composed exclusively of country music tracks. All of the tracks peaked inside the top 20 of the Billboard Hot Country Songs chart, 16 of which were top 5 hits with 5 of those reaching number one.

The album debuted at number 1 on the Billboard Top Country Albums chart and peaked at number 7 on the Billboard 200 in September 2008.

== Track listing ==
No.	Title	Artist	Length
1.	"All-American Girl"	Carrie Underwood	3:33
2.	"Winner at a Losing Game"	Rascal Flatts	4:46
3.	"Watching Airplanes"	Gary Allan	4:02
4.	"Because of You"	Reba McEntire with Kelly Clarkson	3:43
5.	"Everybody"	Keith Urban	5:33
6.	"Stay"	Sugarland	4:44
7.	"Love Don't Live Here"	Lady A	3:50
8.	"Picture to Burn"	Taylor Swift	2:53
9.	"Trying to Stop Your Leaving"	Dierks Bentley	3:38
10.	"All My Friends Say"	Luke Bryan	4:02
11.	"Letter to Me"	Brad Paisley	4:41
12.	"I Saw God Today"	George Strait	3:23
13.	"That Song in My Head"	Julianne Hough	3:13
14.	"As If"	Sara Evans	3:30
15.	"Don't Blink"	Kenny Chesney	4:46
16.	"You're Gonna Miss This"	Trace Adkins	3:44
17.	"What Kinda Gone"	Chris Cagle	3:01
18.	"Things That Never Cross a Man's Mind"	Kellie Pickler	3:09
19.	"Another Try"	Josh Turner with Trisha Yearwood	3:45
20.	"Alyssa Lies"	Jason Michael Carroll	4:19

=== Free downloads ===
The Now That's What I Call Country CD can also unlock free downloads for the following tracks:

1. Eric Church – "Carolina"
2. Jamey Johnson – "High Cost of Living"
3. The Lost Trailers – "Hey Baby"
4. Ashton Shepherd – "Ain't Dead Yet"
5. Emily West – "Annie's Gonna Get a Brand New Gun"
6. Chuck Wicks – "Man of the House"

== Chart performance ==
=== Weekly charts ===
Chart (2008)	Peak position
US Billboard 200	7
US Top Country Albums (Billboard)	1

=== Year-end charts ===
Chart (2008)	Position
US Top Country Albums (Billboard)	35
Chart (2009)	Position
US Top Country Albums (Billboard)	34

== Certifications ==
Region	Certification
United States (RIAA)	Gold
