= Now That's What I Call Music! 27 =

Now That's What I Call Music! 27 refers to multiple different Now That's What I Call Music! series albums.

- Now That's What I Call Music! 27 (UK series), released in 1994
- Now That's What I Call Music! 27 (U.S. series), released on March 11, 2008
- Now! 27 (Canadian series), released on September 23, 2016
