= One Minute =

2007 single by Kelly Clarkson

Single by Kelly Clarkson

from the album My December
- B-side: "Never Again"
- Released: September 18, 2007
- Genre: Alternative rock
- Length: 3:05
- Label: RCA; 19; S
- Songwriters: Kelly Clarkson; Kara DioGuardi; Chantal Kreviazuk; Raine Maida
- Producer: David Kahne

Kelly Clarkson singles chronology
"Sober" (2007)	"One Minute" (2007)	"Don't Waste Your Time" (2007)

"One Minute" is a song recorded by American singer Kelly Clarkson taken from her third studio album, My December (2007). The song served as the album's second single (third overall) in Australia on September 18, 2007, through 19 Recordings and RCA Records. Clarkson originally wrote it for her second studio album, Breakaway (2004), with songwriters Kara DioGuardi, Chantal Kreviazuk and Raine Maida; however, it did not make the final track listing. It was then reworked for My December, being produced by David Kahne, and co-produced by Jason Halbert and Jimmy Messer. "One Minute" is an alternative rock song with electropop influences, and consists of "rapid-fire give-and-take verses".

Upon its release, "One Minute" was met with positive reviews from music critics, with one considering it to be the musical highlight of My December, along with "Never Again" and "Don't Waste Your Time". Following strong radio airplay, the song debuted at number 41 in Australia, reaching its peak of number 36 a week later. No accompanying music video was recorded for the song; however, Clarkson promoted it through few live appearances, including at Daytona 500 in February 2007, and on Take 40's Live Lounge.

== Release and composition ==
"One Minute"
A 19-second sample features Clarkson singing "rapid-fire give-and-take verses" over an alternative rock instrumentation, influenced by electropop. Critics compared it to pop rock songs by Ashlee Simpson, Garbage and Lindsay Lohan.

In 2004, Clarkson teamed up with songwriters Kara DioGuardi and Chantal Kreviazuk to work on songs for her second studio album, Breakaway (2004). Together they wrote "Where Is Your Heart", while musician Raine Maida, Kreviazuk's husband, co-wrote "Walk Away" and "One Minute" with the trio. However, only the first two songs were included on the album. "One Minute" was then reworked for My December, being produced by David Kahne, and co-produced by Jason Halbert and Jimmy Messer. After receiving strong radio airplay in Australia, it was released as the second single from the album in the country, on September 18, 2007, through 19 Recordings and RCA Records.

"One Minute" is an alternative rock song with electropop influences, and begins with Clarkson singing, "You're going crazy, running on empty / You can't make up your mind / You try to hide it, but you had to say it / Restless all this time." It is composed in the key of A major and is set in time signature of common time, with a tempo of 124 beats per minute. Clarkson's vocal range spans over an octave, from A_{3} to D_{5}. Critics have observed the influence of 1980s music on the song, while Talia Kraines of BBC Music compared it to pop rock songs released by singers Ashlee Simpson and Lindsay Lohan. A reviewer for Billboard commented on the song's structure, writing that "One Minute" consists of "rapid-fire give-and-take verses".

== Critical response ==
"One Minute" received generally positive reviews from music critics. On his review for My December, Josh Love of Stylus Magazine wrote that the song, along with "Don't Waste Your Time", "as lyrically sour as they may be, [...] are both fantastically layered pop-rockers." Chris Willman of Entertainment Weekly considered the album to be Clarkson's "darker, more personal, riskier" release until that point. Willman added that "One Minute" was a "lighter [pleasure] that (take note, Team Clive!) would make [a] dandy warm-weather [single]." Michael Endelman of Spin considered it a "snarling disco rock" song, while Nick Levine of Digital Spy deemed it "pounding [and] insistent". Penn Live blogger Ashley Z. said that "the anger on this record can be overwhelming at times," which could be an argument for the "existence" of "One Minute". Allmusic long-time contributor Stephen Thomas Erlewine considered it the highlight of My December, along with "Never Again" and "Irvine", writing that the song "give this album some much needed spark."

== Live performances ==
Clarkson first performed "One Minute" at Daytona 500 on February 18, 2007, where she premiered the song prior to the album's release. Later that year, she performed the song during a special titled Nissan Live Sets on Yahoo! Music, and on Take 40's Live Lounge. The latter was released as a promotional live video in Australia, as no accompanying music video for the single was filmed. "One Minute" was included on the set list of the album's supporting concert tour, the My December Tour (2007–08).

== Formats and track listings ==
- CD single
1. "One Minute" – 3:05
2. "Never Again" (live at AOL Sessions) – 3:40
- Digital download
1. "One Minute" – 3:05
2. "Never Again" – 3:40

== Charts ==
On the week of October 7, 2007, "One Minute" debuted at number 41 in Australia, following strong radio airplay. The following week, it peaked at number 36, before falling out of the top 50 two weeks later.

Chart (2007)	Peak position
Australia (ARIA)	36

== Release history ==
Country	Date	Format	Label
Australia	September 18, 2007	Digital download	19 Recordings
Australia	September 22, 2007	CD single	19 Recordings
Russia	October 30, 2007	Contemporary hit radio	19 Recordings
