= Now That's What I Call Christmas! 4 =

Compilation album by Various artists
- Released: October 12, 2010
- Genre: Christmas music
- Length: CD 1: 61:21; CD 2: 53:02
- Label: EMI/Sony Music/Universal Music

Now That's What I Call Music! Christmas chronology
Now That's What I Call a Country Christmas (2009)	Now That's What I Call Christmas! 4 (2010)	Now That's What I Call Today's Christmas! (2012)

Christmas series chronology
Now That's What I Call a Country Christmas (2009)	Now That's What I Call Christmas! 4 (2010)

Professional ratings
Review scores
Source	Rating
AllMusic	3/5 stars

Now That's What I Call Christmas! 4 is a 2010 double album from the Now That's What I Call Music! series in the United States. It was released on October 12, 2010, and peaked at No. 28 on the Billboard 200. It was re-released in 2011 as a Special Caroling Edition, which featured an expanded booklet that contained lyrics to many of the songs featured on the album. The album has sold 440,000 copies as of January 2013.

== Track list ==
=== Disc one ===
No.	Title	Artist	Length
1.	"A Child is Born"	Rihanna	3:54
2.	"Merry Christmas Baby"	Sheryl Crow	3:15
3.	"Mistletoe"	Colbie Caillat	3:53
4.	"All I Want for Christmas is You"	Mariah Carey	4:02
5.	"Have Yourself a Merry Little Christmas"	Christina Aguilera	4:05
6.	"What Child is This?"	Carrie Underwood	3:27
7.	"Where Are You Christmas?"	Faith Hill	4:07
8.	"Silver Bells"	Martina McBride	2:43
9.	"Rockin' Around the Christmas Tree"	Toby Keith	2:23
10.	"Candy Cane Christmas"	Darius Rucker	3:23
11.	"Christmas You and Me"	Brian McKnight featuring Vince Gill	4:08
12.	"Wonderful Christmastime"	Kelly Rowland	3:40
13.	"Little Drummer Boy"	Sean Kingston	2:28
14.	"Christmas Tree"	Lady Gaga featuring Space Cowboy	2:22
15.	"My Only Wish (This Year)"	Britney Spears	4:16
16.	"Let It Snow, Let It Snow, Let It Snow"	Michael Bublé	2:04
17.	"Christmas Time Is Here"	Diana Krall	3:34
18.	"Happy Christmas (War Is Over)"	Maroon 5	3:28

=== Disc two ===
No.	Title	Artist	Length
1.	"The Christmas Song (Merry Christmas to You)"	Nat King Cole	3:12
2.	"White Christmas"	Bing Crosby	3:04
3.	"Here Comes Santa Claus"	Elvis Presley	1:56
4.	"It's Beginning to Look a Lot Like Christmas"	Johnny Mathis	2:17
5.	"It's the Most Wonderful Time of the Year"	Andy Williams	2:33
6.	"A Marshmallow World"	Dean Martin	2:41
7.	"A Holly Jolly Christmas (Single)"	Burl Ives	2:15
8.	"Jingle Bell Rock"	Bobby Helms	2:12
9.	"Rudolph the Red-Nosed Reindeer"	The Temptations	2:58
10.	"Little Saint Nick"	The Beach Boys	2:09
11.	"The Chipmunk Song (Christmas Don't Be Late)"	Alvin and the Chipmunks	2:21
12.	"Peace on Earth/Little Drummer Boy"	Bing Crosby and David Bowie	2:39
13.	"Jingle Bells"	James Taylor	3:54
14.	"Christmas at Sea"	Sting	4:38
15.	"O Come All Ye Faithful"	Celtic Woman	3:51
16.	"December"	Norah Jones	3:06
17.	"Do They Know It's Christmas?"	Band Aid	3:41
18.	"Deck the Halls"	Mannheim Steamroller	3:27

== Special Caroling Edition ==
On September 27, 2011, Now That's What I Call Christmas! 4: Special Caroling Edition was released, with this version coming with printed lyrics to the songs.

== Charts ==
=== Weekly charts ===
Chart (2010)	Peak position
US Billboard 200	28
US Top Holiday Albums (Billboard)	4

=== Year-end charts ===
Chart (2011)	Position
US Billboard 200	140
