= Don't Waste Your Time (Kelly Clarkson song) =

Single by Kelly Clarkson

from the album My December
- B-side: "Fading"
- Released: November 16, 2007
- Studio: The Village Recorder (Los Angeles, CA)
- Genre: Pop rock
- Length: 3:35
- Label: RCA
- Songwriters: Kelly Clarkson; Jimmy Messer; Malcolm Pardon; Fredrik Rinman
- Producer: David Kahne

Kelly Clarkson singles chronology
| "One Minute" (2007) | "Don't Waste Your Time" (2007) | "My Life Would Suck Without You" (2009) |

Music video
- "Don't Waste Your Time" on YouTube

"Don't Waste Your Time" is a song by American pop rock singer-songwriter Kelly Clarkson. It was written by Clarkson, Jimmy Messer, Malcolm Pardon, and Fredrik Rinman, sampling riffs from Ira Losco's "Uh Oh". It is the second and final European single from Clarkson's third studio album, My December, released in several European countries via iTunes on November 16, 2007. It was released as a CD single in Germany on December 14, 2007. In Australia, it was promoted as the album's third single in February 2008, in time for the Australian leg of the My December Tour.

== Single release ==
On July 27, 2007, Sony BMG UK exclusively revealed "Don't Waste Your Time" as the second single from My December to be released in the United Kingdom. It was never released in the UK, but was played on UK music television channels. Clarkson herself confirmed its release in Canada during her appearance in Canada's MTV Live on August 20, 2007. The release was eventually cancelled.

On August 23, 2007, Mizz Magazine confirmed that "Don't Waste Your Time" was going to be released in September 2007. However it was later postponed to November 2007 due to the music video not being ready for release. Nearing the date of October 29, 2007, "Don't Waste Your Time" was placed onto the "Coming Soon" list implying that the single will be released at a later time in the United Kingdom. The UK release of the single was scrapped and it was never released in the United States.

== Critical reception ==
About.com editor Bill Lamb wrote that this songs "poppy" chorus of "Don't Waste Your Time" will have listeners signing along in no time. Rolling Stone editor Rob Sheffield wrote that her voice sags this song, which according to him, has the best line of the whole album: "Friend? What does that even mean?" Sputnik editor Dave Donnely wrote that ‘Don’t Waste Your Time’ boasts catchy hooks, but according to him "the verses are stagnant, bogged down by a rigid rhyming scheme which prevents the singer from injecting any fluidity into her performance." Stylus Magazine editor Josh Love wrote: "As lyrically sour as it may be, “Don’t Waste Your Time” is a fantastically layered pop-rocker."

== Music video ==
On August 20, 2007, Clarkson made an appearance on Canada's MTV Live before performing on Canadian Idol on August 21, 2007. During her appearance, she confirmed her plans on shooting the music video for the song in a couple of days. Clarkson added that her idea for the music video and it will be kind of a "rocker fairytale". In an interview, Clarkson said that in the video, she has dark colored hair.

A sneak peek of the video appeared on September 25, 2007 on Clarkson's official site. In the video you can see Clarkson and others filming the video and talking about the technical special effects. The video, which was directed by Roman White, is to take place in a castle, where Clarkson is trapped and a prince is trying to get in. The video premiered via internet on White's official website on October 5, 2007. The castle in the video is a digital copy of a Hungarian–Transylvanian Castle of Huniazilor/Corvineştilor (Hunyad Castle), located on Hunedoara, Romania.

The video itself features Clarkson with long, dark hair asleep on a large gothic bed covered in vines, as if to be a darker version of Sleeping Beauty, waiting for a prince to awaken her with a kiss. However, when the "prince" finally does arrive at the surreal castle, he finds that the vines are growing out of control, engulfing the building and keeping him out. He snaps vines and crawls around them to try to get to Clarkson. Throughout, Clarkson is seen in a blood red dress undoubtedly based on the album's cover, demanding that he not waste his time. The video ends with the prince finally reaching the bed on which Clarkson lies asleep, but it is nearly invisible due to the black vines growing around it. As he passes by, looking intently for her, the vines seal up the last hole through which the bed could be seen, and he walks past oblivious.

Blender praised the music video, writing that it is not so different from her previous ones.

== Track listings and other formats ==
German maxi single (88697 195192)

1. "Don't Waste Your Time" – 3:35
2. "Fading" – 2:51
3. "Maybe" [Sessions at AOL] – 4:24
4. "Don't Waste Your Time" [Music Video] – 3:35

German CD single (88697 170342)

1. "Don't Waste Your Time" – 3:35
2. "Fading" – 2:51

Australian iTunes edition

1. "Don't Waste Your Time"

== Charts ==
| Chart (2007–08) | Peak position |
|---|---|
| Germany (GfK) | 93 |
| Slovakia Airplay (ČNS IFPI) | 94 |

== Release history ==
| Region | Date | Label | Format | Catalog |
|---|---|---|---|---|
| Portugal | November 16, 2007 | Sony BMG | Digital download | |
| France | November 16, 2007 | Sony BMG | Digital download | |
| Finland | November 16, 2007 | Sony BMG | Digital download | |
| Denmark | November 16, 2007 | Sony BMG | Digital download | |
| Austria | November 16, 2007 | Sony BMG | Digital download | |
| Ireland | November 16, 2007 | Sony BMG | Digital download | |
| Greece | November 16, 2007 | Sony BMG | Digital download | |
| Italy | November 16, 2007 | Sony BMG | Digital download | |
| Norway | November 16, 2007 | Sony BMG | Digital download | |
| Portugal | November 16, 2007 | Sony BMG | Digital download | |
| Spain | November 16, 2007 | Sony BMG | Digital download | |
| Taiwan | November 25, 2007 | Sony BMG Music Entertainment | Digital download | — |
| Germany | December 14, 2007 | SonyBMG | CD | 88697-170342 (Basic) / 88697-195192 (Premium) |
| Australia | February 2, 2008 | SonyBMG | Digital download | |
