= Now That's What I Call a Country Christmas =

Compilation album by Various artists
- Released: October 6, 2009
- Genres: Christmas music, country
- Length: CD 1: 47:02; CD 2: 48:21
- Label: Legacy

Full series chronology
Now That's What I Call Club Hits (2009)	Now That's What I Call a Country Christmas (2009)	Now That's What I Call Music! 32 (2009)

Christmas series chronology
The Essential Now That's What I Call Christmas (2008)	Now That's What I Call a Country Christmas (2009)	Now That's What I Call Christmas! 4 (2010)

Professional ratings
Review scores
Source	Rating
Allmusic	3.5/5 stars

Now That's What I Call a Country Christmas is a compilation album released on October 6, 2009, as part of the (US) Now That's What I Call Music! series.

The album is the fifth Christmas-themed album in the series, but the first containing versions performed by country music artists, both contemporary and older artists.

== Track listing ==
=== Disc one ===
No.	Title	Artist	Length
1.	"Winter Wonderland"	Darius Rucker	2:36
2.	"Away in a Manger"	Brad Paisley	4:44
3.	"Have Yourself a Merry Little Christmas"	Julianne Hough	3:49
4.	"Joy to the World"	George Strait	2:28
5.	"Baby, It's Cold Outside"	Lady Antebellum	3:30
6.	"I'll Be Home for Christmas"	Brooks & Dunn	2:37
7.	"Run Run Rudolph"	Luke Bryan	2:52
8.	"The First Noel"	Josh Turner	4:21
9.	"Santa Baby"	Kellie Pickler	3:25
10.	"It's Christmas"	Trace Adkins	3:16
11.	"Go Tell It on the Mountain"	Little Big Town	3:46
12.	"The Man with the Bag"	Lee Ann Womack	2:28
13.	"Christmases When You Were Mine"	Taylor Swift	3:02
14.	"Silver Bells"	Kenny Chesney	4:03

=== Disc two ===
No.	Title	Artist	Length
1.	"Rudolph the Red-Nosed Reindeer"	Gene Autry	3:06
2.	"Blue Christmas"	Elvis Presley with Martina McBride	2:27
3.	"Jingle Bells"	Merle Haggard	2:19
4.	"O Little Town of Bethlehem"	Vince Gill	4:05
5.	"Shimmy Down the Chimney (Fill Up My Stocking)"	Alison Krauss	4:20
6.	"Up on the Housetop"	Reba McEntire	2:04
7.	"O Holy Night"	Glen Campbell	3:53
8.	"What Child Is This?"	Tanya Tucker	4:03
9.	"Christmas in Dixie"	Alabama	3:37
10.	"Rockin' Around the Christmas Tree"	Brenda Lee	2:03
11.	"Kentucky Homemade Christmas"	Kenny Rogers	4:11
12.	"Hard Candy Christmas"	Dolly Parton	3:35
13.	"A Christmas to Remember"	Amy Grant	4:21
14.	"Silent Night"	Johnny Cash	2:01
15.	"A Holly Jolly Christmas"	Burl Ives	2:14

== Charts ==
Chart (2009)	Peak position
Billboard 200	57
Billboard Top Country Albums	11
