= Be Still (Kelly Clarkson song) =

2007 song by Kelly Clarkson

Song by Kelly Clarkson

from the album My December
- Recorded: 2006
- Studio: Mower Studios (Pasadena, California), Village Recorders (Santa Monica, California), SeeSquaredStudios (New York City), and Clinton Studios (New York City)
- Genre: Folk blues
- Length: 3:19
- Label: RCA
- Songwriter(s): Kelly Clarkson; Aben Eubanks
- Producer(s): David Kahne

"Be Still" is a song by American recording artist Kelly Clarkson, from her third studio album, My December (2007). Written by Clarkson and her guitarist Aben Eubanks, and produced by David Kahne, "Be Still" is an acoustic folk blues ballad set moderately slow acoustic and electric guitars. Clarkson wrote the song as an introspective ballad based on her exhaustive experience from touring and promoting her second studio album, Breakaway (2004). Inspired by one of her favorite Bible verses, Psalm 46:10 ("Be still, and know that I am God"), the song is about taking a break from everyday things and taking a moment to appreciate one's life.

"Be Still" has received positive critical reception from music critics, who praised it as one of the album's highlights. Clarkson has included the song in the set list of her My December Tour (2007–08) and 2 Worlds 2 Voices Tour (2008).

== Background ==
Due to the pressure from the music executives and heavy work schedule, Clarkson began to have erratic experiences while performing in her Breakaway World Tour. She recalled,

"Everything caught up with me in a bad way. My body was wearing down, and my emotions were wearing down. I was trying to get over someone. I hadn't seen my friends and family for a while, and it was becoming a nuisance [to see them] because I was so busy. I was traveling, and then there was more added to the schedule. It just got chaotic. I was 24, and that is pretty young to be the boss of so much. And it caught up with me. I couldn't smile. I couldn't do anything. I broke down. I cried so much I couldn't speak. I was that tired. I was drained. I didn't want to act, didn't want to smile -- I didn't want to pretend. I just broke. ... It was the lowest point of my life and my career."

During this period of time, She began to write tracks with her band members for a potential studio album, calling it "free therapy". One of these songs, "Be Still", was co-written with her guitarist Aben Eubanks, and was included in her third studio album, My December, which was ultimately released in 2007.

== Composition ==
Written in the key of D major, "Be Still" is a folk blues ballad. Clarkson's vocal range in the song spans from D_{4} to B_{4}. In this song she tells a lover to just be still and enjoy the moment. The song is named after one of her favorite Bible verses: Psalm 46:10 ("Be still, and know that I am God"). Clarkson explained, "It's all about stopping things, slowing down to appreciate life. Everything just goes so fast, especially in this business. There's just no time to be alone for a moment of quiet. That's why I don't live in Los Angeles and have always lived in Texas. It's about getting away from the rat race and carving out a space for yourself." She compared the song to tracks recorded by Sarah McLachlan, Norah Jones and Bonnie Raitt, and Christine McVie.

== Critical response ==
"Be Still" has received generally positive reviews from music critics. Bill Lamb of About.com praised it as "one of the most gorgeous ballads Kelly Clarkson has yet recorded." Matt Richenthal of TV Fanatic described it as "a gentle, almost jazzy lullaby whose lyrical phrasing echoes Edie Brickell, of all people." Sean Paul Mahoney of Blogcritics described it as "heart-wrenching". Gil Kaufman of MTV wrote in his review, "The spare ballad "Be Still" is about getting a new start. Over a trip hop beat, subtle acoustic guitars and some glitchy-sounding electronics, a wounded Clarkson sensuously croons about being strong and picking yourself up when you fall down." Chuck Taylor of Billboard remarked that "Be Still" "offers acoustic relief from the onslaught more than halfway through the (My December) set." Spence D. of IGN referred to it as a "standard issue balladry", adding: "acoustic guitars and Clarkson's mellifluous vocals lilting with a sense of melancholic serenity." But also became critical about the song's transition from "Haunted". He remarked, "The fact that she continues to smash an angry number right next to a quiet one is a transitional mistake that creates a somewhat jarring sensibility." Roger Friedman of Fox News wrote that "Be Still" "is an effective ballad. But the lyrics deteriorate pretty quickly into an accusatory tone that permeates the album."

== Credits and personnel ==
Credits adapted from My December liner notes.

Personnel

- Songwriting, vocals – Kelly Clarkson
- Bass, guitars – Aben Eubanks, Jimmy Messer
- Bass guitar – Billy Mohler
- Drums – Shawn Pelton
- Keys – Aben Eubanks, Jason Halbert, David Kahne
- Violin – Antoine Silverman, Joyce Hammann, Entcho Todorov, Hiroko Taguchi, Paul Woodiel, Lori Miller, Cenovia Cummings
- Celli – Roger Shell, Wendy Sutter, Erik Friedlander, Sara Seiver
- Double bass – Jeff Carney
- Songwriting - Aben Eubanks
- Alto saxophone – Aaron Heick
- Tenor saxophone, conductor – Andrew Sterman
- Barritone saxophone – Andy Laster
- Production – David Kahne
- Recording – Kelly Clarkson, Aben Eubanks
