= Now That's What I Call Party Hits! (American series) =

2007 compilation album by NOW That's What I Call Music!

Compilation album by Various artists
- Released: November 13, 2007
- Length: 73:41
- Label: Capitol

Series chronology
| Now That's What I Call Music! Vol. 26 (2007) | Now That's What I Call Party Hits! (2007) | Now That's What I Call Music! Vol. 27 (2008) |

Professional ratings
Review scores
| Source | Rating |
|---|---|
| AllMusic | 3/5 stars |
| Robert Christgau | A− |

Now That's What I Call Party Hits! is a compilation album released on November 13, 2007. The album included hits spanning several years, from Kylie Minogue's "Can't Get You Out of My Head" to "Party Like a Rockstar" by the Shop Boyz. It was certified Gold by the RIAA in March 2008.

== Track listing ==
| No. | Title | Artist | Length |
|---|---|---|---|
| 1. | "Party Like a Rockstar" | Shop Boyz | 4:08 |
| 2. | "This Is Why I'm Hot" | Mims | 4:14 |
| 3. | "Run It!" | Chris Brown | 3:12 |
| 4. | "Gold Digger" | Kanye West featuring Jamie Foxx | 3:27 |
| 5. | "Right Thurr" | Chingy | 3:34 |
| 6. | "I Think They Like Me (Remix)" | Dem Franchize Boyz featuring Jermaine Dupri, Da Brat & Bow Wow | 4:39 |
| 7. | "Do It to It" | Cherish featuring Sean Paul of Young Bloodz | 3:39 |
| 8. | "Milkshake" | Kelis | 3:02 |
| 9. | "1 Thing" | Amerie | 3:52 |
| 10. | "Don't Cha" | Pussycat Dolls featuring Busta Rhymes | 3:35 |
| 11. | "Promiscuous" | Nelly Furtado featuring Timbaland | 3:40 |
| 12. | "We Be Burnin'" | Sean Paul | 3:31 |
| 13. | "SOS" | Rihanna | 3:58 |
| 14. | "Get Ur Freak On" | Missy Elliott | 3:29 |
| 15. | "Ain't No Other Man" | Christina Aguilera | 3:45 |
| 16. | "Hey Ya!" | Outkast | 3:50 |
| 17. | "Feel Good Inc." | Gorillaz | 3:26 |
| 18. | "Since U Been Gone" | Kelly Clarkson | 3:06 |
| 19. | "Girlfriend" | Avril Lavigne | 3:35 |
| 20. | "Can't Get You Out of My Head" | Kylie Minogue | 3:49 |

== See also ==
- Now That's What I Call Club Hits
