= Now That's What I Call Club Hits =

Compilation album by Various artists
- Released: September 22, 2009
- Genre: Dance, electronic dance, pop
- Length: 73:32
- Label: Sony Legacy

Series chronology
Now That's What I Call Country Volume 2 (2009)	Now That's What I Call Club Hits (2009)	Now That's What I Call a Country Christmas (2009)

Professional ratings
Review scores
Source	Rating
Allmusic	2.5/5 stars

Now That's What I Call Club Hits is a compilation album released on September 22, 2009. This is the first album in the U.S. Now! series (and first "Now!" Dance compilation release outside Europe) to consist entirely of tracks and remixes made in the electronic dance music genre. Four tracks have reached number one on the Billboard Hot Dance Club Songs chart — "When Love Takes Over", "LoveGame", "Waking Up in Vegas" and "Wrong".

Now Club Hits debuted on the Billboard 200 album chart at number 31.

On October 12, 2010, Now That's What I Call Club Hits 2 was released.

== Track listing ==
1. The Black Eyed Peas – "Boom Boom Guetta" (David Guetta's Electro Hop Remix) 3:59
2. Sean Kingston – "Fire Burning" (Dave Audé Radio Remix) 4:04
3. Flo Rida featuring Kesha – "Right Round" (Benny Benassi Remix Edit) 3:22
4. Pitbull – "I Know You Want Me (Calle Ocho)" (More English Radio Edit) 2:58
5. David Guetta featuring Kelly Rowland – "When Love Takes Over" (Electro Radio Edit) 3:04
6. Kid Cudi – "Day 'n' Nite" (Crookers Remix Radio Edit) 2:42
7. Keri Hilson featuring Kanye West & Ne-Yo – "Knock You Down" (Bimbo Jones Radio Remix) 4:27
8. Ciara featuring Justin Timberlake – "Love Sex Magic" (Jason Nevins Sex Club Radio Mix) 3:20
9. Jamie Foxx featuring T-Pain – "Blame It" (The New Devices Remix) 4:14
10. Lady Gaga – "LoveGame" (Dave Audé Radio Mix) 3:27
11. Kelly Clarkson – "My Life Would Suck Without You" (Chriss Ortega Radio Mix) 3:36
12. Pink – "Please Don't Leave Me" (Digital Dog Radio Mix) 3:41
13. Katy Perry – "Waking Up in Vegas" (Calvin Harris Remix Edit) 3:39
14. The Killers – "Spaceman" (Tiësto Remix) 5:55
15. Kevin Rudolf featuring Lil Wayne – "Let It Rock" (Filthy Dukes Radio) 3:48
16. Bad Boy Bill featuring Alyssa Palmer – "Falling Anthem" 4:22
17. Empire of the Sun – "Walking on a Dream" (Kaskade Remix) 4:33
18. Depeche Mode – "Wrong" (Thin White Duke Remix) 5:01
19. Jackson 5 – "Dancing Machine" (Polow Remix) 3:14

== Charts ==
=== Weekly charts ===
Chart (2009)	Peak position
US Billboard 200	31
US Top Dance/Electronic Albums (Billboard)	2

=== Year-end charts ===
Chart (2009)	Position
US Top Dance/Electronic Albums (Billboard)	15
Chart (2010)	Position
US Top Dance/Electronic Albums (Billboard)	14

== See also ==
- Now That's What I Call Party Hits! (American series)
