= The Essential Now That's What I Call Christmas =

Compilation album by Various artists
- Released: September 23, 2008
- Genre: Christmas music
- Length: 79:02
- Label: Universal Music Group

Full series chronology
Now That's What I Call Country (2008)	The Essential Now That's What I Call Christmas (2008)	Now That's What I Call Music! 29 (2008)

Christmas chronology
Now That's What I Call Christmas! 3 (2006)	The Essential Now That's What I Call Christmas (2008)	Now That's What I Call a Country Christmas (2009)

The Essential Now That's What I Call Christmas is a holiday album from the Now That's What I Call Music! franchise in the United States, released on September 23, 2008. The album has sold 571,000 copies as of December 2012.

== Track list ==
No.	Title	Artist	Length
1.	"Happy Xmas (War Is Over)"	John & Yoko and the Plastic Ono Band with the Harlem Community Choir	3:31
2.	"Blue Christmas"	Elvis Presley	2:06
3.	"It's the Most Wonderful Time of the Year"	Andy Williams	2:30
4.	"Baby, It's Cold Outside"	Dean Martin	2:20
5.	"It's Beginning to Look a Lot Like Christmas"	Johnny Mathis	2:13
6.	"The Little Drummer Boy"	Harry Simeone Chorale	3:18
7.	"A Holly Jolly Christmas (Single)"	Burl Ives	2:13
8.	"Rudolph the Red-Nosed Reindeer"	Gene Autry	3:12
9.	"Little Saint Nick"	The Beach Boys	2:00
10.	"The Chipmunk Song (Christmas Don't Be Late)"	Alvin and the Chipmunks	2:20
11.	"Santa Claus Is Coming to Town"	The Jackson 5	2:22
12.	"Run Rudolph Run"	Chuck Berry	2:42
13.	"Grandma Got Run Over by a Reindeer"	Elmo & Patsy	3:27
14.	"Rockin' Around the Christmas Tree"	Brenda Lee	2:05
15.	"Feliz Navidad"	José Feliciano	3:02
16.	"This Christmas"	Donny Hathaway	4:05
17.	"Wonderful Christmastime"	Paul McCartney	3:44
18.	"Step into Christmas"	Elton John	4:27
19.	"Last Christmas"	Wham!	4:45
20.	"Jingle Bell Rock"	Hall & Oates	2:02
21.	"Do You Hear What I Hear?"	Carrie Underwood	4:09
22.	"Breath of Heaven (Mary's Song)"	Amy Grant	5:25
23.	"Mistletoe"	Colbie Caillat	3:49
24.	"This Christmas (Could Be the One)"	Ledisi	4:41
25.	"Silent Night"	The Temptations	2:21

== Reception ==
Professional ratings
Review scores
Source	Rating
Allmusic	3/5 stars

Steve Leggett of Allmusic says that this volume of the Now! series offers a generous selection at 25 tracks and "will put a little skip, hop and beat into your holiday spirit."

== Charts ==
=== Weekly charts ===
Chart (2008)	Peak position
US Billboard 200	30

=== Year-end charts ===
Chart (2009)	Position
US Billboard 200	158
