= Live Earth concert, New Jersey =

Concert event

Live Earth
- New York City Concert location
Location	Giants Stadium, East Rutherford, New Jersey, United States Near New York City
Founded by	Al Gore and Kevin Wall
Date	July 7, 2007
Genre(s)	Pop and Rock music
Website	Live Earth US Site

The Live Earth concert for North America was held at Giants Stadium, East Rutherford, New Jersey, United States (near New York City) on July 7, 2007.

== Running order ==
In order of appearance:

- Kenna - "Out Of Control", "Face The Gun", "Sun Red Sky Blue" (GS 14:30)
- Kevin Bacon (presenter) (GS 14:55)
- KT Tunstall - "Black Horse and the Cherry Tree", "Other Side of the World" and "Suddenly I See" (GS 15:00)
- Dhani Jones (presenter) (GS 15:25)
- Taking Back Sunday - "What's It Feel Like to Be a Ghost?", "Liar (It Takes One to Know One)", "My Blue Heaven", "MakeDamnSure" (GS 15:30)
- Leonardo DiCaprio (presenter) (GS 15:55)
- Al Gore (presenter) (GS 16:00)
- Keith Urban - "Gimme Shelter" (with Alicia Keys), "Days Go By", "Stupid Boy", "I Told You So" (GS 16:05)
- Petra Nemcova (presenter) (GS 16:30)
- Ludacris - "Number One Spot", "Stand Up", "Yeah", "Pimpin' All Over the World", "Runaway Love", "Glamorous", "What's Your Fantasy", "Move Bitch" and "Money Maker" (GS 16:35)
- Petra Nemcova (presenter) (GS 17:00)
- AFI - "The Missing Frame", "Love Like Winter", "Ziggy Stardust" and "Miss Murder" (GS 17:05)
- Fall Out Boy - "Sugar, We're Goin Down", "Thnks fr th Mmrs", "Dance, Dance" and "This Ain't a Scene, It's an Arms Race" with "I Write Sins Not Tragedies" intro (GS 17:30)
- Akon - "Shake Down", "We Takin Over", "I Wanna Love You", "Smack That", "Don't Matter" and "Mama Africa" (GS 17:55)
- Zach Braff (presenter) (GS 18:20)
- John Mayer - "Belief", "Vultures", "Gravity" and "Waiting on the World to Change" (GS 23:25)
- Kevin Bacon (presenter) (GS 18:40)
- Melissa Etheridge - "Imagine That", "What Happens Tomorrow" and "I Need to Wake Up" (with "I Believe in Al Gore" interlude) (GS 18:45)
- Al Gore (speech) (GS 19:10)
- Randy Jackson (presenter) (GS 19:20)
- Alicia Keys - "New York, New York"/"For the Love of Money"/"Living for the City", "Mercy Mercy Me", "That's The Thing About Love", "If I Ain't Got You" (GS 19:25)
- Rachel Weisz (presenter) (GS 19:50)
- Jane Goodall (speech) (GS 19:55)
- Dave Matthews Band - "One Sweet World", "Don't Drink the Water", "Anyone Seen the Bridge?", "Too Much" (GS 20:05)
- Abigail and Spencer Breslin (presenters) (GS 20:30)
- Kelly Clarkson - "Walk Away", "How I Feel", "Never Again", "Sober" and "Since U Been Gone" (GS 20:35)
- Rosario Dawson (presenter) (GS 21:00)
- Kanye West - "Heard 'Em Say", "All Falls Down", "Gold Digger", "Stronger", "Diamonds from Sierra Leone", "Can't Tell Me Nothing", "Jesus Walks", "Touch the Sky" (GS 21:05)
- Robert F. Kennedy Jr. (speech) (GS 21:30)
- Cameron Diaz and Al Gore (presenters) (GS 21:40)
- Bon Jovi - "Lost Highway", "It's My Life", "Wanted Dead or Alive", "Who Says You Can't Go Home", "Livin' on a Prayer" (GS 21:45)
- Alec Baldwin and James E. Hansen (presenters) (GS 22:10)
- The Smashing Pumpkins - "United States", "Bullet with Butterfly Wings", "Tarantula", "Today" (GS 22:15)
- Roger Waters - "In the Flesh?", "Money", "Us and Them", "Brain Damage/Eclipse", "The Happiest Days of Our Lives/Another Brick in the Wall, Part II" (with Trenton Youth Choir) (GS 22:40)
- Cameron Diaz (presenter) (GS 23:05)
- The Police - "Driven to Tears", "Roxanne", "Can't Stand Losing You/Reggatta de Blanc", "Message in a Bottle" (with John Mayer and Kanye West) (GS 23:30)
- Al Gore with Tipper Gore (wrap-up) (GS 23:55)

== John Mayer iTunes EP ==
On June 8, 2007, an EP containing the audio tracks of John Mayer's performances at Giants Stadium was released exclusively on iTunes.

== Coverage ==
=== Television ===
In the U.S., NBC Universal's networks had exclusive television rights. The Giants Stadium show had a primetime slot on NBC.
In Canada, CTVglobemedia also had exclusive television rights to this event. The New Jersey concert aired live and uninterrupted on Much Music and highlights appeared on CTV throughout the day.

=== Satellite Radio ===
Live Earth was carried on all major satellite radio carriers in the US such as XM Satellite Radio and Sirius Satellite Radio.

=== Internet ===
Live Earth was broadcast live on liveearth.msn.com, where the entire concert could be seen on-demand until several months after the concerts.
