= Now That's What I Call Music! 27 (American series) =

Compilation album by various artists
- Released: March 11, 2008
- Length: 74:34
- Label: Sony BMG

Series chronology
Now That's What I Call Party Hits! (2007)	Now That's What I Call Music! 27 (2008)	Now That's What I Call Music! 28 (2008)

Professional ratings
Review scores
Source	Rating
Allmusic	3.5/5 stars

Now That's What I Call Music! 27 was released on March 11, 2008. The album is the 27th edition of the Now! series in the United States. It debuted at number two on the Billboard 200, although, with opening week sales at 169,000 units, it was the lowest opening week for a Now! album from the main series since the first volume.

Now! 27 features two Billboard Hot 100 number-one hits, "Kiss Kiss" and "No One", and has been certified Platinum by the RIAA.

== Track listing ==
No.	Title	Artist	Length
1.	"Don't Stop the Music"	Rihanna	4:23
2.	"Just Fine"	Mary J. Blige	3:58
3.	"Feedback"	Janet Jackson	3:55
4.	"Piece of Me"	Britney Spears	3:30
5.	"Clumsy"	Fergie	3:19
6.	"Tattoo"	Jordin Sparks	3:50
7.	"Love Like This"	Natasha Bedingfield featuring Sean Kingston	3:40
8.	"Kiss Kiss"	Chris Brown featuring T-Pain	4:10
9.	"Flashing Lights"	Kanye West featuring Dwele	3:57
10.	"Take You There"	Sean Kingston	3:56
11.	"Suffocate"	J. Holiday	3:34
12.	"No One"	Alicia Keys	4:13
13.	"Love Song"	Sara Bareilles	4:16
14.	"Apologize"	Timbaland featuring OneRepublic	3:04
15.	"Hero/Heroine"	Boys Like Girls	3:43
16.	"Crushcrushcrush"	Paramore	2:59
17.	"Paralyzer"	Finger Eleven	3:25
18.	"Into the Night"	Santana featuring Chad Kroeger of Nickelback	3:40
19.	"Teardrops on My Guitar"	Taylor Swift	2:58
20.	"Everybody"	Keith Urban	3:55

== Charts ==
=== Weekly charts ===
Chart (2008)	Peak position
US Billboard 200	2
US Top R&B/Hip-Hop Albums (Billboard)	4

=== Year-end charts ===
Chart (2008)	Position
US Billboard 200	41
US Top R&B/Hip-Hop Albums (Billboard)	55
