= Because of You (Kelly Clarkson song) =

2005 single by Kelly Clarkson

Single by Kelly Clarkson

from the album Breakaway
- Released: August 16, 2005
- Recorded: 2004
- Studio: NRG Recording Studios (North Hollywood)
- Genre: Pop
- Length: 3:39
- Label: RCA
- Songwriters: Kelly Clarkson; David Hodges; Ben Moody
- Producers: Hodges; Moody

Kelly Clarkson singles chronology
"Behind These Hazel Eyes" (2005)	"Because of You" (2005)	"Walk Away" (2006)

Music video
- "Because of You" on YouTube

"Because of You" is a song recorded by American pop singer Kelly Clarkson for her second studio album, Breakaway (2004). It was written by Clarkson along with its producers David Hodges and Ben Moody, both from Evanescence. It was released on August 16, 2005, by RCA Records, as the third single from Breakaway. Clarkson originally wrote "Because of You" when she was 16 years old to cope with the emotional distress caused by her parents' divorce. She wanted the song to be included on her debut studio album, Thankful (2003), but her record label rejected the song. She then polished the song with Hodges and Moody before successfully convincing her label to include it on Breakaway.

Lyrically, "Because of You" explores the pain of Clarkson's deteriorating relationship with her father. The song begins with a piano-led melody and as it launches into the chorus, the sound of a roaring guitar becomes apparent. "Because of You" received positive reviews from music critics, who complimented its expressive lyrics, creative arrangement, and Clarkson's vocal prowess. It peaked at number seven on the Billboard Hot 100 and sold over 2 million digital downloads in the United States. It was certified platinum by the Recording Industry Association of America (RIAA). "Because of You" became Clarkson's biggest success in Europe, topping the European Hot 100 Singles chart. It also reached number one in Brazil, the Netherlands, Denmark and Switzerland, as well as the top ten in Australia, Austria, Belgium, Germany, Hungary, Ireland, and the United Kingdom.

The song's accompanying music video was directed by Vadim Perelman. Clarkson wrote the treatment for the video herself in order to reflect the pain that she felt due to her parents' divorce. The video's plot centers on Clarkson engaging in a heated argument with her husband in front of her child before realizing that she was repeating her parents' mistake. It won in the category for Best Female Video at the 2006 MTV Video Music Awards. "Because of You" was performed live at numerous venues, including the My December Tour (2007) as well as the All I Ever Wanted Tour (2009). It was covered by several artists including Ronan Parke, who was a runner-up in the fifth series of Britain's Got Talent, and added to the international soundtrack of Brazilian soap opera Belíssima. In 2007, the song was recorded by Reba McEntire as a duet with Clarkson, which was released as a lead single for McEntire's twenty-fourth studio album Reba: Duets. This version reached number 36 on the Canadian Hot 100. "Piece by Piece", the title track from Clarkson's seventh studio album, serves as the canonical sequel to "Because of You".

== Background and writing ==
"My biggest song worldwide is Because of You, and … you may as well grab a knife. That song really is the most depressing one I've ever written. I tried to get it on Thankful, and was laughed at and told I wasn't a good writer. So then I tried to get it on Breakaway – and the label saw the results, people responding to it, and allowed it to become a single. Then took credit for its success, of course."

— Clarkson on trying to get the track into her album, Thankful.

"Because of You" was written by Clarkson alongside its producer, David Hodges and Ben Moody. They also wrote and produced another track, titled "Addicted", that appeared in Clarkson's album Breakaway (2004). Clarkson originally wrote "Because of You" when she was 16 years old as a means of coping with the emotional distress caused by the divorce of her parents. She wrote the lyrics of the song in less than 25 minutes.

In an interview with The Guardian, Clarkson said that she wanted to include the song in her first album, Thankful (2003), but she was laughed at. Then she took the initiative to polish the song by sending a tape to Moody and Hodges, with whom she later worked, and received co-writing credit of the song. Clarkson explained, "Hearing the Evanescence album, you can obviously tell that David and Ben have a real passion for music and that big kind of background. And I have a big voice and I like the music to match it, so it was a real dream team."

According to Moody, he was very impressed with Clarkson and the song itself, saying "She had these ideas already in place for songs; all I really had to do was build music around them and develop them. It was quite easy." Clarkson also admitted that "Because of You" is the most depressing song she has ever written. Despite the revelation, she told Entertainment Weekly in August 2011 that she wanted to be remembered for the song because she had worked hard to get it on Breakaway when everyone was against it. She added, "I think I'm most proud of that song – just getting it on an album because no one liked it until it hit no. 1 worldwide and everybody was on board."

== Composition ==
"Because of You" (2004)
"Because of You" is a piano ballad composed in F minor (then modulating to G minor).

"Because of You" is a piano-driven pop ballad with a length of three minutes and 39 seconds. Sheet music for the song shows the key of F minor, then modulating a whole step to G minor in common time at a moderate tempo of 69 beats per minute, with Clarkson's vocal range spanning over two octaves from A♭_{3} to F_{5}. Tony Heywood of MusicOMH noted that the song's piano arrangement is reminiscent of Tori Amos. Lyrically, "Because of You" is a fiery ode to Clarkson's absentee father, and begins with Clarkson singing "oohs" over a somber piano which creates a "wintry tone." As the song launches into the chorus, the roaring guitar is evident, and the lyrics, "Because of you I never stray too far from the sidewalk / Because of you I learned to play on the safe side so I don't get hurt," were deemed as "touching" by Dave Donelly of Sputnikmusic.

== Critical reception ==
"Because of You" received universal critical acclaim. Film Laureate of Blogcritics considered "Because of You" and "Where Is Your Heart" as his two favorite songs from Breakaway, writing "[Clarkson] commands these two songs like a seasoned pro and directs herself in her songs the way Steven Spielberg said Barbra Streisand directs herself in her songs as if she's directing an actor in a movie." Dave Donnelly of Sputnikmusic compared the song to Evanescence's "My Immortal" (2003). He added that Clarkson managed to take the piano-driven song in a different direction with a "stormy, hard blues vocal... avoiding the typical raised-key final chorus cliché along the way". Christa L. Titus of Billboard lauded the song for its absence of schmaltz factor, "only a potent, pained, grown-up anthem of gross betrayal and loss." She concluded her review, writing "it is time for Clarkson to return to No. 1 on the Billboard Hot 100; she has certainly become the most consistent hope for top 40 staple status."

Critics also lauded Clarkson's vocal prowess in the song. Pam Avoledo of Blogcritics thought that vocally, the song is Clarkson's "shining" moment. Tony Heywood of MusicOMH noted that in the song, Clarkson's voice is "full of vulnerability, ache and wounded pride." On May 15, 2007, the song was listed as one of the recipients of BMI Pop Awards. At the 24th ASCAP Pop Music Awards, the song was honoured with the Most Performed Songs award. In July 2008, BBC News reported that according to Performing Right Society, "Because of You" was the second most played song in the United Kingdom over the last five years, following Daniel Powter's "Bad Day" (2005). On March 5, 2013, Billboard ranked the song at number seven in its list of Top 100 American Idol Hits of All Time. Additionally, it also appeared at number five of Clarkson's Top 15 Biggest Billboard Hot 100 hits through the week ending April 29, 2017.

== Commercial performance ==
"Because of You" entered the Billboard Hot 100 at number 99 on the week ending September 3, 2005. On November 19, 2005, the song peaked at number seven and became her sixth single to reach the top-ten. It also topped the Pop Songs chart on the week ending October 29, 2005. It became the seventh best selling single of the 2000s decade on the Pop Songs chart compiled by Billboard. On January 31, 2008, "Because of You" was certified platinum by the Recording Industry Association of America (RIAA). As of September 2017, the song has sold 2,079,000 digital copies in the United States. The single also appeared and peaked on the UK Singles Chart at number seven on the week ending December 4, 2005. As of April 2016, the song sold over 430,000 copies in the United Kingdom.

In Australia, the song debuted and peaked at number four on the issue dated December 5, 2005. It was certified gold by the Australian Recording Industry Association (ARIA) for shipments over 35,000 units. The song became the 58th best-selling single in Australia in 2006. In New Zealand, "Because of You" debuted on New Zealand Singles Chart at number 37 on the week ending December 5, 2005, and peaked at number 19 two weeks later. On the week ending March 20, 2006, "Because of You" debuted at number eight on the German Singles Chart. Three weeks later, it peaked at number four and stayed in the position for three consecutive weeks. The song was certified gold by The Federal Association of Music Industry for shipments over 150,000 copies. In Europe, "Because of You" received a commercial success. The song topped the charts in the Netherlands and Switzerland, and reached the top five in Austria, Belgium (Flanders), Ireland and Norway.

== Music video ==
=== Development ===
The accompanying music video for "Because of You" was directed by Vadim Perelman and was produced by Rhonda Vernet. Clarkson wrote the treatment for the video herself in order to reflect the pain that she felt due to her parents' divorce. Nevertheless, Clarkson also allowed Perelman to take control of the production of the video. According to Perelman, he wanted to create a disconnection to show "that this kind of dysfunctional family can exist anywhere." In an interview with MTV News, Clarkson confessed that the video is sad, rationalizing, "It's a sad song, so the video obviously has to follow that. But it ends really happy and everything and the family, my family, ends up breaking the cycle of my parents." Since the music video deals specifically with her parents' divorce, Clarkson had to seek for her parents' permission. She explained,

"It's very close to home [for me]. I OK'd it with my family and everything because they think it's important, because we're obviously very different now than we were when we were younger. And it's important for people to see that raw kind of emotion that happens in life. It sucks sometimes, so it's important to see that I think. And that's what we're portraying in the video."

In the video, the younger version of Clarkson is played by Kennedy Nöel, the daughter of her musical director, Jason Halbert. The video premiered on October 3, 2005, on Total Request Live.

=== Synopsis ===
Clarkson and her younger self (Kennedy Nöel) in the music video of "Because of You."

The video starts at the Clarksons' household. There, she and her husband are engaged in a heated argument and he threatens to smash down a picture of the family at one point. Time freezes still and her husband becomes immobile; Clarkson, however, is immune to this. Looking around her house, she sees her younger self. Hand in hand, the younger and older versions of Clarkson relive her troubled childhood as various painful memories are seen, such as the younger Clarkson making a picture for her father who tosses it into the sink while talking on the phone, and Clarkson's mother making an unappreciated dinner for her father as she puts the father's dinner into the bin on a stormy evening. These events drive her mother to the point of taking pills before closing the door in the younger Clarkson's face, so that she doesn't see her starting to cry. The breaking point is finally seen when Clarkson's parents have a physical fight and throw objects at each other. Soon after, Clarkson's father packs his bags and leaves despite the younger Clarkson's pleas for him to stay. The older Clarkson runs back in time to the present, and instead of fighting with her husband, they make up. They then see that their daughter in the video had seen them fight, and they embrace her and each other. Throughout the music video, Clarkson is shown singing on the front porch, her mother's bed and a room full of mirrors, reflecting an image of her younger self.

=== Reception and accolades ===
Elizabeth Black of VH1 ranked the music video at number four in her list of "Five Emotive Music Video Performances." She reasoned, "Kelly Clarkson practically sobs her way through this hurt and angry expression of the pain that the narrator's father has caused her through his absence and lack of love." The same opinion was echoed by Johnni Macke of E! who felt that watching the music video was heartbreaking. She explained, "It really paints a picture of the heartbreak that comes from your family fighting in front of you. Clarkson gets real as she sings the sad lyrics and witnesses the sadness that comes when someone breaks your family into pieces." The music video won the category of Best Female Video at the 2006 MTV Video Music Awards. This marks the second time Clarkson has won the same category two years in a row; her first win in the category was at the 2005 MTV Video Music Awards for the music video of "Since U Been Gone." The music video was also nominated in the category of Viewer's Choice Award, but lost to Fall Out Boy's "Dance, Dance" (2005). At the 2006 MuchMusic Video Awards, the music video won the category of People's Choice: Favourite International Artist. The video was also nominated at the 2006 MTV Australia Video Music Awards in the category of Best Pop Video, but lost to Ashlee Simpson's "Boyfriend" (2005). According to Jocelyn Vena of MTV, the video for "Because of You" was referenced in Taylor Swift's music video for "Mine" (2010), writing "When Swift's character remembers the fights her parents used to have, her memories mirror Clarkson's attempts to exorcise the demons of her past to find love in her future."

== Live performances ==
Clarkson performed "Because of You" at the 48th Grammy Awards which took place on February 8, 2006, at the Staples Center in Los Angeles, California. Donning a red dress and singing from beside a grand piano, her performance in that event garnered positive reviews from critics. Elysa Gardner of USA Today lauded Clarkson's performance and ranked it as one of the three best performances, writing, "The pre-performance clip of a girlish-looking Clarkson emphasized how little Kelly has matured. The girl most likely to escape the American Idol stigma was in fine, creamy voice, and kept the Mariah-esque riffing to a minimum." Robert Lloyd of the Los Angeles Times considered Clarkson's performance as one of the highlights in the event and described her performance as a "thin-skinned rendition [...] in which her whole being seemed involved." Yahoo! Music praised Clarkson's rendition of the song, calling it "perfectly fine" despite the saying that it was "a little reminiscent of those many mediocre, superficial ballads trotted out on 'Idol.'" In 2016, the performance was listed by Billboard as one of Clarkson's ten "most powerful and undeniable performances." Jason Scott of Billboard commented, "Here, Clarkson serves up her signature power ballad backed by lush orchestration, sending chills through the crowd shortly before picking up two statues: best pop vocal album for Breakaway and best female pop vocal performance for "Since U Been Gone."

On August 21, 2007, Clarkson performed "Because of You" and "Never Again" (2007) on the fifth season of Canadian Idol. "Because of You" was performed at the My December Tour (2007). Clarkson's performance of the song was accompanied only by Wurlitzer organ that earned her a prolonged ovation when she sent her voice soaring into the rafters. While touring at Beacon Theatre, New York City, Clarkson performed the song using only one keyboard, which was deemed by Donna Freydkin of USA Today as the most memorable moment of the event. She also performed the song using only a keyboard as an instrument during her tour at Massey Hall, Toronto. "Because of You" was also performed at the All I Ever Wanted Tour (2009). Clarkson's performance of the song during the tour in the Hammerstein Ballroom, New York City, was given a positive review by Jim Cantiello of MTV. He explained that Clarkson's powerful rendition "literally stopped the show [...] for almost 30 seconds because the audience erupted in such wild applause." Caryn Ganz of Rolling Stone noted that Clarkson sang the song to pay homage to Reba McEntire who was in the audience.

== Track listings ==
- CD single
1. "Because of You" (album version) – 3:39
2. "Since U Been Gone" (Napster Live) – 3:21
3. "Because of You" (Jason Nevins Radio Edit) – 3:58
4. "Because of You" – 3:39
- Dance Vault Mixes
1. "Because of You" (Jason Nevins radio) – 3:40
2. "Because of You" (Jason Nevins Club Mix) – 6:24
3. "Because of You" (Jason Nevins Club With Intro Breakdown) – 6:22
4. "Because of You" (Jason Nevins Dub) – 7:53
5. "Because of You" (Jason Nevins Club Instrumental) – 6:24
6. "Because of You" (Jason Nevins Radio Instrumental) – 3:58
7. "Because of You" (Jason Nevins Remix - Acoustic Version without Strings) – 3:51
8. "Because of You" (Jason Nevins Acoustic) – 3:50
9. "Because of You" (Jason Nevins Acapella) – 3:54

- Remixes CD single
1. "Because of You" (Bermudez & Griffin Radio Mix) – 4:04
2. "Because of You" (Bermudez & Griffin Club Mix) – 7:35
3. "Because of You" (Bermudez & Griffin Ultimix) – 5:23
4. "Because of You" (Bermudez & Griffin Tribe-a-Pella) – 5:24
5. "Because of You" (Bermudez & Griffin Club Mix Instrumental) – 7:35
6. "Because of You" (Bermudez & Griffin Ultimix Instrumental) – 5:23
7. "Because of You" (Bermudez & Griffin Bonus Beats) – 3:36
8. "Because of You" (Bermudez & Griffin Radio Mix Instrumental) – 4:01
9. "Because of You" - 3:40

== Credits and personnel ==
Credits are lifted from the Breakaway liner notes.

Recording

- Recorded by Dan Certa at NRG Recording Studios, North Hollywood, California

Personnel

- Kelly Clarkson – lead vocals and background vocals
- Ben Moody – producer, guitar
- David Campbell – string arrangement
- David Hodges – producer, piano, string arrangement
- Marty O'Brien – strings, Bass

- John Hanes – additional pro-tools engineer
- Mark Colbert – drums
- Sergio Chavez – assistant engineer
- Şerban Ghenea – mixing
- Tim Roberts – mixing assistant

== Charts ==
=== Weekly charts ===
Chart (2005–2006)	Peak position
Australia (ARIA)	4
Austria (Ö3 Austria Top 40)	3
Belgium (Ultratop 50 Flanders)	5
Belgium (Ultratop 50 Wallonia)	16
Brazil (Crowley Broadcast Analysis)	1
Canada CHR/Pop Top 30 (Radio & Records)	3
Canada Hot AC Top 30 (Radio & Records)	3
Czech Republic Airplay (ČNS IFPI)	13
Denmark Airplay (Tracklisten)	1
Europe (Eurochart Hot 100)	1
France (SNEP)	13
Germany (GfK)	4
Germany Airplay (BVMI)	1
Hungary (Rádiós Top 40)	2
Ireland (IRMA)	5
Italy (FIMI)	31
Netherlands (Dutch Top 40)	1
Netherlands (Single Top 100)	1
New Zealand (Recorded Music NZ)	19
Norway (VG-lista)	5
Scottish Singles Sales (Official Charts)	6
Slovakia Airplay (ČNS IFPI)	75
Sweden (Sverigetopplistan)	30
Switzerland (Schweizer Hitparade)	1
UK Singles (Official Charts)	7
UK Airplay (Music Week)	5
US Billboard Hot 100	7
US Adult Contemporary (Billboard)	3
US Adult Pop Airplay (Billboard)	2
US Dance Club Songs (Billboard)	24
US Pop Airplay (Billboard)	1

Chart (2010)	Peak position
South Korea (Gaon Digital Chart)	46

Chart (2015)	Peak position
Slovenia (SloTop50)	50

=== Year-end charts ===
Chart (2005)	Position
UK Singles (OCC)	103
US Billboard Hot 100	72
US Adult Top 40 (Billboard)	69
US Mainstream Top 40 (Billboard)	33

Chart (2006)	Position
Australia (ARIA)	58
Austria (Ö3 Austria Top 40)	19
Belgium (Ultratop 50 Flanders)	22
Belgium (Ultratop 50 Wallonia)	48
Brazil (Crowley Broadcast Analysis)	1
Europe (Eurochart Hot 100)	12
France (SNEP)	76
Germany (Media Control GfK)	19
Hungary (Rádiós Top 40)	11
Italy (FIMI)	92
Netherlands (Dutch Top 40)	22
Netherlands (Single Top 100)	55
Netherlands (NVPI Download Top 10)	9
Russia Airplay (TopHit)	26
Switzerland (Schweizer Hitparade)	8
UK Singles (OCC)	83
UK Airplay (Music Week)	10
US Billboard Hot 100	39
US Adult Contemporary (Billboard)	4
US Adult Top 40 (Billboard)	10

Chart (2010)	Position
South Korea International (Gaon)	4

Chart (2011)	Position
South Korea International (Gaon)	42

Chart (2012)	Position
South Korea International (Gaon)	82

Chart (2013)	Position
South Korea International (Gaon)	63

Chart (2014)	Position
South Korea International (Gaon)	83

Chart (2015)	Position
South Korea International (Gaon)	66

=== Decade-end charts ===
Chart (2000–2009)	Position
CIS Airplay (TopHit)	193
Russia Airplay (TopHit)	175

== Certifications and sales ==
Region	Certification	Certified units/sales
Australia (ARIA)	Gold	35,000^{^}
Brazil (Pro-Música Brasil)	Platinum	60,000^{*}
Canada (Music Canada)	Gold	20,000^{*}
Denmark (IFPI Danmark)	Platinum	90,000^{‡}
Germany (BVMI)	Gold	150,000^{^}
New Zealand (RMNZ)	2× Platinum	60,000^{‡}
Norway (IFPI Norway)	2× Platinum	20,000^{*}
South Korea (Gaon)	—	2,183,170
United Kingdom (BPI)	2× Platinum	1,200,000^{‡}
United States (RIAA)	Platinum	2,079,000
United States (RIAA) Mastertone	Gold	500,000^{^}
^{*} Sales figures based on certification alone.^{^} Shipments figures based on certification alone.^{‡} Sales+streaming figures based on certification alone.

== Release history ==
Release dates and formats for "Because of You"
Region	Date	Format	Label(s)	Ref(s).
United States	August 16, 2005	Contemporary hit radio	RCA	
Australia	November 27, 2005	Maxi single	RCA; Sony BMG	
United Kingdom	November 28, 2005	CD single (CD 1)	RCA; Sony BMG	
United Kingdom	November 28, 2005	Maxi single (CD 2)	RCA; Sony BMG	
Germany	February 17, 2006	Digital download	RCA; Sony BMG	
Germany	February 24, 2006	CD single	RCA; Sony BMG	

== Cover versions ==
Lisa Tucker covered the song on the fifth season of American Idol in 2006. However, her performance was met with negative reviews from the judges and she was consequently eliminated from the show. On June 4, 2011, Britain's Got Talent contestant, Ronan Parke covered "Because of You" in the finale of the fifth series of the show. Parke also recorded the song and included it in his debut album, Ronan Parke. In an interview with Digital Spy, Parke stated that it was really challenging to record "Because of You." He added, "I asked the producer if we could leave out some of the big notes. We left them until the end and I was actually a bit scared by the noise that came out of me - I didn't know I could sound that loud!" "Because of You" was also covered by Kim Bo Kyung, who was a contestant in South Korean singing competition show, Superstar K2. Her performance received positive response from the judges and was considered as one of the highlights in the show even though she failed to advance into the Top 11. Following her elimination, she recorded the studio version of "Because of You" which was released as a digital download by Sony Music Entertainment due to an overwhelming demand. She also received a personal video message from Clarkson who gave her words of advice and support. The song also was covered by Orange Caramel, a South Korean girl group, on Christmas Day for MBC's special programme, "ICON". Besides these cover versions, "Because of You" was also included in international soundtrack to Brazilian soap opera Belíssima.

== Reba McEntire and Kelly Clarkson version ==
"Because of You"

Single by Reba McEntire and Kelly Clarkson

from the album Reba: Duets
- Released: May 15, 2007
- Recorded: 2007
- Studio: Starstruck Studios (Nashville, TN)
- Genre: Country pop
- Length: 3:45
- Label: MCA Nashville
- Songwriters: Kelly Clarkson; David Hodges; Ben Moody
- Producers: Tony Brown; Reba McEntire

Reba McEntire singles chronology
"Love Needs a Holiday" (2006)	"Because of You" (2007)	"The Only Promise That Remains" (2007)

Kelly Clarkson singles chronology
"Never Again" (2007)	"Because of You" (2007)	"Sober" (2007)

Music video
- "Because of You" on YouTube

In 2007, Clarkson re-recorded "Because of You" as a duet with American country singer Reba McEntire. The song was released as a single on May 15, 2007, as the lead single for McEntire's album, Reba: Duets. The duet garnered mixed reviews from critics, some of whom felt that the cover brought nothing new to the song. At the 50th Grammy Awards, McEntire and Clarkson received a nomination for Best Vocal Country Collaboration for the song. In the United States, "Because of You" became McEntire's seventh song to peak at number two at Hot Country Songs. It also became Clarkson's second song to appear on the chart. The music video was directed by Roman White which depicts McEntire and Clarkson as two retro Hollywood lounge singers. The plot centers on Clarkson's relationship with her abusive partner which is witnessed by McEntire. The song was performed live by the two singers in various venues, notably at the 42nd Annual Academy of Country Music Awards and during their 2 Worlds 2 Voices Tour.

=== Background and composition ===
"Because of You" (2007)
A 21 second sample of "Because of You", which incorporates the sound of guitar, strings, cymbals and violin.

According to McEntire, Clarkson was the first singer to pair up with her for the album Reba: Duets (2007). She also claimed that "Because of You" was not the original song to be included in the album; it was another song that she recorded with Clarkson, titled "A Lot Like You." McEntire explained that it was Narvel, her husband, who convinced her to go back in the studio and record "Because of You" after he heard both McEntire and Clarkson rehearsing the song. She expressed, "Narvel saw it. That wasn't one of the songs we had talked about recording – matter of fact, Kelly and I had already recorded a song, 'A Lot Like You,' for the duet project, and he said, 'You've got to do this one together,' so we did." Musically, the song is different from the original version. Thom Jhurek of Allmusic described the duet version as "a big, overblown power ballad" which incorporates "guitars compressed to the breaking point, sweeping strings, and enormous crashing cymbals." The use of violin was also incorporated into the duet, giving it a melodramatic quality that was deemed "unnecessary" by Nancy Dunham of Blogcritics. The song was officially sent to radio stations on May 15, 2007, as the lead single from the album. It was added to country radio playlists on May 28, 2007.

=== Critical reception ===
The duet received mixed reviews from music critics. Lana Cooper of PopMatters loved the duet and deemed it as "the most unique track on the album." She also felt that McEntire and Clarkson complemented each other in the song, writing "The double-feature cover of Clarkson's hit showcases two women with exceptional and distinctive voices playing to one another's strengths." The same opinion was echoed by Nancy Dunham of Blogcritics who believed that "the two use just the right amount of vocal passion to make the ardent lyrics come alive, but stay out of the cheese zone." Scott Sexton of About.com lauded the duet version of the song, writing "As of now anything Reba touches turns to gold, but with this hit alone she has a great shot at platinum." Kevin John Coyne of Country Universe praised McEntire's beautiful singing although he said that she did not bring "anything new" to the song. He also added that the song "had the potential to be reworked into an interesting mother/daughter confrontation" but he was disappointed because McEntire did not change the viewpoints of the song. He graded the production of the song as "C−", writing "The end result is the song doesn't make any sense, and is just confusing to listen to." Thom Jurek of Allmusic criticized the instrumentation of the song, saying "This could have been a Meat Loaf reject from Bat Out of Hell II." Gayle Thompson of The Boot ranked "Because of You" at number ten in her list of "Top 20 Reba McEntire songs." She also included both McEntire and Clarkson at number six for their duet of "Because of You" in her list of "Cross Country: Top 10 Country-Pop Duets." Gary Trust of Billboard listed the pair as one of the 10 all-female hit collaborations that have scaled Billboard charts in recent years. On March 5, 2013, Billboard ranked the song number 71 in its list of Top 100 American Idol Hits of All Time.

At the 42nd Annual Academy of Country Music Awards, McEntire and Clarkson received a nomination in the category of Musical Event of the Year for "Because of You," but lost to Tracy Lawrence with Kenny Chesney and Tim McGraw for their collaboration in "Find Out Who Your Friends Are" (2006). At the 50th Grammy Awards, McEntire and Clarkson received a nomination in the category of Best Vocal Country Collaboration for the song, but lost to Willie Nelson and Ray Price. The pair also received a nomination for the Vocal Event of the Year at the 2008 Academy of Country Music, but lost to Tracy Lawrence with Kenny Chesney and Tim McGraw for their collaboration in "Find Out Who Your Friends Are". At the 2008 ASCAP Country Music Awards, the song was honoured with the Most Performed Songs award.

=== Commercial performance ===
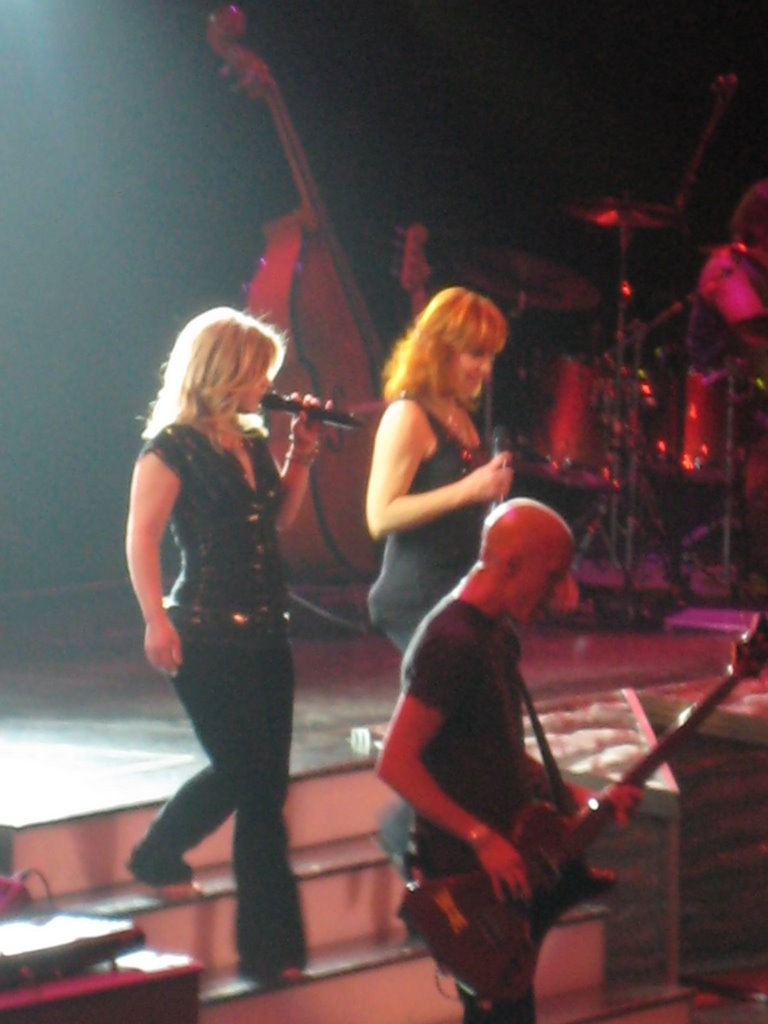
McEntire and Clarkson singing "Because of You" as part of the encore of their 2 Worlds 2 Voices Tour.

In the United States, "Because of You" debuted at number 42 on the Hot Country Songs on the week ending June 2, 2007. On the week ending September 8, 2007, the song jumped to its new peak at number two and was held off the top spot by Rodney Atkins' "These Are My People" (2007). It became McEntire's seventh song to peak at number two, and her first in over ten years. Had the song jumped to number one, it would have been McEntire's 23rd number one song on the chart as well as the first remake of a pop song to top Hot Country Songs since Mark Chesnutt's cover of Aerosmith's "I Don't Want to Miss a Thing" spent two weeks at number one in 1999. "Because of You" also made an appearance on the Billboard Hot 100 at number 52, and peaked at number 50. This version has sold 621,000 copies in the US as of September 2017. In Canada, "Because of You" debuted at number 60 on the Canadian Hot 100 on the week ending July 14, 2007. Two weeks later, the song jumped to a new peak at number 36 and stayed in the position for two weeks. It was certified gold by Music Canada on December 4, 2007, for shipments over 40,000 units.

=== Music video ===
The music video, directed by Roman White, debuted on June 21, 2007. It depicts McEntire and Clarkson as 1930's Hollywood lounge singers. In the video, McEntire encounters Clarkson attempting to conceal a bruise inflicted by the latter's abusive partner. When Clarkson's boyfriend is fighting with her, McEntire leaves the dressing room. While performing on stage, Clarkson witnesses her boyfriend played by Andrew M. Springer flirting with another woman. After the performance, she smashes a vase out of anger in the dressing room. Her boyfriend enters the room to take her out for the rest of the evening. Though apprehensive, Clarkson leaves on his arm before looking back uncertainly at McEntire, who uncomfortably fiddles with a hairbrush as she watches them leave. The music video hit number one on CMT's Top 20 Countdown on September 13, 2007. At the 2008 CMT Music Awards, the music video received nominations for three awards. It received a nomination for the Video of the Year, but lost to Taylor Swift's "Our Song" (2007) and for the Collaborative Video of the Year, but lost to Bon Jovi featuring LeAnn Rimes, "Till We Ain't Strangers Anymore" (2007). Roman White, who directed the music video, received a nomination for the Video Director of the Year, but lost to Michael Salomon.

=== Live performances ===
McEntire and Clarkson first performed "Because of You" together at the 42nd Annual Academy of Country Music Awards in May 2007. A month later, the pair performed the song in an episode of CMT Crossroads at Ryman Auditorium which debuted on Country Music Television on June 24, 2007. On September 19, 2007, they appeared on The Oprah Winfrey Show where they sang the song together. "Because of You" was also performed as the encore of the 2 Worlds 2 Voices Tour (2008), a co-headlining concert tour by McEntire and Clarkson.

=== Track listings ===
- US CD single
1. "Because of You" – 3:44
2. "Because of You" – 3:44
3. "Because of You" – 3:43

- UK digital download
1. "Because of You" – 3:45

=== Charts ===
==== Weekly charts ====
Weekly chart performance for "Because of You"
Chart (2007)	Peak position
Canada Hot 100 (Billboard)	36
Canada Country (Billboard)	1
US Billboard Hot 100	50
US Hot Country Songs (Billboard)	2

==== Year-end charts ====
Year-end chart performance for "Because of You"
Chart (2007)	Position
US Country Songs (Billboard)	33

=== Certifications ===
Certifications and sales for "Because of You"
Region	Certification	Certified units/sales
United States (RIAA)	Platinum	1,000,000^{‡}
^{‡} Sales+streaming figures based on certification alone.

== See also ==
- List of Billboard Mainstream Top 40 number-one songs of 2005
- List of Dutch Top 40 number-one singles of 2006
- List of European number-one hits of 2006
- List of number-one hits of 2006 (Switzerland)
