= Never Again (Kelly Clarkson song) =

2007 single by Kelly Clarkson

Single by Kelly Clarkson

from the album My December
- Released: April 24, 2007
- Studio: Mower Studios (Pasadena), The Village Recorder (Santa Monica)
- Genre: Alternative rock; hard rock; pop rock
- Length: 3:37
- Label: RCA
- Songwriters: Kelly Clarkson; Jimmy Messer
- Producer: David Kahne

Kelly Clarkson singles chronology
"Walk Away" (2006)	"Never Again" (2007)	"Because of You" (2007)

Music video
- "Never Again" on YouTube

"Never Again" is a song recorded by American singer Kelly Clarkson for her third studio album, My December (2007). Clarkson co-wrote the song with Jimmy Messer, which was produced by American producer and musician David Kahne. Clarkson stated that the song was written as a counterpart to the songs from her second studio album, Breakaway (2004), and was almost removed because of its harsh lyrical nature. RCA Records serviced the song to mainstream radio in the United States on April 24, 2007 as the lead single from the album, coinciding with Clarkson's 25th birthday. "Never Again" features a stronger rock sound than Clarkson's previous releases, but maintains some pop undertones. It relies on strings, guitar riffs and drums and is centered on angry, abrasive lyrics.

"Never Again" received positive reviews from music critics, with many citing it as a darker counterpart to "Since U Been Gone" (2004) and as one of her best releases; it drew some comparisons to the works of Pat Benatar. The song fared well in international as well as domestic markets, but failed to mimic the success of her previous lead singles. It peaked at number eight on the Billboard Hot 100 and was certified gold by the Recording Industry Association of America (RIAA). It was also certified gold in Canada and Australia while peaking within the top ten in both regions. The song has sold over one million downloads in the United States. The accompanying music video for "Never Again" was released on May 1, 2007, in the United States. It portrays Clarkson being drowned in a bathtub and in various scenes acting as a ghost, haunting her ex-boyfriend following the end of their relationship.

== Background ==
"Never Again" was written and composed by Kelly Clarkson and Jimmy Messer while American producer and musician David Kahne produced the song with Messer and Jason Halbert. The song was conceived around the same subject as "Since U Been Gone" and "Behind These Hazel Eyes", which were included on her second studio album Breakaway (2004). The song was written as a contrast to those songs, saying that "neither was originally written" with that thought in mind and were adjusted "after the fact." It was almost removed from My December's track listing, but Clarkson found to be fitting as the album's opener, stating "it's a fun song, and that's why we kept it. It's just got such great energy. It's so blunt — I was so angry — and it reads so well, so we just went with it." Kahne also provides the keys, along with Halbert, and Messer provided the guitars. The instruments were played by Billy Mohler, who plays the bass, and Shawn Pelton, who provides the drums.

== Composition ==
"Never Again"
The song is influenced by the work of Alanis Morissette and Pat Benatar.

"Never Again" is an alternative rock, hard rock and pop rock song with a length of 3:37 (3 minutes and 37 seconds). It also incorporates elements of arena rock and electro. "Never Again" consists of ringing guitar riffs, faux-strings, Queens of the Stone Age-style drums, and sharp vocals. The song has been described as an embittered anthem about the end of a relationship. Clarkson, in an interview with MTV, has cited Alanis Morissette's 1995 single "You Oughta Know" and Pat Benatar as influences for the record. According to her, someone at her label disliked the song because it was too similar to Benatar's music. "I was like, 'Now I really like it! I love her, and what's wrong with you?'", Clarkson said. "I love any kind of rock chick who's just totally into what she's doing. What's funny is that we now think of her as a rock icon, but she was pretty pop as well. And I'm pretty pop too — I'm a rock/pop girl, which is cool with me."

According to the digital music sheet published at Musicnotes.com by Alfred Publishing Company, Inc, it is written in the key of G minor. The song is set in common time and follows a moderately fast tempo of 138 beats per minute. Clarkson's vocals ranged from G_{3} to an E♭_{5}. Many critics made comparisons to "Since U Been Gone" (Breakaway, 2004). Tina Mrazik of Yahoo! Music compared it to "Since U Been Gone", commenting its similarity in regard to vocals. Sal Cinquemani of Slant Magazine describes "Never Again" as a slightly harder and less immediate version of the entire Breakaway album.

== Critical reception ==
Sarah Rodman of The Boston Globe comments that the song "comes much closer, pleasingly so, to the polished angst and power chords of Alanis Morissette and Pat Benatar than it does to, say, 'Gimme Shelter' or 'Nebraska.'" AllMusic writer Stephen Thomas Erlewine selected it among others as one of the album's best tracks. Chris Willman, a writer for Entertainment Weekly, comments "There was subversive fun to be had in witnessing America's sweetheart using 'Never Again,' the he-done-me-wrong first single, to reinvent herself as a banshee (wishing gangrene on an enemy, no less)." Spence D. of IGN praised the song as an intriguing departure for Clarkson, writing that "she's kicking out the verbals with gusto."

J. Freedom du Lac, a writer for The Washington Post, commented on the song's poor performance on the charts compared to singles off of Breakaway, writing that it lacks a memorable melody. Cinema Blend's Brendan Butler lauded it as the only radio-friendly tune on My December, writing that "There’s no denying it’s a hot tune that would be better accompanied by tracks not trying to repeat its identical magic." Susan Frances of Hybrid Magazine described it as having the "pop-rock propulsion of Chevalle." Tony Heywood of musicOMH labeled it as "A smart mini pop metal explosion of angst and rage." "Never Again" ranked number 99 on Rolling Stone's list of the 100 Best Songs of 2007 and number 63 on AT40's 100 Most Played Songs of 2007. It also ranked at number 70 on Billboard's 2007 Year End Chart. On March 5, 2013, Billboard ranked the song #26 in its list of Top 100 American Idol Hits of All Time.

== Chart performance ==
"Never Again" was a moderate hit in many international territories. In the United States, on the week ending May 12, 2007, the song debuted on the Billboard Hot 100 at number eight due to the strength of over 100,000 digital downloads sold during the first week of release. The song fell to number 12 in the following week and continued to fall until its fifth week, when it regained momentum and rose to number nine. "Never Again" lasted a total of 16 weeks on the Hot 100. The song also charted on several Billboard charts, peaking at number four on Hot Digital Songs, number 12 on Adult Pop Songs, number 20 on Pop Songs, and number 47 on Radio Songs. It was certified gold by the Recording Industry Association of America (RIAA) on July 31, 2007, for sales of 500,000 units. Since its release, the song has sold over 1,211,000 downloads in the United States. In Canada, the song entered the Canadian Hot 100 at number nine on the week ending June 2, 2007 and rose to number eight the following week. The song was certified gold by Music Canada on December 4, 2007, for sales of 40,000 units.

Internationally, "Never Again" experienced similar to less commercial success. In Australia, the song entered the Australian Singles Chart on June 10, 2007, at number five, where it peaked, and lasted with the top 10 for seven weeks after. It ended up on the Year-End Chart at number 40 and was certified gold by the Australian Recording Industry Association (ARIA) for sales of 35,000 units. In the United Kingdom, the song debuted and peaked at number nine. It stayed present in the top 75 for a total of eight weeks. In Ireland, the song peaked at number 11 in its second week on the Irish Singles Chart and lasted five more weeks on the chart.

== Music video ==
Clarkson's character's ghost haunting and following her ex-husband in the music video.

The music video, directed by Joseph Kahn, was shot in Los Angeles at the Staples Center from April 11 to 13, 2007. Kahn directed two of Clarkson's previous videos: "Behind These Hazel Eyes" and "Walk Away". The video premiered on TRL on May 1, 2007, peaked at number one on May 10, 2007, and held the top position four times. It also debuted at number 8 on VH1's V-Spot countdown and has since climbed to number 3 on V-Spot's latest episode. The music video was made available for download on the U.S. iTunes Store on May 11, 2007.

The plot involves Clarkson's character's ex-husband (Dominic Figlio) attempting to drown her in her bathtub. Then, he heads to an airport to meet his mistress, but he is wracked with guilt over what he has done. Apparitions of Clarkson are present in his car, and again at the airport to haunt him. Clarkson said the video was similar to the 2000 film What Lies Beneath because, as she put it, "You don't know if he killed me or if he's just being haunted by his conscience." Clarkson then resurfaces from the bathtub, as her ex-husband wakes up from the dream, still in his car. When he walks out, Clarkson leaves the house and drives off in the car, leaving her ex-husband behind. Clarkson also performs the song with her band in an empty white room, all wearing white clothes, during various scenes in the music video. Clarkson said the white theme was present not because she was getting "artsy-fartsy" but "because it's been ripped of innocence. Anyone who's ever been in love, when it goes bad — and sadly, everyone can relate in some manner — it just gets cold and it's hard to get past that."

== Track list ==
Digital download

1. "Never Again" – 3:37

Digital single

1. "Never Again" – 3:37
2. "Never Again" (Dave Aude remix) – 4:09

Dance vault mixes

1. "Never Again" (Dave Aude club mix) – 7:53
2. "Never Again" (Jason Nevins club mix) – 7:40
3. "Never Again" (Dave Aude mixshow) – 6:08
4. "Never Again" (Jason Nevins club mixshow) – 6:10
5. "Never Again" (Dave Aude remix) – 4:09
6. "Never Again" (Jason Nevins radio mixshow) – 6:40
7. "Never Again" (Jason Nevins club radio) – 3:54
8. "Never Again" (Jason Nevins radio mix) – 3:51
9. "Never Again" (Jason Nevins Padapella) – 2:55

== Credits and personnel ==
Credits adapted from the liner notes of My December, RCA Records, in association with 19 Recordings.

Recording and mixing

- Recorded at Mower Studios in Pasadena, California and The Village Recorder in Santa Monica, California
- Mixing at Soundtrack Studios in New York City, New York
- Mastered at Gateway Mastering in Portland, Maine

Personnel

- Songwriting – Kelly Clarkson, Jimmy Messner
- Production – David Kahne, Jason Halbert, Jimmy Messner
- Vocals – Kelly Clarkson
- Mixing – Andy Wallace
- Mixing (assistant) – Mike Schielzi
- Drums – Shawn Pelton
- Keyboard – Jason Halbert, David Kahne
- Bass – Billy Mohler
- Guitar – Jimmy Messner

== Charts ==
=== Weekly charts ===
Chart (2007)	Peak position
Australia (ARIA)	5
Austria (Ö3 Austria Top 40)	36
Belgium (Ultratip Bubbling Under Wallonia)	3
Belgium (Ultratop 50 Flanders)	44
Canada Hot 100 (Billboard)	8
Canada CHR/Top 40 (Billboard)	16
Canada Hot AC (Billboard)	5
Czech Republic Airplay (ČNS IFPI)	66
Germany (GfK)	19
Ireland (IRMA)	11
Netherlands (Dutch Top 40)	23
Netherlands (Single Top 100)	38
New Zealand (Recorded Music NZ)	20
Scotland Singles (OCC)	5
Slovakia Airplay (ČNS IFPI)	46
Sweden (Sverigetopplistan)	39
Switzerland (Schweizer Hitparade)	27
UK Singles (OCC)	9
US Billboard Hot 100	8
US Adult Pop Airplay (Billboard)	12
US Dance Club Songs (Billboard)	24
US Pop Airplay (Billboard)	20

=== Year-end charts ===
Chart (2007)	Position
Australia (ARIA)	40
US Billboard Hot 100	70
US Adult Top 40 (Billboard)	40

== Certifications ==
Region	Certification	Certified units/sales
Australia (ARIA)	Gold	35,000^{^}
Canada (Music Canada)	Gold	20,000^{*}
United States (RIAA)	Gold	1,211,000
^{*} Sales figures based on certification alone.^{^} Shipments figures based on certification alone.

== Release history ==
Country	Date	Format	Label	Ref.
United Kingdom	April 24, 2007	Digital download	RCA	
United States	April 24, 2007	Digital download	RCA	
United States	April 24, 2007	Contemporary hit radio	RCA	
United States	April 24, 2007	Hot adult contemporary	RCA	
Canada	May 1, 2007	Digital download	RCA	
Germany	May 18, 2007	Digital download	RCA	
Australia	May 26, 2007	CD	Sony BMG	
New Zealand	June 4, 2007	Digital download	RCA	
United Kingdom	June 11, 2007	CD	RCA	
Ireland	June 11, 2007	CD	RCA	
Germany	June 22, 2007	CD	RCA	
Canada	July 3, 2007	Digital download (Dance Vault Remixes)	Sony BMG	
Norway	July 3, 2007	Digital download (Dance Vault Remixes)	Sony BMG	
