= Rythm Syndicate (album) =

Studio album by Rythm Syndicate
- Released: May 28, 1991
- Recorded: 1990–1991; The Loft (Bronxville, New York) & Cherokee Studios (Los Angeles)
- Genres: Pop rock, dance-rock, new jack swing
- Length: 51:35
- Labels: Impact, MCA
- Producer: Carl Sturken and Evan Rogers

Rythm Syndicate chronology
Rythm Syndicate (1991)	Sex, Life & Love (1992)

Rythm Syndicate is the full-length debut album released by the dance-rock band Rythm Syndicate, the group formed by songwriter-producers Carl Sturken and Evan Rogers. It was released in 1991 on Impact, a subsidiary of MCA, and produced (and mostly written) by Sturken/Rogers. Three singles were released: "P.A.S.S.I.O.N." charted on the Billboard Hot 100, peaking at number 2, while the opening track "Hey Donna" peaked just outside the top 10, reaching number 13. The last single "Blinded By Love" (which is part two of the "Anatomy of a Love Affair" suite) peaked at number 76. Of the three singles released, only "P.A.S.S.I.O.N." charted in the UK, where it peaked at number 58.

In the liner notes, Rogers and Sturken thank Donny Osmond; they worked with him on his 1990 Capitol debut and its follow-up. They refer to him as "the sacred soldier", in reference to two of the songs they worked on; "Sacred Emotion" and "Soldier of Love".

== Track listing ==
- All songs written by Carl Sturken and Evan Rogers, except where noted.

No.	Title	Writer(s)	Length
1.	"Hey Donna"		4:39
2.	"P.A.S.S.I.O.N."		4:15
3.	"Anatomy Of A Love Affair (Suite): Baby Talk (Act 1...Lust); Blinded By Love (Act 2...Passion); All She Wants Is Everything (Act 3...Reality); Sometimes Love Is Not Enough (Act 4...Heartbreak)"		16:17
4.	"Pass It On"		0:58
5.	"You Really Rock Me"		4:31
6.	"Love is the Reason"		4:19
7.	"You'll Never Walk Alone"		5:56
8.	"A Shoulder To Cry On"	Sturken, Rogers, Paul "St. Paul" Peterson	5:05
9.	"Tearin' Down The Walls"		5:32
Total length:			51:35

== Personnel ==
=== Rythm Syndicate ===
- Evan Rogers: Vocal
- Carl Sturken: Guitars, Keyboards
- Mike McDonald: Guitars, Vocal Backing
- Rob Mingrino: Sax, Vocal Backing
- John "Noodle" Nevin: Bass, Vocal Backing
- Kevin Cloud: Drums, Percussion, Vocal Backing

=== Additional musicians ===
- Elisa Fiorillo: Additional Vocals (and "attitude") on "Anatomy of a Love Affair" Suite
- Paul "St. Paul" Peterson: Guitars, Organ & Vocal Backing on "A Shoulder To Cry On"
- Vincent Rogers: Trumpet on "Tearin' Down The Walls"

== Production ==
- Arranged & Produced By Carl Sturken & Evan Rogers
- Recorded & Mixed By Darroll Gustamacho, except "Hey Donna" & "Love Is The Reason", which were mixed by Steve Peck
- Additional Mix Engineers: Matt Noble, Al Hemberger & Ed Murphy; assisted by Mike Harlow & Fred Kelly
- Mastered By Steve Hall at Futuredisc (Hollywood)
- All Songs Published By Warner-Tamerlane Publishing Corp./Could Be Music/Bayjun Beat Music, except "A Shoulder To Cry On", published by Warner-Tamerlane Publishing Corp./Could Be Music/Bayjun Beat Music/EMI Music Publishing (Germany) GmbH and St. Paul Music Inc.

== Reception ==
- In a mixed (two and a half stars of a total five) review for allmusic, reviewer Ron Wynn claimed that the songs are "a series of excellent tracks, wonderfully arranged and produced," yet presented in a "faceless, generic fashion." He also said that "They're absolutely great, as long as you don't pay attention to anything except the beat and the sound."

Wynn, Ron. Rythm Syndicate: Rythm Syndicate at AllMusic. Retrieved 21 June 2013.
