= The Trouble with Love Is =

2003 single by Kelly Clarkson

Single by Kelly Clarkson

from the album Thankful
- Released: November 10, 2003
- Studio: The Hit Factory (New York City); The Record Plant (Los Angeles); The Enterprise (Burbank, California); The Loft (Bronxville, New York)
- Genre: R&B; soul
- Length: 3:42
- Label: RCA
- Songwriters: Kelly Clarkson; Evan Rogers; Carl Sturken
- Producers: Evan Rogers; Carl Sturken

Kelly Clarkson singles chronology
"Low" (2003)	"The Trouble with Love Is" (2003)	"Breakaway" (2004)

Music video
- "The Trouble with Love Is" on YouTube

"The Trouble with Love Is" is a song by American singer-songwriter Kelly Clarkson from her debut studio album, Thankful (2003). The song was written by Clarkson with its producers Evan Rogers and Carl Sturken. It was released as the third and final single from the album, being first serviced to US contemporary hit radio on November 10, 2003. "The Trouble with Love Is" is an R&B and soul ballad, with elements of gospel music in its chorus. Lyrically, the song finds Clarkson explaining how love can be joyful and sorrowful at the same time. It received mostly positive reviews from music critics, who praised it for being "soulful" and "romantic", while also praising Clarkson's vocals, comparing them to those of Mariah Carey and Beyoncé.

Commercially, while failing to match "Miss Independent" success on the charts in the United States, the song performed considerably better internationally, reaching number 11 and a gold status in Australia, while also reaching significant positions in other three countries, including Canada and the United Kingdom. The song also served to promote the Christmas romantic comedy Love Actually (2003), being featured in its accompanying soundtrack. The music video for the song was directed by Bryan Barber and released on November 7, 2003. It features scenes from the film, while Clarkson performs the track on a rooftop. Clarkson performed the track during her Independent Tour (2004) and Breakaway World Tour (2005).

== Composition and lyrics ==
"The Trouble with Love Is" was written by Kelly Clarkson with its producers Carl Sturken and Evan Rogers. Sturken was also responsible for drum programming and keyboards, while Rogers provided background vocals with Cindy Mizelle. The song was recorded at four different studios: The Hit Factory in New York City, The Record Plant in Los Angeles, The Enterprise in Burbank, California, and The Loft Recording Studio in Bronxville, New York. Its strings were recorded at a different studio: The Studio, Philadelphia. The song features drums, violins, violas, cellos, keyboards and strings in its instrumentation. According to the sheet music published at Musicnotes.com by Kobalt Music Group, the song is written in the key of F major with a tempo of 60 beats per minute in common time. The song follows a chord progression of F – A7 – B♭ – D♭ - B♭, and Clarkson's vocals span from the low-note of B♭_{3} to the high note of F_{5}. "The Trouble with Love Is" is an R&B and soul song, with elements of gospel throughout the chorus. Lyrically, it talks about the ups and downs of romance, with Clarkson singing, "Love may be a many splendored thing ... [But] it can tear you up inside/ Make your heart believe a lie."

== Release and reception ==
Following the release of "Low", which maintained her strong-hold on stateside fans, "The Trouble with Love Is" was announced as the album's third and final single, though there were fans who pant for the ballad "Anytime" to be released. It was first serviced to US mainstream radio on November 10, 2003, in the United States, and later released as a double A-side single with "Low" in the United Kingdom on November 17, 2003. It was released in the remaining countries on January 12, 2004. The song was also featured on the soundtrack of the 2003 film Love Actually.

=== Critical ===
The song received positive reviews from most music critics. Stephen Thomas Erlewine of AllMusic picked the song as one of the best tracks on the album, while Heather Phares of the same publication praised the track for "manag[ing] to be romantic, sassy, and empowering all at once, with her vocals reflecting their urban ballad surroundings." Chuck Taylor of Billboard wrote a positive review, noting that Clarkson "mines her soulful side and riffs like a sista with the gospel-drenched [track]." Caroline Sullivan of The Guardian praised the singer, writing that "[l]ike her fellow Texan Beyoncé, she has a background in the church, and it shows in the phrasing of the torchy song." Sal Cinquemani of Slant Magazine called the song a "durable soul number reminiscent of Mariah Carey's 'Vision of Love'. A writer of the website Sputnikmusic named it a "swooning, soulful, radiant song, with gospel-esque background vocals in the chorus that stands out amongst most pop music that plagues the music scene today with mediocrity."

=== Commercial ===
While failing to match "Miss Independent" in the United States, "The Trouble with Love Is" performed considerably better internationally. In Australia, the song debuted at number 12 on February 22, 2004, while the next week it reached a peak of number 11 on the ARIA Charts week of February 29, 2004, remaining at the peak position for a further week. It matched the same peak position of the previous single, "Low", and ultimately, the song was certified gold by the Australian Recording Industry Association for selling over 35,000 copies. In Netherlands, the song peaked higher than her previous single, "Miss Independent", debuting at number 81, on December 27, 2003, and reaching number 26, on January 24, 2004. In Switzerland, the song became Clarkson's lowest charting-single of her career, peaking at number 62. In the United States, "The Trouble with Love Is" did not chart on the Billboard Hot 100 chart, but made its appearance on three Billboard component charts: the Top 40 Mainstream chart, where it peaked at number 22, the Adult Top 40, reaching number 31, and the Top 40 Tracks, where it reached number 36. On the Canadian Hot 100, the song performed significantly at number 25.

== Music video ==
The music video for the song was directed by Bryan Barber and premiered on November 7, 2003, on TRL. The video features Clarkson performing the track on a rooftop in downtown Los Angeles, with people watching Love Actually on a rooftop adjacent to the one Clarkson's on. As noted by MTV News' Corey Moss, "along with the high-altitude shots, Barber also created several vignettes showing kids dealing with troubled relationships, which [were] interspersed with the performance footage. The scenes [took] place in the rooms of the building Kelly is performing on and include[s] a girl fighting for attention from her video-game addict boyfriend and another girl climbing on the fire escape after arguing with her mother."

== Live performances ==
Clarkson promoted the song with a handful of live performances, including The Ellen Show, Pop Idol, Today Live on Air, AOL Music, Smile and Popworld. Clarkson also performed the track on her Independent Tour (2004), Behind These Hazel Eyes Tour and last on The Breakaway Tour (2005–2006). In 2012, on her Stronger Tour, Clarkson performed the track on a medley with "Walk Away", "How I Feel" and "I Want You".

== Track listings ==
UK CD single ("Low" / "The Trouble with Love Is")

1. "Low" (video mix) – 3:29
2. "The Trouble with Love Is" – 3:42
3. "Respect" – 2:15
4. "Low" (music video) – 3:28

European CD single

1. "The Trouble with Love Is" – 3:42
2. "(You Make Me Feel Like A) Natural Woman" – 2:26
3. "A Moment Like This" – 3:49

Australian CD single

1. "The Trouble with Love Is" – 3:42
2. "The Trouble with Love Is" (MaUVe classic vocal mix) – 8:27
3. "The Trouble with Love Is" (Bimbo Jones dub) – 6:06

== Credits and personnel ==
Credits are adapted from the liner notes of Thankful.

Recording

- Recorded at The Hit Factory (New York City), The Record Plant (Los Angeles), The Enterprise (Burbank, California), and The Loft Recording Studio (Bronxville, New York)
- Strings recorded at The Studio (Philadelphia, Pennsylvania)
- Mixed at The Hit Factory (New York City)

Personnel

- Kelly Clarkson – vocals, writing
- Carl Sturken – writing, production, drum programming, keyboards
- Evan Rogers – writing, production, background vocals
- Larry Gold – strings arrangement, conductor
- Steve Ferrera – drums
- Cindy Mizelle – background vocals
- James Cooper, III – cellos
- Jennie Lorenzo – cellos
- Andrea Derby – production coordination
- Al Hemberger – engineering
- J.D. Andrew – engineering
- Rich Balmer – engineering
- Dan Bucchi – engineering assistant
- Jun Ishizeki – engineering assistant
- Gordon Goss – engineering assistant
- Jeff Chestek – strings engineering
- Tony Maserati – mixing
- Brendan Kuntz – mixing assistant
- Matt Snedecor – mixing assistant
- Alexandra Leem – viola
- Peter Nocella – viola
- Charlene Kwas – violin
- Charles Parker Jr. – violin
- Emma Kummrow – violin
- Gregory Teperman – violin
- Igor Szwec – violin

== Charts ==
=== Weekly charts ===
Chart (2003–2004)	Peak position
Australia (ARIA)	11
Germany (GfK)	42
Netherlands (Dutch Top 40)	32
Netherlands (Single Top 100)	26
Scottish Singles Sales (Official Charts) with "Low"	36
Switzerland (Schweizer Hitparade)	62
UK Singles (Official Charts) with "Low"	35
US Adult Pop Airplay (Billboard)	31
US Pop Airplay (Billboard)	22
US Top 40 Tracks (Billboard)	36

=== Year-end charts ===
Chart (2004)	Position
Australia (ARIA)	92
US Mainstream Top 40 (Billboard)	93

== Certifications ==
Region	Certification	Certified units/sales
Australia (ARIA)	Gold	35,000^{^}
^{^} Shipments figures based on certification alone.

== Release history ==
Region	Date	Format(s)	Label(s)	Ref.
United States	November 10, 2003	Contemporary hit; hot adult contemporary radio	RCA	
United Kingdom	November 17, 2003	CD single	RCA	
Germany	January 12, 2004	CD single	RCA; Sony Music	
United Kingdom	January 12, 2004	Digital download	19	
Europe	January 12, 2004	Digital download	19	
Greece	January 12, 2004	Digital download	19	
France	January 12, 2004	Digital download	19	
Ireland	January 12, 2004	Digital download	19	
Italy	January 12, 2004	Digital download	19	
Sweden	January 12, 2004	Digital download	19	
Australia	February 9, 2004	CD single	RCA; 19	
