= Low (Kelly Clarkson song) =

2003 single by Kelly Clarkson

Single by Kelly Clarkson

from the album Thankful
- Released: August 3, 2003
- Studio: Blue Iron Gate (Santa Monica, California); Westlake (Hollywood, California)
- Genre: Pop
- Length: 3:28
- Label: RCA
- Songwriter: Jimmy Harry
- Producer: Clif Magness

Kelly Clarkson singles chronology
"Miss Independent" (2003)	"Low" (2003)	"The Trouble with Love Is" (2003)

Music video
- "Low" on YouTube

"Low" is a song by American singer-songwriter Kelly Clarkson from her debut album, Thankful (2003). The song was written by Jimmy Harry and produced by Clif Magness. It was released as the album's second official single, on August 3, 2003, while it was also released as a double A-side single with "The Trouble with Love Is" in the United Kingdom. This release reached only number 35, but "Low" was more successful in Australia and Canada, reaching numbers 11 and two, respectively, while also peaking at number 58 in the United States. The song received favorable reviews from music critics who complimented her vocals and the song's lyrics. On March 5, 2013, Billboard ranked the song at number 90 in its list of "Top 100 American Idol Hits of All Time".

== Background and release ==
After some encouragement from friends, Jimmy Harry, the songwriter of "Low", asked singer-songwriter Danielle Brisebois to sing the demo and offered it to Britney Spears and Kylie Minogue, but "it really wasn’t a good fit for what they were doing," said the songwriter. The song eventually found its way to Kelly, which initially filled Jimmy with apprehension. "I was a bit conflicted about Kelly doing the song," he admits. "Mostly because it seemed like they were going for a Celine Dion/Mariah Carey sort of vibe with her and I wasn’t sure how it was going to make sense with what I had heard from the rest of the record. I liked the version she cut a lot. I was expecting it to be a bit more pop than the way Clif Magness produced it."

After reaching number nine on the US Billboard Hot 100 chart with "Miss Independent", Clarkson wasn't immediately convinced that "Low" should be a single. Other contenders, and possible third singles, were "Just Missed the Train," "The Trouble with Love Is" and "You Thought Wrong," a duet with Tamyra Gray. Eventually, "Low" was released as the second single on August 3, 2003, and in the United Kingdom, the song was released as a double A-side single with "The Trouble With Love Is". Jimmy Harry was surprised when the song was chosen to be a single, "I think it was a big leap of faith to segue from ‘Miss Independent’ to ‘Low’ because the production and lyrical content were so different,' he continues. I was really surprised when I learned it was going to be the second single. I knew it was a great song. I'm happy it saw the light of day."

== Composition and lyrics ==
"Low" was written by Jimmy Harry and produced by Cliff Magness, who also arranged and engineered the track. The midtempo country-flavored track finds the singer reflecting on a broken relationship. "It's cool you didn't want me/ Sometimes you can't go back/ But why'd you have to go and make a mess like that?" she sings before asking in the chorus: "Have you ever been low? Have you ever had a friend that let you down so?". Harry has said that "Low" "was a really personal song for me. I wrote it and wasn’t quite sure what to do with it because it was a pretty brutal lyric and I felt it wasn’t something a lot of pop artists would want to do."

== Critical reception ==
Henry Goldblatt of Entertainment Weekly praised the vocal performance and wrote that Kelly owns country-ish "Low." Arion Berger of Rolling Stone wrote that "the album's producers jam Clarkson into the stilettos of MTV sexpots like Faith Hill in 'Low'."" Slant Magazine's editor Sal Cinquemani called it an "adult-skewed power ballad" "overwrought". Elysa Gardner of USA Today editor Elysa Gardner praised "Clarkson's singing", writing that it "can take on a sensual raspiness more evocative of blues-influenced rock artists, so that wistful but driving numbers such as 'Low' and 'Just Missed the Train' sound more authoritative than you might expect." Sputnikmusic praised "Miss Independent" and "Low", calling them "both huge singles that drove the album towards that platinum mark rather quickly."

== Chart performance ==
After the success of the previous singles, "A Moment Like This" and "Miss Independent", "Low" wasn't as successful as the last two singles. In the United States, "Low" was a mediocre hit, peaking at number 58 on the Billboard Hot 100 chart. It also appeared on several airplay charts, including the Top 40 Tracks ranking, and peaked at number 14 on the Top 40 Mainstream chart. In the United Kingdom, "Low" was released as a double A-side single with "The Trouble with Love Is", where it peaked at number 35.

The song proved to be more successful in Australia, debuting and peaking at number 11, on November 9, 2003, and receiving a gold certification in 2004. In Canada, after debuting at number 58 on the Canadian Singles Chart, the song climbed up the listing. Eight weeks later, "Low" entered the top 10, and 11 weeks following its debut, the song reached the number-two position. On March 5, 2013, Billboard ranked the song at number 90 on its list of "Top 100 American Idol Hits of All Time".

== Music video ==
The accompanying music video was directed by Antti Jokinen, who also directed Clarkson's "A Moment Like This" and "Before Your Love" videos. Jokinen explained that he wanted Clarkson "to rock and kick ass a little bit more than she normally does." He also added that, "I listened to the lyrics and there were elements of lost love and feeling low, and there are some scenes directly from that, however they are portrayed in more metaphoric terms." About the video' storyline, J. said, "I had Thelma & Louise in mind, but I don't think we wanted her to drive over the cliff." "I already thought it was kind of risky, because it shows such a different attitude than she normally portrays. She pulled it off and it was more about fun. It's more tongue-in-cheek than it is a serious, like, 'You messed me over and now I'm going to drive your car off a cliff.'"

=== Synopsis ===
The video opens with Clarkson cruising on a desert highway in a Land Rover Series II that viewers later learn belongs to an old flame. While driving, she envisions the guy driving by and holding up his number on a piece of paper, but she sings, "No, I don't need your number." Eventually, after cutting back from footage of her performing at a drive-in theater (with psychedelic imagery on the big screen), the video shows Clarkson pulling off the road near the edge of a cliff. Then, she stops with the front wheels just over the edge. She gets out, emotionless, and walks away, but not before kicking the bumper and sending the vehicle tumbling.

== Track listings ==
Canadian CD single

1. "Low" (radio edit) – 3:29
2. "Miss Independent" (MaUVe full vocal mix) – 7:55

UK CD single ("Low" / "The Trouble with Love Is")

1. "Low"
2. "The Trouble with Love Is" – 3:42
3. "Respect"
4. "Low" (music video) – 3:28

Australian CD single

1. "Low" (album version) – 3:29
2. "Miss Independent" (Shanghai Surprise club mix) – 7:33
3. "Miss Independent" (MaUVe mix) – 7:55
4. "Miss Independent" (Junior Vasquez Tribal) – 9:23

== Charts ==
=== Weekly charts ===
Chart (2003–2004)	Peak position
Australia (ARIA)	11
Canada (Nielsen SoundScan)	2
Scottish Singles Sales (Official Charts) with "The Trouble with Love Is"	36
UK Singles (Official Charts) with "The Trouble with Love Is"	35
US Billboard Hot 100	58
US Pop Airplay (Billboard)	14
US Top 40 Tracks (Billboard)	24

=== Year-end charts ===
Chart (2003)	Position
US Mainstream Top 40 (Billboard)	78

== Certifications ==
Region	Certification	Certified units/sales
Australia (ARIA)	Gold	35,000^{^}
^{^} Shipments figures based on certification alone.

== Release history ==
Region	Date	Format	Label	Catalog	Ref.
United States	August 3, 2003	Mainstream radio	RCA	—N/a	
Australia	October 27, 2003	CD single	BMG Australia	82876573322	
United Kingdom	November 17, 2003	CD single	RCA	B0000DIGKW	
