= Independent Tour =

2004 concert tour by Clay Aiken and Kelly Clarkson

- Tour by Clay Aiken and Kelly Clarkson
- Tour Book Cover
- Associated album: Measure of a Man; Thankful
- Start date: February 24, 2004
- End date: April 16, 2004
- Legs: 1
- No. of shows: 32
Clay Aiken chronology
American Idols LIVE! Tour 2003 (2003)	Independent Tour (2004)	Clay Aiken: Live in Concert (2004)
Kelly Clarkson chronology
Kelly Clarkson in Concert (2003)	Independent Tour (2004)	The Breakaway Tour (2005–06)

The Independent Tour was a co-headlining tour by American recording artists Kelly Clarkson and Clay Aiken. The tour supported their debut albums, Thankful (2003) and Measure of a Man (2003). The tour only reached the United States during the winter and spring of 2004. Clarkson and Aiken performed individual shows, alternating the opening and closing positions every other city, before joining in a duet for an encore after the closing artist's set. Many critics described the tour as the PG version of The Justified & Stripped Tour in 2003. The tour placed 58th in Pollstar's annual "Top 100 Tours", earning over ten million dollars with 31 shows.

== Background ==
Clarkson announced the tour via her official website on January 7, 2004. She wrote:

"hey what's up guys! I have some very exciting news! clay aiken and I have decided to team up and co-headline a US tour together. we’re really pumped about it and can’t wait to see y’all there. we’ll be announcing the exact tour dates soon but for now I wanted to give you guys the scoop first. more info to come. have a super day! God bless kelly :)"

== Opening act ==
- The Beu Sisters

== Setlist ==
Aiken
1. "Kyrie"
2. "Perfect Day"
3. "I Will Carry You"
4. "All About Love"
5. "No More Sad Songs"
6. "When You Say You Love Me"
7. "Without You" (Badfinger cover)
8. "Invisible"
9. "Run to Me"
10. Medley: "Measure of a Man" / "Fields of Gold" / "Carolina in My Mind" (Sting & James Taylor cover)
11. "When I Need You"

Encore

12. "When Doves Cry"
13. "The Way"
Clarkson
1. "Low"
2. "What's Up Lonely"
3. "The Trouble with Love Is"
4. "Just Missed the Train"
5. "Some Kind of Miracle"
6. "Beautiful Disaster"
7. "Stuff Like That There" (Betty Hutton cover)
8. "Why Haven't I Heard from You" (Reba McEntire cover)
9. "You Thought Wrong"
10. "The Bounce (The Luv)"
11. "Timeless"
12. "Anytime"
13. "Thankful"

Encore

14. "Miss Independent"
15. "A Moment Like This"
16. "Open Arms"

Notes

- During the concert in Grand Prairie, Clarkson performed "You Thought Wrong" with Tamyra Gray.

== Tour dates ==
Date	City (All U.S.)	Venue	Opening act(s)	Attendance	Revenue
February 24, 2004	Charlotte	Charlotte Coliseum	The Beu Sisters	8,657 / 8,959	$367,875
February 25, 2004	Duluth	Arena at Gwinnett Center	The Beu Sisters	9,166 / 9,636	$417,642
February 27, 2004	Tampa	St. Pete Times Forum	The Beu Sisters	7,198 / 7,829	$323,247
February 28, 2004	Miami	American Airlines Arena	The Beu Sisters	5,395 / 6,204	$245,818
March 1, 2004	Raleigh	RBC Center	The Beu Sisters	13,538 / 13,538	$586,230
March 2, 2004	Philadelphia	Liacouras Center	The Beu Sisters	7,934 / 9,229	$368,378
March 4, 2004	Uniondale	Nassau Veterans Memorial Coliseum	The Beu Sisters	12,501 / 12,769	$565,198
March 5, 2004	Washington, D.C.	MCI Center	The Beu Sisters	10,627 / 12,102	$458,128
March 7, 2004	Wilkes-Barre	Wachovia Arena	The Beu Sisters	7,660 / 7,898	$321,470
March 8, 2004	Worcester	Worcester Centrum Centre	The Beu Sisters	10,408 / 10,408	$448,170
March 10, 2004	Columbus	Value City Arena	The Beu Sisters	9,279 / 11,270	$432,283
March 11, 2004	Detroit	Joe Louis Arena	The Beu Sisters	9,408 / 11,521	$431,584
March 13, 2004	Winston-Salem	LJVM Coliseum	The Beu Sisters	9,829 / 9,829	$438,918
March 16, 2004^{[A]}	Houston	Reliant Stadium	The Beu Sisters	—N/a	—N/a
March 17, 2004^{[B]}	Austin	Luedecke Arena	The Beu Sisters	—N/a	—N/a
March 19, 2004	Grand Prairie	NextStage at Grand Prairie	The Beu Sisters	6,094 / 6,094	$287,306
March 21, 2004	St. Louis	Savvis Center	The Beu Sisters	8,195 / 10,298	$375,595
March 22, 2004	Chicago	United Center	The Beu Sisters	10,002 / 10,724	$436,250
March 24, 2004	Omaha	Qwest Center	The Beu Sisters	7,081 / 7,526	$320,967
March 26, 2004	Salt Lake City	Delta Center	The Beu Sisters	—N/a	—N/a
March 27, 2004	Las Vegas	Thomas & Mack Center	The Beu Sisters	—N/a	—N/a
March 30, 2004	San Diego	Cox Arena	The Beu Sisters	—N/a	—N/a
March 31, 2004	Sacramento	ARCO Arena	The Beu Sisters	9,123 / 10,442	$418,330
April 2, 2004	Glendale	Glendale Arena	The Beu Sisters	7,549 / 8,016	$365,943
April 3, 2004	Anaheim	Arrowhead Pond of Anaheim	The Beu Sisters	9,645 / 11,505	$427,555
April 5, 2004	Los Angeles	Staples Center	The Beu Sisters	8,131 / 9,388	$384,894
April 6, 2004	San Jose	HP Pavilion at San Jose	The Beu Sisters	8,315 / 12,131	$372,295
April 8, 2004	Seattle	KeyArena	The Beu Sisters	6,921 / 8,910	$304,625
April 9, 2004	Spokane	Spokane Veterans Memorial Arena	The Beu Sisters	—N/a	—N/a
April 13, 2004	Denver	Pepsi Center	The Beu Sisters	5,960 / 10,080	$288,580
April 15, 2004	Kansas City	Kemper Arena	The Beu Sisters	6,666 / 10,557	$290,496
April 16, 2004	Saint Paul	Xcel Energy Center	The Beu Sisters	10,238 / 10,238	$464,227
Total				225,520 / 257,101 (88%)	$10,142,004

Festivals and other miscellaneous performances
^{A} This concert was a part of the "Spring Break Stampede"
^{B} This concert was a part of the "Star of Texas Fair and Rodeo"

- Only Clarkson performed at these two events
