= Love Games (album) =

Studio album by Evan Rogers
- Released: 1985
- Recorded: 1984–1985
- Genre: Dance-rock, dance-pop, soul
- Length: 41:09
- Label: RCA
- Producer: Carl Sturken and Evan Rogers

Evan Rogers chronology
Love Games (1985)	Faces of Love (1989)

Love Games is the debut album by Evan Rogers, singer-songwriter-producer and part of the duo of Carl Sturken and Evan Rogers. In addition to Carl Sturken's contributions, John Nevin appears on bass, who also returned in 1991 as part of the Sturken/Rogers R&B/dance-rock band Rythm Syndicate.

== Track listing ==
- All songs written by Evan Rogers and Carl Sturken (Bayjun Beat/MCA Music Publishing), except where noted.
1. "Hold On" 5:18
2. "Private Joy" (Prince; Controversy Music) 5:15
3. "Full-Time Lover" 5:38
4. "Sweet 16" 5:23
5. "Don't Jump to Conclusions" 4:47
6. "One-Track Mind" 5:04
7. "I'll Break the Rules for You" 4:21
8. "Be Mine Tonight" 5:07

== Personnel ==
- Evan Rogers: Drum Programming, Main Vocal
- Carl Sturken: Guitars, Keyboards, Drum Programming, Vocal Backing
- Kennan Keating, Bob Palmieri, Paul Pesco: Guitars
- Charlie Roth, Mary Kessler, Robbie Kilgore: Keyboards
- John Nevin, Tony Bridges: Bass
- Roger Byam: Saxophone

== Production ==
- Arranged and produced by Carl Sturken and Evan Rogers
- Recorded by Bob Rosa with assistance by Acar S. Key, Cathy Gazzo, Mike Nicoletti, Steve Pecorella and Kennan Keating
- Mixed by Chris Lord-Alge
