= Sex, Life & Love =

Studio album by Rythm Syndicate
- Released: September 1, 1992
- Recorded: February 10–April 23, 1992; The Loft (Bronxville, New York)
- Genre: Dance-rock, R&B, new jack swing
- Length: 61:04
- Label: Impact, MCA
- Producer: Carl Sturken and Evan Rogers for Syndicated Rythm Productions

Rythm Syndicate chronology
Rythm Syndicate (1991)	Sex, Life & Love (1992)

Sex, Life & Love is the second full-length studio disc from Rythm Syndicate, the dance-rock band founded by songwriter/producers Carl Sturken & Evan Rogers. Released in 1992 (with the name changed to "RHYTHM Syndicate"), the disc features much of the same personnel, both in the band and in the recording, as their debut. With the loss of former guitarist Mike McDonald, multi-instrumentalist Ron Skies was called in to handle guitars as well.

Released during the 1992 L.A. riots, the back cover features the plea "Pray for peace, justice, and an end to racism in L.A., America and the world."

The album features hypersexual lyrics and titles, with some being "Just for the Sex", "Can I Get Naked with You" and "I Wanna Make Love to You".

It failed to chart in America, and only one single aired; "I Wanna Make Love to You". Two songs ("Sexitivity" and "I Wanna Make Love to You") were used in the soundtrack of the 1992 John Landis movie Innocent Blood. After the release, both Sturken & Rogers returned to production and songwriting work for other artists.

== Track listing ==
- All songs written by Carl Sturken and Evan Rogers, except where noted.

No.	Title	Writer(s)	Length
1.	"Just for the Sex"		5:22
2.	"I Wanna Make Love to You"		4:12
3.	"Can I Get Naked with You"		6:37
4.	"Living on the Frontline"	Sturken, Rogers, Kevin Cloud	5:07
5.	"Never Never Girl"		6:58
6.	"Sexitivity"		5:21
7.	"Somebody Call A Doctor"		6:54
8.	"Little Pussycat"	Sturken, Rogers, Cloud	5:44
9.	"The Story of Tracy and Paul"		6:20
10.	"Forever in Love"		6:04
11.	"All You Non-Believers"	Sturken, Rogers, Cloud, John Nevin	2:02

== Personnel ==
Rythm Syndicate

- Evan Rogers - vocals and percussion
- Carl Sturken - guitars, keyboards and percussion
- Ron Skies - guitars, keyboards, violin, snare drum and vocals
- John "Noodle" Nevin - bass, flute, sleigh bells and snare drum
- Rob Mingrino - saxophone, flute and vocals
- Kevin Cloud - drums and percussion

Additional personnel

- Tony Lee: second guitar solo (track 11)

Production

- Arranged & produced by Carl Sturken & Evan Rogers
- Recorded & mixed by Daroll Gustamacho; additional recording by Steve Heinke, with assistance from Ed Murphy
- Additional mixing by Martin Horenburg & Earl "Duke" Martin
- Mastered by Steve Hall (Future Disc, Hollywood)
