= List of Billboard Mainstream Top 40 number-one songs of 2003 =

This is a list of the U.S. Billboard magazine Mainstream Top 40 number-one songs of 2003.

During 2003, a total of 16 singles hit number-one on the charts.

== Chart history ==
Issue date	Song	Artist(s)	Ref
January 4	"Lose Yourself"	Eminem	
January 11	"Beautiful"	Christina Aguilera	
January 18	"Beautiful"	Christina Aguilera	
January 25	"Beautiful"	Christina Aguilera	
February 1	"Beautiful"	Christina Aguilera	
February 8	"I'm with You"	Avril Lavigne	
February 15	"I'm with You"	Avril Lavigne	
February 22	"I'm with You"	Avril Lavigne	
March 1	"I'm with You"	Avril Lavigne	
March 8	"All I Have"	Jennifer Lopez featuring LL Cool J	
March 15	"All I Have"	Jennifer Lopez featuring LL Cool J	
March 22	"All I Have"	Jennifer Lopez featuring LL Cool J	
March 29	"All I Have"	Jennifer Lopez featuring LL Cool J	
April 5	"In da Club"	50 Cent	
April 12	"In da Club"	50 Cent	
April 19	"In da Club"	50 Cent	
April 26	"In da Club"	50 Cent	
May 3	"When I'm Gone"	3 Doors Down	
May 10	"Ignition"	R. Kelly	
May 17	"Rock Your Body"	Justin Timberlake	
May 24	"Rock Your Body"	Justin Timberlake	
May 31	"Rock Your Body"	Justin Timberlake	
June 7	"Rock Your Body"	Justin Timberlake	
June 14	"Bring Me to Life"	Evanescence featuring Paul McCoy	
June 21	"Bring Me to Life"	Evanescence featuring Paul McCoy	
June 28	"Miss Independent"	Kelly Clarkson	
July 5	"Miss Independent"	Kelly Clarkson	
July 12	"Miss Independent"	Kelly Clarkson	
July 19	"Miss Independent"	Kelly Clarkson	
July 26	"Miss Independent"	Kelly Clarkson	
August 2	"Miss Independent"	Kelly Clarkson	
August 9	"Where Is the Love?"	The Black Eyed Peas	
August 16	"Crazy in Love"	Beyoncé featuring Jay-Z	
August 23	"Where Is the Love?"	The Black Eyed Peas	
August 30	"Where Is the Love?"	The Black Eyed Peas	
September 6	"Where Is the Love?"	The Black Eyed Peas	
September 13	"Where Is the Love?"	The Black Eyed Peas	
September 20	"Where Is the Love?"	The Black Eyed Peas	
September 27	"Where Is the Love?"	The Black Eyed Peas	
October 4	"Shake Ya Tailfeather"	Nelly, P. Diddy and Murphy Lee	
October 11	"Shake Ya Tailfeather"	Nelly, P. Diddy and Murphy Lee	
October 18	"Shake Ya Tailfeather"	Nelly, P. Diddy and Murphy Lee	
October 25	"Here Without You"	3 Doors Down	
November 1	"Here Without You"	3 Doors Down	
November 8	"Baby Boy"	Beyoncé featuring Sean Paul	
November 15	"Here Without You"	3 Doors Down	
November 22	"Here Without You"	3 Doors Down	
November 29	"Here Without You"	3 Doors Down	
December 6	"Here Without You"	3 Doors Down	
December 13	"Hey Ya!"	OutKast	
December 20	"Hey Ya!"	OutKast	
December 27	"Hey Ya!"	OutKast	

== See also ==
- 2003 in music
