= Thankful (Kelly Clarkson album) =

Studio album by Kelly Clarkson
- Released: April 15, 2003
- Recorded: 2002–2003
- Studios: The Loft Recording Studios (Bronxville, NY); The Hit Factory (New York, NY); The Record Plant (Los Angeles, CA); The Enterprise (Burbank, CA); The Studio (Philadelphia, PA); Sound Gallery Studios (Los Angeles, CA); Blue Iron Gate Studio (Santa Monica, CA); Westlake Recording Studios (Hollywood, CA); HP Studios (Los Angeles, CA); Capitol Studios (Los Angeles, CA); The Underlab (Los Angeles, CA); Homesite 13 (Los Angeles, CA); Larrabee West Studios (Los Angeles, CA); Rokstone Studios (London, England); The Gentleman's Club (Miami Beach, FL)
- Genres: Pop; R&B
- Length: 45:31
- Labels: RCA; 19; S
- Producers: Babyface; Louis Biancaniello; Desmond Child; Cathy Dennis; Steve Ferrera; Rhett Lawrence; Steve Mac; Clif Magness; Evan Rogers; Carl Sturken; The Underdogs; Sam Watters; Matthew Wilder

Kelly Clarkson chronology
Thankful (2003)	Breakaway (2004)

Singles from Thankful
- 1. "Miss Independent" Released: April 10, 2003; 2. "Low" Released: August 3, 2003; 3. "The Trouble with Love Is" Released: November 10, 2003

Thankful is the debut studio album by American singer Kelly Clarkson, released in the United States by RCA Records on April 15, 2003, followed by a worldwide release in July 2003. After winning the first season of reality singing contest American Idol in September 2002, Clarkson began recording her debut, collaborating with a variety of writers and producers. Originally slated for November 2002, its release was delayed due to her busy schedule and the search for material that fit her style. By the time it arrived, over six months had passed since her coronation song "A Moment Like This" reached number one.

Upon its release, Thankful received mixed reviews, with critics lauding Clarkson's vocal talent and versatility but criticizing the album as overproduced, formulaic, and closely tied to the American Idol machine. Commercially, the album was a success, debuting at number one in the United States with first week sales of 297,000 copies and selling 2.8 million copies to date. It also performed moderately well internationally, reaching the top five or top twenty in several countries and earning multiple Gold and Platinum certifications, with estimated worldwide sales of 4.5 million copies.

The album's lead single, "Miss Independent," became Clarkson's first international hit, reaching the top ten in five countries and earning a Gold certification from the Recording Industry Association of America (RIAA), as well as her first Grammy nomination for Best Female Pop Vocal Performance. It was followed by the moderately successful singles "Low" and "The Trouble with Love Is"; the latter featured on the soundtrack of the romantic comedy film Love Actually (2003). To support Thankful, Clarkson and Idol second season runner-up Clay Aiken co-headlined the 2004 Independent Tour throughout the US.

== Background ==
After high school, Clarkson declined scholarships to the University of Texas at Austin, University of North Texas, and Berklee College of Music, choosing instead to record demos and seek a record deal independently. She turned down offers from Jive Records and Interscope Records, believing they would pigeonhole her as a bubblegum pop act. In 2001, she moved to Los Angeles, appearing as an extra on shows like Sabrina, the Teenage Witch and Dharma & Greg, and recorded demo tracks with Gerry Goffin to attract label interest. Despite her efforts, she was repeatedly rejected for sounding "too black," and after financial and personal setbacks, she returned to her Texas hometown.

Upon returning to Burleson, Clarkson was encouraged by friends to audition for the first season of the reality television series American Idol: The Search for a Superstar in May 2002. Although she received a "golden ticket" to the Hollywood rounds in the premiere, Clarkson first appeared in the second episode. She won the competition on September 4, 2002, at the Kodak Theatre, receiving 58% of the votes against runner-up Justin Guarini. Following her victory, Clarkson signed with RCA Records, 19 Recordings, and S Records under the guidance of talent manager Simon Fuller and music executive Clive Davis. On September 17, 2002, she released her debut double-A-side single, "Before Your Love"/"A Moment Like This," performed during the season finale. It debuted at number 60 on the US Billboard Hot 100, eventually ascending to number one and breaking a 38-year-old record previously held by The Beatles for the largest jump to the top spot. It went on to become the best-selling single of 2002 in the US.

== Writing and recording ==
Given the power of her voice, Davis, along with A&R executives Steve Ferrara and Keith Naftaly, sought to move Clarkson beyond her association with American Idol, broaden her songwriting and production credits, and establish her identity as an artist independent of the show, steering her music toward a "pop-rock direction." They organized sessions for Clarkson to write and record with a range of established songwriters and producers on her debut album, including Babyface, Louis Biancaniello, Desmond Child, Cathy Dennis, Rhett Lawrence, Steve Mac, and Clif Magness, as well as duos Carl Sturken and Evan Rogers and The Underdogs, although the involvement of multiple R&B producers contributed to a less cohesive sound, with the album also incorporating elements of R&B and gospel. Davis and his team additionally reviewed and selected pre-existing songs that were submitted to the label.

Largely new to the industry and dependent on label executives, Clarkson, who co-wrote four of the album's twelve tracks, felt increasingly frustrated and disillusioned by her limited creative control and the number of decision-makers involved during the album's production. As a result, she had to strongly advocate for the inclusion of several up-tempo tracks, as the label preferred that she record ballads. In addition to its abundance of original material, she also recorded four cover songs for Thankful, including "(You Make Me Feel Like) A Natural Woman" originally by Aretha Franklin, "Some Kind of Miracle" originally sung by Puff Johnson, "Anytime" by Mary Griffin and "Just Missed the Train" by Trine Rein. Two songs originally on the album, "Trace of Gold" and "Today for Me", written by Stephanie Saraco, were replaced just before the album release by "Anytime" and "A Moment Like This". Named after the album's title track, which was produced by The Underdogs and Babyface, Clarkson commented on the album's title: "It came from interviews and everybody asking me if I could wrap up in one year, in one word what would it be? I was like, Thankful."

== Promotion ==
The release of the album was preceded by lead single "Miss Independent." Originally titled "Miss Independence" and produced for Christina Aguilera's second album Stripped (2002), the track was left unfinished and later passed to Davis for Thankful. Clarkson rewrote the song with Rhett Lawrence, retitled it "Miss Independent," and fought to include it on the album. Eventually selected as a single, it was released to mainstream radio in the United States by RCA Records on April 10, 2003, five days ahead of Thankful's release. A major commercial success, reaching the US top 10 on the Billboard Hot 100, topping the Mainstream Top 40 for six weeks, earning a Gold certification and over one million US digital sales, while also becoming Clarkson's first international hit with top-10 peaks in Australia, the UK, and several European countries.

"Low" was released as the album's second single in August 2003 across Australia and North America. Written by Jimmy Harry, the song was initially offered to Britney Spears and Kylie Minogue before being recorded by Clarkson; although Harry was initially apprehensive about her taking on the track, he ultimately praised her version. Although Clarkson was not immediately convinced that "Low" should be a single, it achieved greater success in Australia and Canada, reaching numbers 11 and two, respectively, while also charting at number 58 in the United States. Elsewhere, "Low" was released as a double A-side single with "The Trouble with Love Is." Davis persuaded director Richard Curtis to include "The Trouble with Love Is" on the soundtrack of his Christmas comedy Love Actually (2003). Although Curtis was initially hesitant to include a song by an American Idol contestant, he changed his mind upon hearing it. It fared better internationally, peaking at number 11 and earning Gold certification in Australia, reaching number 26 in the Netherlands, and charting modestly in Canada, while in the US it missed the Billboard Hot 100. "Just Missed the Train" and "You Thought Wrong" had been planned for possible single releases, but after the underperformance of "Low" and "The Trouble with Love Is", they were canceled.

== Critical reception ==
Professional ratings
Aggregate scores
Source	Rating
Metacritic	62/100
Review scores
Source	Rating
AllMusic	4/5 stars
E! Online	B
Entertainment Weekly	B+
The Guardian	3/5 stars
Q	1/5 stars
Rolling Stone	3/5 stars
Slant Magazine	2.5/5 stars
USA Today	2.5/4 stars

At the time of its release, Thankful drew mixed reactions, with reviewers applauding Clarkson's strong, versatile vocals while criticizing the album as overproduced and overly shaped by the American Idol format. In the years since, critical opinion has somewhat softened. Critics agreed on Clarkson's talent as a vocalist but found the album's musical direction to be heavily manufactured and overproduced. On Metacritic, a website that compiles various reviews, the album received a score of 62/100 based on 7 reviews, indicating generally favorable reviews. AllMusic editor Stephen Thomas Erlewine viewed Thankful as a surprisingly successful debut. He praised the album for presenting Kelly Clarkson as youthful, versatile, and engaging, balancing dance-pop and ballads while showcasing her vocal range and personality. Though not groundbreaking, he considered it an enjoyable, well-crafted mainstream pop record that exceeded expectations for an Idol winner.

Henry Goldenblatt from Entertainment Weekly, while expressing reservations about the album's heavily collaborative process, praised Clarkson's vocal ability, writing that she "glides through octaves with the masterful control of someone who's been doing this for decades," while Caroline Sullivan from The Guardian concluded: "Whatever you think of Thankful's mix of R&B and trashy slow ballads [...] you can't deny that Clarkson is potential pop royalty." Rolling Stone critic Arion Berger awarded the album three out of five stars, praising Clarkson's vocal ability while criticizing the record's manufactured feel. He wrote that "[her] high notes are sweet and pillowy, her growl is bone-shaking and sexy, and her midrange is amazingly confident," though he noted that her career remained closely tied to the American Idol brand. Rob O'Connor of Yahoo! LAUNCH described Thankful as meeting expectations for an American Idol debut, citing its melodramatic pop sensibilities and emphasis on vocal showmanship, drawing comparisons to artists such as Mariah Carey and Whitney Houston.

Slant Magazine's Sal Cinquemani argued that Thankful exposes the limitations of the American Idol machine, presenting Clarkson as a polished product rather than a fully formed artist. While he acknowledged her immense vocal talent and moments of strength on select tracks, he felt the album was overly calculated, adult-leaning, and weighed down by commercial excess rather than genuine artistic development. Similarly, Elysa Gardner from USA Today wrote that Thankful was a "calculated", unoriginal debut whose generic material wasted Clarkson's strong, expressive voice. While praising Clarkson's warmth and vocal ability, she argued the album relied too heavily on formula and would have benefited from more creatively supportive collaborators. Q gave the album a very negative review, stating that the album "has her trilling like Mariah Carey on fluffy R&B tunes."

== Commercial performance ==
Thankful performed strongly in the United States, debuting at number one on the Billboard 200 with 297,000 copies sold. The album quickly reached over 1 million sales within six weeks, and by December 8, 2003, shipments had surpassed 2 million units, earning a 2× Platinum certification from the Recording Industry Association of America (RIAA). Billboard placed the album at number 31 on its year-end albums chart. According to Nielsen SoundScan, Thankful has sold 2.8 million copies in the US to date, making it one of Clarkson's best-selling albums.

Internationally, Thankful achieved moderate success. It reached the top five in Canada, where it was certified Platinum for sales of 100,000 units. In Japan, it peaked at number 19 and was certified Gold for 100,000 copies sold. The album reached number 12 in Norway, earning Gold certification for 20,000 units, and charted within the top fifty in the United Kingdom, Australia, and Ireland, receiving Gold certifications in both the UK (100,000 units) and Australia (35,000 units). Overall, the album has sold an estimated 4.5 million copies worldwide.

== Impact and legacy ==
Despite its success and launching Clarkson's career outside of American Idol, some musicians and music critics dismissed her early success as being exclusively reliant on the television program's popularity, and saw her as having little potential longevity as a pop star in the industry. Unconvinced that she was more than a reality television creation, some journalists such as Josh Tyrangiel felt that the album's broad appeal limited its impact and failed to strengthen Clarkson's creative standing with her label or her management. For subsequent music releases, beginning with her second studio album Breakaway (2004), Clarkson demanded more creative control over her projects, including co-writing some of its songs and adopting an "edgier", more rock-leaning musical direction. Some critics deemed Breakaway Clarkson's opportunity to prove her legitimacy as an artist again. Melody Lau of HuffPost said it was only through Breakaway that Clarkson would finally embrace the "Miss Independent" persona she wanted to be known for.

Preston Jones of the Dallas Observer said the success of Clarkson's debut is one of the albums that "represent the apex of Idol’s commercial success, as well as the formidable grip the televised singing competition industry had on the charts in the early aughts". In 2023, Jones said that unlike some of her fellow alumnae, Clarkson managed to establish a career for herself "based more on their own skills than by any association with American Idol", and in retrospect Thankful "illuminates the path Clarkson would spend the next two decades walking". In 2017, Clarkson identified Thankful as her least favorite album, citing the difficulties she encountered during its production. At the time, she was young and eager to record her debut but quickly confronted the complexities of the process, including limited creative control and the involvement of numerous decision-makers. Reflecting on her early experiences in the music industry, Clarkson attributed the difficulties to her youth and inexperience. Although she maintained a fondness for the album itself, she found the process of navigating the industry for the first time to be unenjoyable.

== Track listing ==
Thankful – Standard edition
No.	Title	Writer(s)	Producer(s)	Length
1.	"The Trouble with Love Is"	Kelly Clarkson; Evan Rogers; Carl Sturken	Rogers; Sturken	3:41
2.	"Miss Independent"	Clarkson; Christina Aguilera; Rhett Lawrence; Matt Morris	Lawrence	3:34
3.	"Low"	Jimmy Harry	Clif Magness	3:28
4.	"Some Kind of Miracle"	Diane Warren	Steve Ferrera; Lawrence	3:38
5.	"What's Up Lonely"	Rogers; Sturken; Stephanie Saraco	Rogers; Sturken	4:08
6.	"Just Missed the Train"	Danielle Brisebois; Scott Cutler	Magness	4:10
7.	"Beautiful Disaster"	Rebekah Jordan; Matthew Wilder	Wilder	4:10
8.	"You Thought Wrong" (featuring Tamyra Gray)	Clarkson; Gray; Kenneth "Babyface" Edmonds; Harvey Mason, Jr.; Damon Thomas	The Underdogs; Babyface	3:50
9.	"Thankful"	Clarkson; Edmonds; Mason; Thomas	The Underdogs; Babyface	3:00
10.	"Anytime"	Louis Biancaniello; Sam Watters	Biancaniello; Watters	4:05
11.	"A Moment Like This" (new mix – bonus track)	Jörgen Elofsson; John Reid	Ferrera; Steve Mac	3:48
12.	"Before Your Love" (new mix – bonus track)	Desmond Child; Cathy Dennis; Gary Burr	Child; Dennis	3:59

Thankful – Japanese edition (bonus track)
No.	Title	Writer(s)	Producer(s)	Length
13.	"(You Make Me Feel Like) A Natural Woman"	Carole King; Gerry Goffin; Jerry Wexler	Steven Lipson; James McMillan^{[a]}	2:36

Notes

- ^{^[a]} signifies a co-producer

== Personnel ==
=== Musicians ===
- Kelly Clarkson – lead vocals, backing vocals (2, 4, 5, 11)
- Carl Sturken – keyboards (1, 5), drum programming (1, 5), guitars (5)
- Rhett Lawrence – programming (2, 4), guitars (2), scratching (2), arrangements (2, 4)
- Clif Magness – keyboards (3, 6), acoustic piano (3, 6), programming (3, 6), acoustic guitar (3, 6), electric guitars (3, 6), bass (3, 6), arrangements (3, 6)
- Kenneth Crouch – organ (4)
- Matthew Wilder – acoustic piano (7), programming (7), guitars (7)
- Babyface – instruments (8, 9)
- Harvey Mason Jr. – instruments (8, 9)
- Louis Biancaniello – keyboards (10), programming (10), arrangements (10)
- Steve Mac – keyboards (11)
- Jeremy Ruzumna – organ (11)
- Doug Emery – keyboards (12), programming (12), arrangements (12)
- Jim Gasior – acoustic piano (12)
- Olle Romo – guitars (2)
- Tim Pierce – guitars (4)
- James Harrah – guitars (7)
- Corky James – guitars (8)
- Chris Camozzi – guitars (10)
- Pathik Desai – guitars (11)
- Paul Gendler – guitars (11)
- Fridrik Karlsson – guitars (11)
- Dan Warner – guitars (12)
- Tommy Sims – bass (4)
- Mike Elizondo – bass (7)
- Reggie Hamilton – bass (8, 9)
- Steve Pearce – bass (11)
- Randy Jackson – bass (12)
- Steve Ferrera – drums (1, 2, 4, 11), percussion (11)
- Josh Freese – drums (3)
- Abe Laboriel Jr. – drums (7)
- Teddy Campbell – drums (8)
- Lee Levin – drums (12)
- Wayne Rodrigues – scratching (2)
- Dave Arch – string arrangements (11)
- Cindy Mizelle – backing vocals (1)
- Evan Rogers – backing vocals (1)
- Suzie Benson – backing vocals (2)
- Danielle Brisebois – backing vocals (3, 6)
- Sherree Ford – backing vocals (4)
- Sharlotte Gibson – backing vocals (4)
- Lorenza Stopponi – backing vocals (5)
- Rebekah Jordan – backing vocals (7)
- Tamyra Gray – harmony vocals (8)
- Mary Griffin – backing vocals (10)
- Conesha Owens – backing vocals (10)
- Sam Watters – backing vocals (10), arrangements (10)
- Debra Byrd – backing vocals (11)
- Leslie Smith – backing vocals (11)
- Gina Taylor – backing vocals (11)
- Chris Willis – backing vocals (12), BGV arrangements (12)
- Aisha Wright – backing vocals (12)
- Betty Wright – backing vocals (12)
- Jeanette Wright – backing vocals (12)

Strings (Tracks 1 & 5)

- Larry Gold – arrangements and conductor
- James Cooper III – cello (1, 5)
- Jennie Lorenzo – cello (1)
- Alexandra Leem – viola (1)
- Peter Nocella – viola (1)
- Daniela Pierson – viola (5)
- David Yang – viola (5)
- Charlene Kwas – violin (1)
- Emma Kummrow – violin (1, 5)
- Charles Parker Jr. – violin (1)
- Igor Szwec – violin (1, 5)
- Gregory Teperman – violin (1)
- Ghislaine Fleischmann – violin (5)
- Gloria Justen – violin (5)

Strings and French horn on "Before Your Love"

- David Campbell – arrangements and conductor
- Suzie Katayama – orchestra manager
- Bette Ross-Blumer – musical assistance
- Joel Derouin – concertmaster
- Richard Todd – French horn
- Larry Corbett and Dan Smith – cello
- Bob Becker and Darrin McCann – viola
- Charlie Bisharat, Bruce Dukov, Berj Garabedian, Peter Kent, Michele Richards, John Wittenberg and Ken Yerke – violin

=== Production ===
- Clive Davis – executive producer
- Andrea Derby – production coordinator (1, 5)
- Jolie Levine-Aller – production coordinator (8, 9)
- Brian Coleman – production manager (12)
- Frank Harkins – art direction
- Brett Kilroe – art direction
- Tony Duran – photography

Technical

- J.D. Andrew – engineer (1)
- Rich Balmer – engineer (1)
- Al Hemberger – engineer (1, 5)
- Rhett Lawrence – Pro Tools engineer (2, 4), mixing (2)
- Steve McMillan – Pro Tools engineer (2, 4), mixing (2)
- Olle Romo – Pro Tools engineer (2, 4)
- Jim Watts – Pro Tools engineer (2, 4)
- Andy Zulla – Pro Tools engineer (2, 4), engineer (11), mixing (11), additional recording (12)
- Clif Magness – engineer (3, 6)
- Csaba Petocz – engineer (7)
- Paul Boutin – recording (8, 9)
- Dave Russell – recording (8, 9), mixing (8, 9)
- Louis Biancaniello – engineer (10), mixing (10)
- Sean Tallman – engineer (10)
- Sam Watters – engineer (10)
- Matt Howe – engineer (11)
- Chris Laws – engineer (11)
- Robin Sellars – engineer (11)
- Carlos Alvarez – recording (12), mixing (12)
- Steve Churchyard – recording (12)
- Jules Gondar – recording (12)
- Craig Lozowick – recording (12)
- Dan Bucchi – assistant engineer (1)
- John Ishizeki – assistant engineer (1)
- Kevin Harp – assistant engineer (3, 6)
- Cesar Ramirez – assistant engineer (3, 6)
- Quentin Dunn – second engineer (7)
- Kevin Mahoney – assistant engineer (8, 9)
- Joel Sheppard – assistant engineer (8, 9)
- Daniel Pursey – assistant engineer (11)
- Cosbie Cates – second engineer (12)
- Jimmy Hoyson – second engineer (12)
- Jeff Kanan – second engineer (12)
- Greg London – second engineer (12)
- Marcelo Marulanda – second engineer (12)
- Doug Emery – additional recording (12)
- Conrad Golding – additional recording (12), second engineer (12)
- Dino Hermann – additional recording (12)
- Lee Levin – additional recording (12)
- Jeff Chestek – string engineer (1, 5)
- Gordon Goss – assistant string engineer (1)
- Vincent Dilorenzo – assistant string engineer (5)
- Tony Maserati – mixing (1, 4, 5)
- Dave Pensado – mixing (2)
- Bob Clearmountain – mixing (3, 6)
- Mike Shipley – mixing (7)
- Steve Ferrera – mixing (11)
- Brendan Kuntz – mix assistant (1)
- Matt Snedecor – mix assistant (1, 5)
- Jim Briggs – mix assistant (5)
- Pat Woodward – mix assistant (5)
- Dabling Harward – vocal editing (8, 9)
- Stephen Marcussen – mastering

== Charts ==
=== Weekly charts ===
Weekly chart performance for Thankful
Chart (2003–2006)	Peak position
Australian Albums (ARIA)	33
Canadian Albums (Billboard)	5
Dutch Albums (Album Top 100)	83
Irish Albums (IRMA)	46
Japanese Albums (Oricon)	19
Norwegian Albums (VG-lista)	12
Scottish Albums (Official Charts)	44
UK Albums (Official Charts)	41
US Billboard 200	1

=== Year-end charts ===
Year-end chart performance for Thankful
Chart (2003)	Position
US Billboard 200	31
Worldwide Albums (IFPI)	41

== Certifications and sales ==
Certifications and sales for Thankful
Region	Certification	Certified units/sales
Australia (ARIA)	Gold	35,000^{^}
Canada (Music Canada)	Platinum	100,000^{^}
Japan (RIAJ)	Gold	100,000^{^}
Norway (IFPI Norway)	Gold	20,000^{‡}
Singapore	—	3,000
United Kingdom (BPI)	Gold	155,343
United States (RIAA)	2× Platinum	2,800,000
Summaries
Worldwide	—	4,500,000
^{^} Shipments figures based on certification alone.^{‡} Sales+streaming figures based on certification alone.

== Release history ==
Release history and formats for Thankful
Region	Date	Label	Format(s)	Ref.
Canada	April 15, 2003	Sony BMG	CD	
United States	April 15, 2003	RCA; 19	CD	
Europe	July 7, 2003	Sony BMG	CD	
Japan	July 23, 2003	Sony BMG	CD	
Australia	September 15, 2003	Sony BMG	CD	
Brazil	December 18, 2006	Sony BMG	CD	
