= Losin' Myself =

Single by Debbie Gibson

from the album Body, Mind, Soul
- Released: January 1993
- Length: Album Version 5:14; Single Version 4:01
- Label: Atlantic
- Songwriters: Debbie Gibson, Carl Sturken, Evan Rogers
- Producers: Debbie Gibson, Carl Sturken, Evan Rogers

Debbie Gibson singles chronology
"In His Mind" (1992)	"Losin' Myself" (1993)	"Eyes of the Child" (1993)

Music video
- "Losin' Myself" on YouTube

"Losin' Myself" is a song by American singer-songwriter-actress Debbie Gibson, released in January 1993, by Atlantic Records, as the first single from her fourth album, Body, Mind, Soul (1993). The song was written by Gibson, and co-written and co-produced with Carl Sturken and Evan Rogers. "Little" Louie Vega and Kenny "Dope" Gonzales for Masters at Work Productions remixed it for the single and maxi single releases. Stalling at No. 46 on the US Billboard Hot Maxi Singles chart, No. 49 on the Hot Contemporary chart, and No. 86 on the Hot 100, this song marks Gibson's last appearance on the Hot 100 to date. The accompanying music video was directed by Matthew Rolston.

Gibson recently commented on her thoughts on "Losin' Myself" in a Q&A session from her Twitter followers. Gibson stated, "...I love the song, but it was at the wrong time."

== Critical reception ==
Peter Fawthrop from AllMusic felt that "Losin' Myself" is "one of the least accessible tunes" from the album. Larry Flick from Billboard magazine wrote, "Brace yourself for the new and improved Ms. Gibson. On this first single [...] she delivers her most assured and mature performance to date by exploring the previously untapped lower register of her voice. Add a sullen melody and an urbanized pop/dance groove, and you have the ingredients for a potential smash." Randy Clark from Cashbox remarked that this is "a big stretch from the little popster we knew just a few short years ago. Debbie has made a turn for a more mature sound and a bigger, slightly more R&B style on this mid-tempo ballad."

Jean Rosenbluth from Los Angeles Times named it one of the album’s "more mature moments" and a "dusky ballad single", that emphasize Gibson’s "sure" and "steady" talent. Tim Jeffery from Music Week's RM Dance Update commented on the remix, "It's not the first time Debbie Gibson has had her singles mixed for club consumption. This time it's Masters at Work who transform this slow, funky ballad into a light skipping jazzy house dub. Even though it's lacking in bass, it's a useful track." In a retrospective review, Pop Rescue noted that it has a light beat, that gives the singer "the perfect space in which she can show the warmth and richness of her vocals, before the chorus lets her expand her range."

== Music video ==
The Matthew Rolston-directed video clip for "Losin' Myself" generated a minor controversy due to Gibson's portrayal of a stripper doing a pole dance.

== Track listing ==
- Cassette single
1. "Losin' Myself" (Masters at Work "Hot" Mix/3:57)
2. "Love or Lust" (3:57)
3. "Losin' Myself" (Radio Mix/3:59)
4. "Love or Lust" (3:57)
- 12" single
1. (12" Masters at Work/5:47)
2. (Masters at Work Dub/7:30)
3. (G-Man/Marz "Hot" Mix/5:14)
4. (T-Ray's Hip Hop/5:56)
5. (T-Ray's Acoustic/4:47)
6. (Bass Hit Dub/7:30)

Both songs written by Deborah Gibson/Carl Sturken/Evan Rogers – Music Sales Corp., ASCAP/Bayjun Beat Music/Warner-Tamerlane Pub. Corp./Could Be Music, BMI

== Charts ==
Chart (1993)	Peak position
Australia (ARIA)	126
Canada (RPM)	73
US Billboard Hot 100	86
US Adult Contemporary (Billboard)	49
US Bubbling Under Hot 100 (Billboard)	9
US Dance Club Songs (Billboard)	46
US Cash Box Top 100	84
US Dance Singles Sales (Billboard)	46
