= Hey Donna =

"Hey Donna" is a single from Rythm Syndicate's eponymous 1991 debut album. The song reached number 13 on the Billboard Hot 100.

== Charts ==
Chart (1991)	Peak position
Australia (ARIA)	110
US Billboard Hot 100	13
US Hot R&B Singles (Billboard)	79
