= Body, Mind, Soul =

1993 studio album by Debbie Gibson

Studio album by Debbie Gibson
- Released: January 19, 1993
- Recorded: June–October 1992
- Studios: Electric Blue Studios and Electric Lady Studios (New York City, New York)
- Genre: Pop rock
- Length: 47:33
- Label: Atlantic
- Producers: Deborah Gibson; Carl Sturken; Evan Rogers; Elliot Wolff; Phil Ramone

Debbie Gibson chronology
Anything is Possible (1990)	Body, Mind, Soul (1993)	Think with Your Heart (1995)

Singles from Body, Mind, Soul
- 1. "Losin' Myself" Released: January 1993; 2. "Shock Your Mama" Released: March 1993; 3. "How Can This Be" Released: June 1993; 4. "Free Me" Released: September 1993

Professional ratings
Review scores
Source	Rating
AllMusic	2.5/5 stars
Entertainment Weekly	D
Los Angeles Times	2/4 stars
Orlando Sentinel	1/3 stars
Philadelphia Inquirer	2/4 stars
Reading Eagle	(unfavorable)
Rolling Stone	3/5 stars

Body, Mind, Soul is the fourth studio album by American singer-songwriter Debbie Gibson, released on January 16, 1993, by Atlantic Records. The album, which saw the then 22-year-old Gibson attempt to mature her sound by moving away from dance and pop in favor of sultrier R&B, failed to find favor with the record buying public and missed out on the U.S. top 100, peaking at No. 109, and also in the UK when it was released a few months later. However, the album was a hit in Japan, peaking at No. 13 on the charts. It was Gibson's last studio album under Atlantic Records.

== Reception ==
Billboard praised the album, noting that "maturing former teen icon aims to recapture Mid-80's chart success with a barrelful of potential hits. Perhaps as a result of her recent Broadway appearance, Gibson has begun to plumb the lower end of her alto, sounding downright sultry on such cuts as lead single "Losin' Myself." Other winners are "Shock Your Mama," with an irresistibly catchy chorus and a rap break, and "Love Or Money" and "Free Me," both tailor-made for Top 40."

Rolling Stone praised the album, calling it "surprising...what Deb does here, Madonna only talks about on Erotica...Gibson's breathy notes climb mall waterfalls and extend toward heaven as the music flows into cascades of incrementally harder rhythms; she loses her inhibitions... Body, Mind, Soul is her revenge."

AllMusic were more mixed in their review, commenting that "it must be difficult for a teen sensation to bridge herself from her own self-inflicted goody two-shoes labelling to a modern, respectable artist." The reviewer noted that the co-penned tracks were "gnawing and incessant" and that "to Gibson's credit, the best songs are those written wholly by her."

== Reissues ==
The album was included in the 2017 box set We Could Be Together, with two B-sides and three remixes as bonus tracks. A special two-disc digipack edition was released by Cherry Red Records on November 18, 2022.

== Track listing ==
All tracks are written by and produced by Deborah Gibson, Carl Sturken and Evan Rogers, except where indicated.

No.	Title	Writer(s)	Producer(s)	Length
1.	"Love or Money"			4:06
2.	"Do You Have It in Your Heart?"			4:45
3.	"Free Me"			4:27
4.	"Shock Your Mama"			4:07
5.	"Losin' Myself"			5:17
6.	"How Can This Be?"	Gibson	Gibson	3:57
7.	"When I Say No"	Gibson	Elliot Wolff	3:54
8.	"Little Birdie"	Gibson	Wolff	3:59
9.	"Kisses 4 One"	Gibson	Wolff	3:49
10.	"Tear Down These Walls"	Gibson	Phil Ramone	4:18
11.	"Goodbye"	Gibson; Carole Bayer-Sager; Narada Michael Walden		4:47
Total length:				47:33

- "Shock Your Mama" was omitted from the South Korea release due to music censorship laws.

Japan bonus track
No.	Title	Writer(s)	Producer(s)	Length
12.	"Eyes of the Child"	Gibson	Gibson	2:20

Deluxe Digipack Edition bonus tracks
No.	Title	Writer(s)	Producer(s)	Length
12.	"Love or Lust" (Non-album B-side)
13.	"Eyes of the Child"	Gibson	Gibson
14.	"Shock Your Mama" (The London Apprentice Edit)
15.	"Losin' Myself" (Radio Mix)

Deluxe Digipack Edition Disc 2: The Remixes
No.	Title	Writer(s)	Length
1.	"Losin' Myself" (12" Masters at Work)
2.	"Losin' Myself" (Masters at Work Dub)
3.	"Free Me" (Extended Mix)
4.	"Losin' Myself" (G-Man/Marz "Hot" Mix)
5.	"Losin' Myself" (G-Man/Marz Alternate "Hot" Mix)
6.	"Kisses 4 One" (Percapella)	Gibson
7.	"Losin' Myself" (T-Ray's Hip Hop)
8.	"Losin' Myself" (T-Ray's Acoustic Mix)
9.	"Free Me" (Smoove Free Club Mix)
10.	"Losin' Myself" (Masters at Work "Hot" Mix)
11.	"Losin' Myself" (Masters at Work 12" Edit)

== Charts ==
Weekly chart performance for Body, Mind, Soul
Chart (1993)	Peak position
Australian Albums (ARIA)	180
Japanese Albums Chart	13
US Billboard 200	109
US Cash Box Top 200	100

== Personnel ==
Musicians

- Debbie Gibson – lead and backing vocals, keyboards
- Carl Sturken – keyboards, guitars, drums, "The Guys" on track 1 (tracks 1–5, 11)
- Eric Rehl – keyboards, drums (tracks 6, 10)
- Elliott Wolff – tracks (tracks 7–9)
- Alan Ferrante – guitar (tracks 7–8)
- Ira Siegel – guitar (track 10)
- John "Noodle" Nevin – bass guitar (tracks 4, 11)
- Bashiri Johnson – percussion (tracks 1–9)
- Sammy Figueroa – percussion (track 10)
- Andy Snitzel – saxophone (track 6)
- Dave Koz – saxophone (tracks 8–9)
- Evan Rogers – backing vocals "The Guys" on track 1 (tracks 1–5, 11)
- Darroll Gustamachio – "The Guys" (track 1)
- David Kutch – "The Guys" (track 1)
- Kevin Wright – backing vocals (tracks 4, 11)
- Robin Clark – backing vocals (track 6)
- Michelle Cobbs – backing vocals (track 6)
- Diva Gray – backing vocals (tracks 6, 10)
- Jill Dell'Anzte – backing vocals (track 10)
- Vaneese Thomas – backing vocals (track 10)

Production

- Debbie Gibson – arranger
- Carl Sturken – arranger (tracks 1–5, 11)
- Evan Rogers – arranger (tracks 1–5, 11)
- Eric Rehl – arranger (tracks 6, 10)
- Elliott Wolff – arranger (7–9)
- Phil Ramone – arranger (track 10)
- Darroll Gustamachio – engineer, mixing (Visual Sound Design, Inc.) (tracks 1–6, 10–11)
- Fred Guarino – engineer (tracks 6–10)
- David Kutch – engineer, assistant engineer, mix engineer
- Spyros Poulos – additional programming engineer (tracks 7–9)
- Steve Peck – mixing (tracks 7–9)
- Jennifer Bette – additional mix engineer (tracks 7–9)
- Richard Travali – additional recording (tracks 4, 7–9)
- Mark Gaide – additional recording (track 10)
- Thomas Bricker – art direction
- Dah Len Wee – photography
- Diane Gibson – Management (GMI)
- Herb "Pump" Powers – mastering (The Hit Factory DMS)
