= Shock Your Mama =

1993 single by Debbie Gibson

Single by Debbie Gibson

from the album Body Mind Soul
- B-side: "Love or Lust"
- Released: March 22, 1993
- Label: Atlantic
- Songwriters: Deborah Gibson; Carl Sturken and Evan Rogers
- Producers: Deborah Gibson; Carl Sturken and Evan Rogers

Debbie Gibson singles chronology
"Eyes of the Child" (1993)	"Shock Your Mama" (1993)	"How Can This Be?" (1993)

Music video
- "Shock Your Mama" on YouTube

"Shock Your Mama" is a song by American singer-songwriter-actress Debbie Gibson, released as the second single from her fourth album, Body, Mind, Soul (1993). Co-written by Gibson with Carl Sturken and Evan Rogers, this single was co-produced with by the latter two. The version used as the A-side is a radio edit of the LP Version, entitled the "London Apprentice Edit". Released in March 1993, by Atlantic Records, the song stalled at No. 74 on the UK Singles Chart. The song was banned in South Korea and omitted in the country's release of Body, Mind, Soul due to music censorship laws prohibiting sexually suggestive lyrics.

== Critical reception ==
Larry Flick from Billboard magazine wrote, "Gibson places tongue firmly in cheek on an electric moment from her underrated Body Mind Soul album. Wriggling hip-hop-derived beats percolate beneath a flurry of C&C Music Factory-styled guitars and glossy synths." He added, "Above all, Gibson delivers a spirited vocal that takes on a pouty rap that leaves her kiddie-pop days in the past. Programmers should drop preconceived notions and give this a fair shake." Retrospectively, Pop Rescue noted its "funky 90's sounds, beats, and synth stabs", noting that at times this vocally reminds of Cathy Dennis or early Dannii Minogue.

== Track listing ==
All song were written by Deborah Gibson, Carl Sturken, and Evan Rogers except "Only in My Dreams", written by Gibson.

- European maxi-CD single
1. "Shock Your Mama" (London Apprentice edit) – 3:14
2. "Shock Your Mama" (LP version) – 4:04
3. "Love or Lust" – 3:57
4. "Only in My Dreams" (LP version) – 3:54

== Charts ==
Chart (1993)	Peak position
Australia (ARIA)	139
UK Singles (OCC)	74
UK Top 20 Breakers Chart (Music Week)	13
