= Donny Osmond (album) =

Studio album by Donny Osmond
- Released: April 25, 1989
- Recorded: 1988
- Genre: Rock, dance-pop
- Length: 50:51
- Label: Capitol, EMI
- Producer: Carl Sturken, Evan Rogers, Donny Osmond, George Acogny

Donny Osmond chronology
| Donald Clark Osmond (1977) | Donny Osmond (1989) | Eyes Don't Lie (1990) |

Singles from Donny Osmond
- 1. "Soldier of Love" Released: March 25, 1989; 2. "Sacred Emotion" Released: June 17, 1989; 3. "Hold On" Released: September 30, 1989

Professional ratings
Review scores
| Source | Rating |
|---|---|
| allmusic | 4.5/5 stars |

Donny Osmond is the tenth album released by Donny Osmond. It was released on Capitol Records on April 25, 1989, and was his first studio album since Donald Clark Osmond in 1977. It is notable for featuring the number 2 smash hit, "Soldier of Love", which Randall Popken, Alice Newsome and Lanell Gonzales called "a faintly suggestive tune set to a post-disco beat." It was released as a tune by a "mystery singer", as Osmond's promoter feared that no one would buy the album if the singer was revealed.

The album is also notable for featuring five songs that Osmond co-wrote, and for Osmond also handling drum programming and keyboards on several tracks. In addition to "Soldier of Love," it featured four other charting singles: "Sacred Emotion" (another big radio hit), "Hold On," "I'll Be Good to You," and "If It's Love That You Want." Another single, "I'm In It For Love," featured only as a bonus track on some copies of the compact disc, had become a minor UK hit prior to the success of "Soldier of Love."

== Track listing ==
1. "Soldier of Love" (Carl Sturken, Evan Rogers) - 3:51
2. "If It's Love That You Want" (Carl Sturken, Evan Rogers) - 4:26
3. "Sacred Emotion" (featuring Dave Koz) (Carl Sturken, Evan Rogers) - 5:11
4. "Inner Rhythm" (Matthew Wilder, Sharon Robinson) - 3:24
5. "Faces in the Mirror" (Carl Sturken, Evan Rogers, Donny Osmond) - 5:20
6. "My Secret Touch" (George Acogny, Mark Holden, Steven LeGassick, Donny Osmond) - 4:12
7. "I'll Be Good to You" (Steve Kipner, Mark Spiro) - 6:03
8. "Groove" (George Acogny, Donny Osmond) - 4:56
9. "Only Heaven Knows" (George Acogny, Donny Osmond) - 4:36
10. "Hold On" (featuring Dave Koz) (Donny Osmond, Evan Rogers, Carl Sturken) - 4:01
11. "I'm In It for Love" - bonus track (Andy Goldmark, Peter Henderson) - 4:50

== Production ==
=== Tracks 1–3, 5, 7, 10 & 11 ===
- Produced by Carl Sturken and Evan Rogers
- Tracks 1 & 2 mixed by Acar Key
- Tracks 3, 5, 7, 10 & 11 mixed by Darroll Gustamachio

=== Tracks 4, 8, 9 ===
- Produced by George Acogny
- Tracks 4 & 9 mixed by Rod Beale
- Track 8 mixed by Michael Bauer

=== Track 6 ===
- Produced by Donny Osmond, George Acogny and Evan Rogers.
- Mixed by Darroll Gustamachio

=== Engineers ===
- Quinn Baston, Rod Beale, Dave Botrill, Darroll Gustamachio, Mike Harlow, Matt Hathaway, Steve Heinke, Acar Key and Matt Noble.
- Album mastered by Tony Cousins

== Personnel ==
- Donny Osmond – lead vocals, backing vocals (1–6, 8, 10), drum programming (6), keyboards (9, 11)
- James Stroud – Synclavier programming
- Carl Sturken – keyboards (1–5, 7, 10, 11), guitars (1, 2, 5, 7, 10)
- Peter-John Vettese – keyboards (4, 6, 8, 9), fretless bass (6), drum programming (9)
- Erwin De Marc Hadour – keyboards (6)
- Rory Kaplan – keyboards (7)
- Ira Siegel – guitars (4)
- Alan Murphy – guitars (6)
- Michael Thompson – guitars (7)
- J.J. Bell – guitars (8)
- John "Noodle" Nevin – bass (1, 3, 5, 10)
- Darryl Jones – bass (4)
- Manu Katché – drums (4), percussion (4), bass vocals (4)
- Manny Elias – LinnDrum (4)
- Jean-Paul Ceccarelli – drums (6, 8)
- Carol Steele – percussion (8)
- Dave Koz – saxophone (3, 10)
- Michael Brecker – saxophone (4, 6), EWI (4, 9)
- Cindy Mizelle – backing vocals (1, 10)
- Evan Rogers – backing vocals (1–3, 5, 6, 10)
- Carol Kenyon – backing vocals (3)
- Barbara Drennan – backing vocals (4)
- Julian Littman – backing vocals (4)
- Dolette McDonald – backing vocals (4, 8)
- Carol Rowley – backing vocals (4, 6)
- Linda Taylor – backing vocals (4, 6)
- Dave Botrell – voice (9)
- Audrey Wheeler – backing vocals (10)
- Lorelie McBroom – backing vocals (11)

== Charts ==
Album - Billboard (United States)

| Year | Chart | Position |
|---|---|---|
| 1989 | The Billboard 200 | 54 |

Singles - Billboard (United States)

| Year | Single | Chart | Position |
|---|---|---|---|
| 1989 | "Sacred Emotion" | Adult Contemporary | 4 |
| 1989 | "Sacred Emotion" | The Billboard Hot 100 | 13 |
| 1989 | "Hold On" | Dance Music/Club Play Singles | 36 |
| 1989 | "Hold On" | The Billboard Hot 100 | 73 |
| 1989 | "Soldier of Love" | The Billboard Hot 100 | 2 |
