= Miss Independent (Kelly Clarkson song) =

2003 single by Kelly Clarkson

Single by Kelly Clarkson

from the album Thankful
- B-side: "(You Make Me Feel Like) A Natural Woman"; "Respect"; "Low"
- Released: April 10, 2003
- Recorded: 2002
- Studio: Sound Gallery (Los Angeles, California)
- Genre: Power pop; R&B; robo-funk
- Length: 3:35
- Label: RCA
- Songwriters: Kelly Clarkson; Rhett Lawrence; Christina Aguilera; Matt Morris
- Producer: Rhett Lawrence

Kelly Clarkson singles chronology
"A Moment Like This" / "Before Your Love" (2002)	"Miss Independent" (2003)	"Low" (2003)

Music video
- "Miss Independent" on YouTube

"Miss Independent" is a song by American singer Kelly Clarkson from her debut studio album, Thankful (2003). Written by Clarkson, Christina Aguilera, Rhett Lawrence, and Matt Morris, with Lawrence serving as producer, it was released as the album's lead single by RCA Records on April 10, 2003, preceding its release by five days. The track was initially intended for Aguilera's fourth album, Stripped (2002), but was left half-finished. Lawrence later continued writing the song with Clarkson, who eventually recorded it.

"Miss Independent" is a power pop, R&B, and robo-funk song, whose lyrics tell of a story of a confident woman who finally allows herself to lower her emotional and communication barriers in order to fall in love. Its theme of self-sufficiency would later serve as a template for Clarkson's subsequent releases. The song received mixed reviews from music critics, who applauded her attempt to break away from her American Idol persona, while criticism targeted the song's similarity to Aguilera's material. "Miss Independent" gave Clarkson her first Grammy nomination in the Best Female Pop Vocal Performance category at the 46th Grammy Awards in 2004.

The song's commercial success helped in presenting Clarkson's "girl next door" image to the public and contributed in eliminating her American Idol persona. In the United States, "Miss Independent" peaked at number nine on the Billboard Hot 100 and number one on the Mainstream Top 40 chart. Internationally, the song attained top-10 positions in Australia, Canada, the Netherlands, and the United Kingdom. It was certified gold by the Recording Industry Association of America (RIAA) and Australian Recording Industry Association (ARIA). The song's accompanying music video was directed by Liz Friedlander, and featured Clarkson singing at a house party. Clarkson premiered the song during the second season of American Idol, and has included it in set lists in most of her concert tours.

== Background and release ==
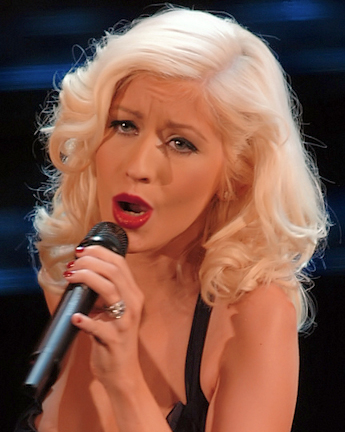
The song was originally intended for Christina Aguilera, but was passed to Clarkson without either singer's knowledge.

American record producer Rhett Lawrence first offered the early work of the song, titled "Miss Independence", to American R&B trio Destiny's Child, who turned down the offer to record the song. Lawrence then collaborated with Christina Aguilera and Matt Morris to record "Miss Independence" for Aguilera's fourth studio album Stripped (2002). However, the track was only half-recorded and without a bridge before Aguilera finished production on Stripped. The song was handed over to Clive Davis and Clarkson's then-manager Simon Fuller, who were looking for material for Clarkson's debut album Thankful (2003). Clarkson helped rewrite the song with Lawrence, during which time one of her A&R managers, Keith Naftaly, suggested the song be re-titled "Miss Independent". Despite this, Clarkson said she had to fight to have the song included on her album, since she recalled that the label had been pushing for her to record more ballads. The song was one of four songs on Thankful that Clarkson co-wrote; the others were "The Trouble with Love Is", "You Thought Wrong", and the title track "Thankful".

There are conflicting reports of how the song was given to Clarkson. Davis said in his 2013 autobiography The Soundtrack of My Life that it was Lawrence who passed the track without Aguilera's knowledge or approval. Clarkson—who was unaware of Aguilera or Morris' involvement until receiving the liner notes for Thankful—stated it was an A&R manager, who purposefully kept the information from her so she would not turn down the song; she said this to be the first example of "how people flat out lie or omit", and that what bothered her was that she had given interviews which made it look like she had written the song solely with Lawrence. Clarkson also claimed to Bournemouth Daily Echo that RCA did not want the song on the album, and she argued with the label "to the point of literally crying" to get the song on the record. In The Soundtrack of My Life, Davis claimed that although Aguilera had decided not to use the song, she was "distinctly miffed" Lawrence passed on the song without her knowledge, and only subsided when both "Miss Independent" and Aguilera's own song "Beautiful" were both nominated Best Female Pop Vocal Performance, and "Beautiful" won. Though Davis says Aguilera was mad at Clarkson, Aguilera had earlier clarified she was not, and on Total Request Live, said the song was "a good choice for her... If the song was to go to anyone, I'm glad it went to you because you gave it justice."

"Miss Independent" was released to mainstream radio in the United States by RCA Records on April 10, 2003, five days ahead of Thankful's release. It was later released as a separate CD single on May 25, before being released as a 7-inch single, a 12-inch single, and a digital download on September 23. In the United Kingdom, the song was released as a CD single on August 25; a maxi single was released in Austria and Germany by BMG on August 12. Most of the singles contained Clarkson's renditions of the songs "(You Make Me Feel Like) A Natural Woman", which was included on Thankful, and "Respect". In 2009, the song was made available for purchase as downloadable content for the Rock Band, Rock Band 2, and Lego Rock Band video games.

Clarkson said the song helped establish her as a songwriter instead of solely a vocalist, eventually paving the way for co-written singles such as "Behind These Hazel Eyes".

== Composition ==
"Miss Independent"
A 23-second sample of "Miss Independent, highlighting the musical composition.

"Miss Independent" is a pop, power pop, R&B, R&B-pop, and robo-funk song. Katherine St. Asaph of Popdust noted that "it's the closest Kelly Clarkson's come to R&B." Clarkson said that Aguilera's rhythmic style heavily influenced the song. She remarked, "You can hear a lot of her influence in 'Miss Independent', especially the hook. And once you hear the song, it's constantly in your head. Believe me, I cannot get it out!" Rachell Kipp of the Associated Press wrote that "Miss Independent" "sounds like a half-baked remake of Aguilera's 'Dirrty' (2002)" The song has a length of three minutes and 35 seconds and is written in the key of B minor, Clarkson's vocal range spans from F♯_{3} to F♯_{5}.

The lyrics tells the story of an independent woman who was apprehensive about being in a relationship in fears of being rejected, she finally allows herself to break her emotional and communication barriers when she begins to fall in love. Clarkson revealed that she finds herself similar to the titular "Miss Independent". She said, "It's very funny when the song came into play with me ... 'cause at that certain time of my life, I was actually going through that kind of thing," Clarkson said. "I've always been real guarded about work and career. It wasn't even with, like, guy relationships, it was just, like, friends and just letting people in, you know? And so it was kinda weird 'cause I was going through that same thing at the same time, so it was very easy for me to write the bridge to the song."

== Critical reception ==
"Miss Independent" received mixed to positive reviews from music critics, who lauded Clarkson for distancing herself from her American Idol persona, but criticized the song's resemblance to some of the songs on Stripped—particularly "Dirrty" and "Fighter" (2002). Upon its release, Brian Hiatt of Entertainment Weekly noted that "its hard R&B sound may shock fans who embraced the mellow 'A Moment Like This'. 'Miss Independent' begins with Clarkson singing in a throaty moan over a bangin' hip-hop beat, then bursts into a power-chord-propelled, disco-diva chorus that's not unlike Britney Spears' 'Stronger'". Rolling Stone wrote, "'A Moment Like This' was exactly the sort of treacly by-the-numbers ballad critics expected of a TV-contest winner; that's probably why its assertive follow-up, 'Miss Independent', was such a surprise". AllMusic's senior editor Stephen Thomas Erlewine wrote that it "managed to make Kelly Clarkson seem younger and hipper without slutting her up like Christina Aguilera (who, ironically, co-wrote 'Miss Independent' the first single from Thankful) while retaining a strong sense of melodic songcraft". Sal Cinquemani of Slant Magazine wrote that the song "gives Clarkson the youthful edge she desperately needs to balance out the Adult Contemporary goo of songs like 'Anytime' and 'A Moment Like This'. Cinquemani also added, "'Miss Independent' is no 'Dirrty', but it proves that if anyone can out-sing Aguilera, it's Clarkson". On March 5, 2013, Billboard ranked the song number sixteen in its list of "Top 100 American Idol Hits of All Time".

Howard Cohen of The Baltimore Sun wrote, "The R&B-styled stomper 'Miss Independent', sounds like the fat removed from Aguilera's meatier 'Fighter' – which could well be the case, since she co-wrote both tunes". Elysa Gardner of USA Today was more critical of the song, calling it "breathless" and "colorless". She also added that the song "sounds less like the edgy, strong-but-vulnerable-woman number it purports to be than the Christina Aguilera throwaway it basically is". The song received a nomination for Best Female Pop Vocal Performance at the 2004 Grammy Awards, but lost out to Aguilera's "Beautiful". It was also nominated for Choice Summer Song at the 2003 Teen Choice Awards.

== Commercial performance ==
"Miss Independent" debuted at the Billboard Bubbling Under Hot 100 Singles chart at number 23 on the week ending May 3, 2003. It then debuted on the Mainstream Top 40 chart for the week ending May 10, 2003, eventually topping the chart for six weeks beginning on the week ending June 28, 2003. The song debuted on the main Billboard Hot 100 on the week ending May 17, 2003, at number 61, eventually peaking at number nine for two consecutive weeks starting in its tenth week, becoming her second top ten single in the United States. It was present on the chart for a total of twenty weeks, spending its final week on the chart at number 43 on the week ending September 27, 2003, before going recurrent the following week. It also charted on Adult Top 40 and Adult Contemporary charts at number 14 and number 28, respectively. The single's success came at the time when the Billboard charts were relying to more R&B and rhythmic stations than pop stations. As of September 2017, "Miss Independent" has sold over 1,035,000 digital downloads in the United States. It was certified Gold by Recording Industry Association of America (RIAA) in 2006.

Internationally, the song also became a commercial success, becoming Clarkson's first single to chart outside of North America. In Australia, it debuted on the Australian Singles Chart at number 17 in August 2003, eventually peaking at number four after Clarkson performed it at the 2003 NRL Grand Final at the Stadium Australia on October 5, 2003. It eventually became her highest-charting single in Australia along with "Since U Been Gone" (2004) before being overtaken by "Mr. Know It All", which topped the chart in 2011. In the United Kingdom, "Miss Independent" debuted and peaked at number six on the UK Singles Chart in August 2003. It the Netherlands, the song debuted on the Dutch Top 40 at number 27, eventually peaking at number nine. The song also charted in Austria, Germany, Ireland, Sweden, and Switzerland.

== Music video ==
The song's accompanying music video was filmed in Los Angeles by Liz Friedlander, who didn't know Clarkson at the time. Friedlander remarked, "Honestly, I never watched American Idol, so I didn't have a preconceived notion of her." She said about the video, "The song is explosive and young and has some cool electronic beats, so we took the visual style from the music." Clarkson added, "It's gonna be more Kelly Clarkson the artist, not [Kelly Clarkson] from American Idol." The video features Clarkson performing at a house party in reverse, starting from the morning after and working its way back to the previous night, where she appears attracted to a "surfer" whom she keeps seeing in mirrors. Friedlander adds, "And in the end — maybe — they get together." It premiered on MTV on June 2, 2003. The video received three nominations at the 2003 MTV Video Music Awards—Best New Artist in a Video, Best Pop Video, and Viewer's Choice Award.

== Live performances ==
Clarkson premiered "Miss Independent" on the second season of American Idol in May 2003. Throughout 2003, she performed it on various television events, including the inaugural season of Australian Idol, The Late Show with David Letterman, and The Late Late Show with Craig Kilborn. She also performed the song in sports events, notably at the 2003 NRL Grand Final at the Stadium Australia on October 5, 2003. Since then, she has included the song in her set lists on tour, even naming her first co-headlining tour, the Independent Tour (2004, after the song. In 2012, she performed a medley of her songs at the 40th Anniversary American Music Awards, beginning with "Miss Independent", continuing to "Since U Been Gone", "Stronger (What Doesn't Kill You)", and "Catch My Breath".

== Formats and track listing ==
"Miss Independent" – Digital download
No.	Title	Length
1.	"Miss Independent" (Junior Vasquez Tribal)	9:20

"Miss Independent" – Enhanced CD single
No.	Title	Length
1.	"Miss Independent"	3:35
2.	"(You Make Me Feel Like A) Natural Woman"	2:36
3.	"Miss Independent" (MaUVe Mix)	7:55
4.	"Miss Independent" (Music video)	3:35

"Miss Independent" – 12-inch single
No.	Title	Length
1.	"Miss Independent" (Junior's Kelly Rock Mix)	9:04
2.	"Miss Independent" (Hani's Extended Club Mix)	9:08

"Miss Independent" – 7-inch single
No.	Title	Length
1.	"Miss Independent"	3:35
2.	"Low"	3:29

"Miss Independent" – Maxi single
No.	Title	Length
1.	"Miss Independent"	3:35
2.	"Respect"	2:15
3.	"(You Make Me Feel Like A) Natural Woman"	2:36

"Miss Independent" – Cassette single
No.	Title	Length
1.	"Miss Independent"	3:35
2.	"(You Make Me Feel Like A) Natural Woman"	2:36
3.	"Miss Independent" (MaUVe Mix)	7:55

"Miss Independent" – International CD single
No.	Title	Length
1.	"Miss Independent" (MaUVe Full Vocal Mix)	3:32
2.	"Miss Independent" (Shanghai Surprise Mix)	7:33
3.	"Miss Independent" (MaUVe Dub)	7:55
4.	"Miss Independent"	3:35

== Charts ==
=== Weekly charts ===
Weekly chart performance for "Miss Independent"
Chart (2003)	Peak position
Australia (ARIA)	3
Austria (Ö3 Austria Top 40)	39
Belgium (Ultratip Bubbling Under Flanders)	9
Germany (GfK)	52
Ireland (IRMA)	11
Netherlands (Dutch Top 40)	9
Netherlands (Single Top 100)	27
Scottish Singles Sales (Official Charts)	5
Sweden (Sverigetopplistan)	25
Switzerland (Schweizer Hitparade)	44
UK Singles (Official Charts)	6
US Billboard Hot 100	9
US Adult Contemporary (Billboard)	28
US Adult Pop Airplay (Billboard)	14
US Dance Airplay (Billboard)	11
US Pop Airplay (Billboard)	1

=== Year-end charts ===
Year-end chart performance for "Miss Independent"
Chart (2003)	Position
Australia (ARIA)	53
Netherlands (Dutch Top 40)	80
UK Singles (OCC)	119
US Billboard Hot 100	44
US Adult Top 40 (Billboard)	31
US Mainstream Top 40 (Billboard)	14

== Certifications ==
Certifications and sales for "Miss Independent"
Region	Certification	Certified units/sales
Australia (ARIA)	Gold	35,000^{^}
United States (RIAA)	Gold	1,035,000
^{^} Shipments figures based on certification alone.

== Release history ==
Release dates and formats for "Miss Independent"
Region	Date	Format	Label	Catalog	Ref.
United States	April 10, 2003	Mainstream radio	RCA	—N/a	
United States	May 25, 2003	CD single	RCA	82876-55924-2	
Australia	August 4, 2003	CD single	BMG	82876 548722	
Austria	August 12, 2003	Maxi single	BMG	82876-54872-2	
Germany	August 12, 2003	Maxi single	BMG	82876-54872-2	
United Kingdom	August 25, 2003	CD single	BMG	82876-55364-1	
United States	September 23, 2003	12-inch single	RCA	RDAB 54626	
United States	September 23, 2003	7-inch single	RCA	82876-56533-7	
United States	September 23, 2003	Digital download	RCA	—N/a	

== See also ==
- List of Mainstream Top 40 number-one hits of 2003 (U.S.)
