= Sacred Emotion =

1989 Donny Osmond song

Single by Donny Osmond

from the album Donny Osmond
- B-side: "Groove"
- Released: June 17, 1989
- Genre: Pop
- Length: 5:11
- Label: Capitol
- Songwriter: Carl Sturken and Evan Rogers
- Producers: Carl Sturken, Evan Rogers

"Sacred Emotion" is a pop ballad performed by Donny Osmond. The song was the second single released from the 1989 album Donny Osmond. It reached No. 4 on the Billboard Adult Contemporary chart and No. 13 on the Billboard Hot 100 chart in 1989.

The song's music video was inspired by a scene in Witness in which a barn raising takes place. Capitol Records video department supervisor Mick Kleber first hired Paula Walker to direct the video, but that version was canceled due to a conflict with a production adviser. Kleber instead hired Michael Bay, who was then an ArtCenter College of Design student, based on Bay's demo reel. Filming took three days, and it took place in the Arizona desert.

A portion of the video was played on The Today Show shortly after filming, before the video was completely finished. Anne-Marie Mackay, who was then the head of music video at Propaganda Films, enjoyed the video clip and Bay was quickly signed to Propaganda Films. Not everyone at the company agreed: cofounder Joni Sighvatsson believed Bay's work to be too "sleek and commercial," and not "cool" enough, but agreed he was technically skilled.
