= Before Your Love =

2002 single by Kelly Clarkson

Single by Kelly Clarkson
- A-side: "A Moment Like This"
- Released: September 17, 2002
- Recorded: 2002
- Studio: The Gentlemen's Club (Miami Beach, Florida); Westlake (Hollywood, California); Capitol (Los Angeles)
- Genre: Pop
- Length: 4:00
- Label: RCA
- Songwriters: Desmond Child; Cathy Dennis; Gary Burr
- Producers: Desmond Child; Cathy Dennis

Kelly Clarkson singles chronology
"A Moment Like This" / "Before Your Love" (2002)	"Miss Independent" (2003)

Music video
- "Before Your Love" on YouTube

"Before Your Love" is a song by American pop singer Kelly Clarkson. On September 17, 2002, RCA released it as a double-A side with "A Moment Like This" as her coronation single after winning the first season of American Idol. A remixed version of the song was later included on her debut studio album, Thankful (2003). It went on to become the best-selling single of 2002 in the United States.

== Background and release ==
"Before Your Love" was written and produced by Desmond Child and Cathy Dennis for the winner of the inaugural season of American Idol. Kelly Clarkson, Justin Guarini, Nikki McKibbin, and Tamyra Gray each recorded a version of the song in case one of them won the season. It was first performed live by Clarkson and Guarini during the final showdown of American Idol at the Kodak Theatre on September 3, 2002. It was then performed by Clarkson during the grand finale on September 4, 2002 before winning the title. It was released as a double-A single with "A Moment Like This" on September 17, 2002. It was also one of the few songs to be released as a DVD single in the early 2000s. Clarkson included the song in the setlist for the American Idol Tour in 2002. A music video of the song premiered on MTV as her first music video in September 2002. A remix of the song was featured in Clarkson's debut album, Thankful.

== Reception ==
=== Critical reception ===
The song has received mixed to positive reviews from music critics. David Browne of Entertainment Weekly gave the song a "D+" rating, he remarked "The lyrics are generalized banalities (I never lived before your love/I never felt before your touch), the melodies destined to endure as wedding songs or florist ads. A choir at the end of "A Moment Like This" is meant to indicate earthiness; the gentle acoustic guitar throughout "Before Your Love," sensitivity." Rito Asilo of the Philippine Daily Inquirer remarked that the song's lyrics were "corny," but praised Clarkson's voice. Sal Cinquemani of Slant Magazine wrote: "Yes, the girl's got immeasurable talent, but the last note of Thankful's final track, a new mix of "Before Your Love," speaks volumes: this is the sound of strained excess."

=== Commercial performance ===
The song became a commercial success throughout North America, establishing Clarkson as a hit singer. Along with "A Moment Like This", "Before Your Love" entered the US Billboard Hot 100 chart at number 52. The following week it ascended to number one, fueled by sales of over 236,000 copies, making it the first single to sell more than 200,000 copies since 1999. Its ascent broke the record set by the British band The Beatles for the biggest leap to number one after their single "Can't Buy Me Love" rose from number 27 to number one in April 1964. That record was later broken by the American pop rock band Maroon 5 when "Makes Me Wonder" rose from number 64 to number one in May 2007. Clarkson would later break it again when her single "My Life Would Suck Without You" rose from number 97 to number one in February 2009. Despite being commercially successful, it received minimal radio airplay in favor of "A Moment Like This". It was later certified gold by the RIAA and double platinum by Music Canada.

== Music video ==
The music video to the song begins with Clarkson returning to her home after her win on American Idol. She sits in her bedroom before getting ready for a date with her boyfriend. Driving her home from her date, her boyfriend surprises her with a house party in her backyard with friends and family celebrating her American Idol win.

Scenes of Clarkson singing in her bedroom and while sitting on her pool ladder intercut throughout.

== Track listing ==
CD single

1. "Before Your Love" – 4:00
2. "A Moment Like This" – 3:50

7" single

1. "Before Your Love" – 3:59
2. "A Moment Like This" – 3:47

DVD single

1. "Before Your Love" (video) – 3:52
2. "A Moment Like This" (video) – 3:47

== Credits and personnel ==
Personnel

- Kelly Clarkson – lead vocals and background vocals
- Gary Burr – songwriter
- Desmond Child – songwriter, producer
- Cathy Dennis – songwriter, producer
- Carlos Alvarez – mixing
- Stephen Ferrera – A&R

== Charts ==
Chart (2002)	Peak position
Canadian Singles Chart (Nielsen)	1
US Hot Singles Sales (Billboard)	1

== Certifications and sales ==
Region	Certification	Certified units/sales
Canada (Music Canada)	2× Platinum	40,000^{*}
South Korea (Gaon)	—	138,715
United States (RIAA)	Gold	500,000^{^}
^{*} Sales figures based on certification alone.^{^} Shipments figures based on certification alone.

== Release history ==
Release dates and formats for "Before Your Love"
Region	Date	Format	Label	Ref.
United States	September 17, 2002	CD single	RCA	
United States	November 26, 2002	DVD single	RCA	

== See also ==
- List of best-selling singles in the United States (by year)
