= Carl Sturken and Evan Rogers =

American songwriter and record producer duo

- Origin: New York City, New York, U.S.
- Genres: Pop; R&B; rock; dance; hip hop
- Years active: 1980s–present
- Label: SRP
- Members: Carl Sturken; Evan Rogers

Carl Sturken and Evan Rogers are New York–based songwriters and record producers. They have produced hits for Ruben Studdard, Wild Orchid, Christina Aguilera and Evelyn Champagne King and helped build the career of Rihanna. In addition to being principals of Rihanna's production company SRP Music Group, they have achieved more than twenty top 40 hits, twelve top 5 hits and six BMI Awards. Their songs have sold more than 60 million albums around the world.

== History ==
=== 1980s ===
Sturken and Rogers started their careers in the New York R&B scene of the mid-1980s. During that time, Rogers released a full-length solo album, 1985's Love Games for RCA Records (he would release a second album, Faces of Love for Capitol four years later), and the duo produced Gavin Christopher for EMI Manhattan Records, scoring their first big hit with Christopher's "One Step Closer to You." They also worked on the legendary Beat Street soundtrack and began to build a reputation by producing such artists as Cheryl Lynn, Stephanie Mills and Jennifer Holliday. They then crossed over to the pop world by engineering the comeback of Donny Osmond, writing and producing the number 2 smash "Soldier of Love" and the Top 10 hit "Sacred Emotion".

=== 1990s ===
Following their success with Donny Osmond, they formed an R&B group called Rythm Syndicate with John Nevin, Rob Mingrino and Kevin Cloud, all of whom hailed from Connecticut. In 1991, the group scored a number 2 hit on the US Billboard charts, "P.A.S.S.I.O.N.", as well as a Top 15 follow-up, "Hey Donna". In addition to providing vocals for the group, Rogers and Sturken wrote or co-wrote all of their songs. However, after two years of touring and promotion, along with two unsuccessful albums and a few less successful singles, Sturken and Rogers disbanded the group to resume writing and producing full-time.

They wrote and/or produced six songs for Debbie Gibson's 1993 album Body Mind Soul including US single "Losin' Myself" and the UK single "Shock Your Mama". Success came next in the UK with the Top 5 single "Power of a Woman" for Eternal. More work overseas followed, including contributions to the Brand New Heavies' platinum album Shelter. For the Irish boy band Boyzone, they wrote and produced four songs for the group's Where We Belong album, which entered at number 1 on the UK charts. The six-time platinum album includes the Sturken & Rogers penned "All That I Need", which was a UK number 1 single. The song also appears on Boyzone's Greatest Hits package, By Request, which spent over two months at number 1 and also had sales of over six million units.

In 1997, they shifted their attention back to the U.S. The hit "(God Must Have Spent) A Little More Time on You", written and produced for NSYNC, was a Billboard Top 10 single, before climbing into the Billboard Country Top 5 after being covered by country recording legend Alabama. The song also received a Grammy nomination in 2000 for Best Country Collaboration by a group or duo. NSYNC's debut album sold over 10 million copies in the US alone. In addition to the pop and country versions of "(God Must Have Spent) A Little More Time on You", the song was also recorded by jazz artist Kirk Whalum for his album Unconditional, which was nominated for Best Pop Instrumental Performance at the 2002 Grammy Awards. Sturken & Rogers also wrote and produced several songs for Christina Aguilera’s debut album. The album entered the Billboard charts at number 1 and went double platinum after only three weeks, eventually totaling sales in excess of 11 million worldwide. They also branched out into the jazz world working with Dave Koz on his album The Dance. The album contains two Sturken & Rogers penned songs, including "Can’t Let You Go", co-written with Koz and featuring Luther Vandross on vocals, which went on to become a number 1 hit on the Smooth Jazz chart. The duo also had songs on the multi-platinum debut albums of Jessica Simpson, Alsou, Mandy Moore and Anastacia, as well as many other collaborations with such artists as Christina Milian and Emma Bunton. They also wrote songs with and for The Brand New Heavies Shelter LP notably Last To Know with Simon Bartholomew.

=== 2000s ===
As the 1990s came to a close and teen pop died down, 98 Degrees’ double platinum album Revelation was their last album of this style. Sturken & Rogers changed gears once again, discovering and developing Javier, whom they signed to Capitol Records. They wrote and produced the majority of his debut album, including the hit single "Crazy". Clive Davis hired the team to work on Kelly Clarkson’s debut album, for which they wrote the hit single "The Trouble with Love Is", also featured in the movie Love Actually. The Davis connection continued with the American Idol project in 2004, as well as Rod Stewart’s As Time Goes By: the Great American Songbook 2 and two tracks for Ruben Studdard's double platinum debut album, Soulful.

The duo then decided to begin developing artists in earnest, forming Syndicated Rhythm Productions in 2005.

Their first signing was Rihanna, whom Rogers discovered while visiting family in Barbados. They brought her to Jay-Z and L.A. Reid at Def Jam Records and she was signed within hours of her audition. Rihanna’s first single "Pon De Replay", co-written and produced by Sturken & Rogers, went on to be a worldwide hit launching Rihanna into stardom. The "Pon De Replay" release caused a significant controversy surrounding Rihanna and Jay-Z's relationship. This rumor was later debunked by Rihanna's publicist Jonathan Hay who claimed it was a PR stunt that was conceived by him to promote the "Pon de Replay" release. This PR stunt has been featured in numerous documentaries and used as case studies involving the ramifications of public relations. Rihanna’s second album, A Girl Like Me, contained the hit singles "SOS" and "Unfaithful", and established her as an international star. In 2007 Rihanna scored one of the biggest singles of the year with "Umbrella"; the follow-up single "Shut Up and Drive" was written and produced by Sturken & Rogers, and became a top 10 hit worldwide, as well as being featured in the movies 21, I Love You Man, Cars and Wreck-It Ralph. Good Girl Gone Bad went on to be one of the best-selling albums of that year, selling over 15 million copies worldwide to date. As of November 2013, Rihanna sold over 50 million albums and 180 million singles worldwide. The SRP artist roster continued to grow during this time; next up was Shontelle, who they brought to Steve Rifkind’s SRC/Universal Motown label, where they produced her debut album Shontelligence in 2008. Shontelle has joined fellow Barbadian Rihanna at the top of the charts with her first hit, "T-Shirt", which was a top 15 hit in the US, and was top 5 for a month in the U.K., where she has followed it with her second hit "Stuck with Each Other", a duet with Akon from the movie Confessions of a Shopaholic.

=== 2010s ===
Sturken and Rogers continued writing and producing for artists outside of their own stable with their song "Issues", they scored yet another top smash with British girl group The Saturdays. They also co-wrote the song "Gypsy" for Shakira, which was an international hit and won a Latin BMI award, as well as Shontelle’s follow up album included the worldwide platinum smash "Impossible". The time had come for the next chapter of Sturken and Rogers' career, and thus the SRP Records label was formed in early 2009, in partnership with Universal/Motown. Their first signing was Vita Chambers who opened for Justin Bieber’s 2010 "My World" tour, and then scored a gold single in Canada with her single "Fix You".

Singer/songwriter Taylor Berrett was discovered by SRP while still a high school student in Washington, DC. After signing a publishing deal with Kara DioGuardi’s Arthouse Music, Taylor signed a deal through SRP with Warner Bros. records, and recorded his debut album with producer Jake Gosling (Ed Sheeran, Christina Perri).

Nashville born pianist/singer Kandace Springs was SRP’s next discovery; they signed her to Don Was at Blue Note/Capitol. In 2014 she performed her debut single "Love Got in the Way" on the Late Show with David Letterman, followed by a slew of other national television appearances, and performances at the Afropunk and Bonnaroo festivals, as well as performing with Prince at the "Purple Rain" 30th anniversary show at Paisley Park. Her 2016 debut album Soul Eyes was produced by Grammy legend Larry Klein.

The following signing to SRP was 20-year-old singer/flute prodigy Elena Pinderhughes; having already toured the world, played the White House, and performed with such giants as Herbie Hancock, her debut studio introduction was on Christian Scott's Stretch Music introducing Elena Pinderhughes in 2016.

Sturken and Rogers have also begun to build their own stable of writers/producers, forming a joint venture with Universal Music Publishing Group. Their first signing, Brandon Alexander, a.k.a. BAM, had his breakout with the Grammy nominated Tyrese smash "Stay" which spent 11 weeks at number 1 on the Adult Urban chart. BAM was also nominated for a Grammy for the Chris Brown/Kendrick Lamar collaboration "Autumn Leaves", and he wrote and produced 9 of the 11 cuts on Tyrese's new album, which entered at number 1 on the Billboard Hot 200 Albums chart. Most recently SRP paired two young writers, Jackson Foote and Emma Lov, to form the writing/production team Loote, landing cuts for Natalie La Rose.
