= Rythm Syndicate =

American R&B group

Rythm Syndicate is an R&B group from Connecticut, United States consisting of singer Evan Rogers, guitarist/keyboardist Carl Sturken, second guitarist Mike McDonald (also handling backing vocals), bassist John Nevin, saxophonist Rob Mingrino, and drummer Kevin Cloud. Rogers and Sturken were already well-established producers and songwriters, having helmed many well-received albums during the mid to late-1980s, with Rogers having also released sporadic solo albums during the decade.

The group had two hits in 1991: "P.A.S.S.I.O.N.", which reached number 2 on the Billboard Hot 100 and "Hey Donna", which attained number 13. "P.A.S.S.I.O.N." peaked at number 58 in the UK Singles Chart in July 1991. The group's releases were on the Impact Records label.

The group plans to reunite for a one-off live performance in their home state of Connecticut at the Mohegan Sun Wolf Den. The original restored "Rythm" spelling will be used for this gig to avoid confusion with another band in Ohio using the same name using "Rhythm". When the reunion will happen will depend on Sturken and Rogers' currently busy schedule of writing and producing for other artists. The predecessor band to Rythm Syndicate, Too Much Too Soon, reunited on 20 April 2013 at the Elks BPO Rockville Lodge in Ellington, CT with surviving members Kevin Cloud, David Nevin (who died in 2015), Evan Rogers, Carl Sturken, John "Noodle" Nevin, and Kirk Cloud performing (keyboardist Keith Cloud died in 1996).

== Personnel ==
- Evan Rogers (vocals)
- Carl Sturken (guitar, keyboards)
- Mike McDonald (guitar, backing vocals)
- John 'Noodle' Nevin (bass guitar)
- Rob Mingrino (vocals and saxophone)
- Kevin Cloud (drums)

== Singles ==
Year	Single	Peak chart positions								Album
Year	Single	US	US R&B/HH	US Dance	UK	NED	GER	AUS	NZ	Album
1991	"P.A.S.S.I.O.N."	2	20	32	58	51	82	28	21	Rythm Syndicate
1991	"Hey Donna"	13	79	—	—	—	—	110	—	Rythm Syndicate
1992	"Blinded by Love" (US only)	76	—	—	—	—	—	—	—	Rythm Syndicate
1992	"I Wanna Make Love To You" (US only)	73	—	—	—	—	—	—	—	Sex, Life & Love
"—" denotes releases that did not chart or were not released.

== Albums ==
- Rythm Syndicate (1991, Impact Records)
- Sex, Life & Love (1992, Impact Records; band name changed to Rhythm Syndicate, with the first letter 'h' in their band name.)

== Music videos ==
Year	Video	Director
1991	"Hey Donna"	Larry Jordan
1991	"P.A.S.S.I.O.N."	
