= Top 40 Tracks =

US music airplay chart

Top 40 Tracks was a chart from Billboard magazine. It debuted in the issue dated December 5, 1998 to preserve the notion of Hot 100 Airplay when it expanded to include airplay data from radio stations of other formats such as R&B, rock and country. The Top 40 Tracks was compiled by measuring audience impressions (based on a station's ratings and when a song is played) from Mainstream Top 40, Rhythmic Top 40, and Adult Top 40 radio stations.

The chart was discontinued effective from issue date February 12, 2005, concurrent with the introduction of the Pop 100 and Pop 100 Airplay charts.

== List of Top 40 Tracks number-one singles ==
Issue date	Song	Artist(s)	Ref.
1998
December 5	"Iris"	Goo Goo Dolls	
December 12	"Lullaby"	Shawn Mullins	
December 19	"Lullaby"	Shawn Mullins	
December 26	"Lullaby"	Shawn Mullins	
1999
January 2	"Lullaby"	Shawn Mullins	
January 9	"Lullaby"	Shawn Mullins	
January 16	"Lullaby"	Shawn Mullins	
January 23	"Lullaby"	Shawn Mullins	
January 30	"Save Tonight"	Eagle-Eye Cherry	
February 6	"Save Tonight"	Eagle-Eye Cherry	
February 13	"Angel"	Sarah McLachlan	
February 20	"Slide"	Goo Goo Dolls	
February 27	"Slide"	Goo Goo Dolls	
March 6	"Believe"	Cher	
March 13	"Believe"	Cher	
March 20	"Believe"	Cher	
March 27	"Believe"	Cher	
April 3	"Believe"	Cher	
April 10	"Every Morning"	Sugar Ray	
April 17	"Every Morning"	Sugar Ray	
April 24	"Every Morning"	Sugar Ray	
May 1	"No Scrubs"	TLC	
May 8	"Every Morning"	Sugar Ray	
May 15	"Livin' la Vida Loca"	Ricky Martin	
May 22	"Livin' la Vida Loca"	Ricky Martin	
May 29	"Livin' la Vida Loca"	Ricky Martin	
June 5	"Livin' la Vida Loca"	Ricky Martin	
June 12	"Livin' la Vida Loca"	Ricky Martin	
June 19	"Livin' la Vida Loca"	Ricky Martin	
June 26	"Livin' la Vida Loca"	Ricky Martin	
July 3	"Livin' la Vida Loca"	Ricky Martin	
July 10	"Livin' la Vida Loca"	Ricky Martin	
July 17	"Livin' la Vida Loca"	Ricky Martin	
July 24	"I Want It That Way"	Backstreet Boys	
July 31	"I Want It That Way"	Backstreet Boys	
August 7	"If You Had My Love"	Jennifer Lopez	
August 14	"All Star"	Smash Mouth	
August 21	"All Star"	Smash Mouth	
August 28	"Genie in a Bottle"	Christina Aguilera	
September 4	"Genie in a Bottle"	Christina Aguilera	
September 11	"Genie in a Bottle"	Christina Aguilera	
September 18	"Genie in a Bottle"	Christina Aguilera	
September 25	"Genie in a Bottle"	Christina Aguilera	
October 2	"Mambo No. 5"	Lou Bega	
October 9	"Mambo No. 5"	Lou Bega	
October 16	"Mambo No. 5"	Lou Bega	
October 23	"Mambo No. 5"	Lou Bega	
October 30	"Mambo No. 5"	Lou Bega	
November 6	"Mambo No. 5"	Lou Bega	
November 13	"Mambo No. 5"	Lou Bega	
November 20	"Smooth"	Santana featuring Rob Thomas	
November 27	"Smooth"	Santana featuring Rob Thomas	
December 4	"Smooth"	Santana featuring Rob Thomas	
December 11	"Smooth"	Santana featuring Rob Thomas	
December 18	"Smooth"	Santana featuring Rob Thomas	
December 25	"Smooth"	Santana featuring Rob Thomas	
2000
January 1	"Smooth"	Santana featuring Rob Thomas	
January 8	"Smooth"	Santana featuring Rob Thomas	
January 15	"Smooth"	Santana featuring Rob Thomas	
January 22	"Smooth"	Santana featuring Rob Thomas	
January 29	"What a Girl Wants"	Christina Aguilera	
February 5	"What a Girl Wants"	Christina Aguilera	
February 12	"What a Girl Wants"	Christina Aguilera	
February 19	"What a Girl Wants"	Christina Aguilera	
February 26	"I Knew I Loved You"	Savage Garden	
March 4	"Bye Bye Bye"	NSYNC	
March 11	"Bye Bye Bye"	NSYNC	
March 18	"Bye Bye Bye"	NSYNC	
March 25	"Bye Bye Bye"	NSYNC	
April 1	"Bye Bye Bye"	NSYNC	
April 8	"Bye Bye Bye"	NSYNC	
April 15	"Bye Bye Bye"	NSYNC	
April 22	"Bye Bye Bye"	NSYNC	
April 29	"Bye Bye Bye"	NSYNC	
May 6	"Bye Bye Bye"	NSYNC	
May 13	"I Try"	Macy Gray	
May 20	"I Try"	Macy Gray	
May 27	"Everything You Want"	Vertical Horizon	
June 3	"Everything You Want"	Vertical Horizon	
June 10	"Everything You Want"	Vertical Horizon	
June 17	"Everything You Want"	Vertical Horizon	
June 24	"Everything You Want"	Vertical Horizon	
July 1	"It's Gonna Be Me"	NSYNC	
July 8	"It's Gonna Be Me"	NSYNC	
July 15	"It's Gonna Be Me"	NSYNC	
July 22	"It's Gonna Be Me"	NSYNC	
July 29	"Try Again"	Aaliyah	
August 5	"Absolutely (Story of a Girl)"	Nine Days	
August 12	"Bent"	Matchbox Twenty	
August 19	"Bent"	Matchbox Twenty	
August 26	"Bent"	Matchbox Twenty	
September 2	"Bent"	Matchbox Twenty	
September 9	"Doesn't Really Matter"	Janet	
September 16	"Jumpin', Jumpin'"	Destiny's Child	
September 23	"Jumpin', Jumpin'"	Destiny's Child	
September 30	"Jumpin', Jumpin'"	Destiny's Child	
October 7	"Kryptonite"	3 Doors Down	
October 14	"Kryptonite"	3 Doors Down	
October 21	"Kryptonite"	3 Doors Down	
October 28	"Kryptonite"	3 Doors Down	
November 4	"Kryptonite"	3 Doors Down	
November 11	"With Arms Wide Open"	Creed	
November 18	"With Arms Wide Open"	Creed	
November 25	"With Arms Wide Open"	Creed	
December 2	"Independent Women Part I"	Destiny's Child	
December 9	"Independent Women Part I"	Destiny's Child	
December 16	"Independent Women Part I"	Destiny's Child	
December 23	"Independent Women Part I"	Destiny's Child	
December 30	"Independent Women Part I"	Destiny's Child	
2001
January 6	"It Wasn't Me"	Shaggy featuring Ricardo "RikRok" Ducent	
January 13	"It Wasn't Me"	Shaggy featuring Ricardo "RikRok" Ducent	
January 20	"It Wasn't Me"	Shaggy featuring Ricardo "RikRok" Ducent	
January 27	"It Wasn't Me"	Shaggy featuring Ricardo "RikRok" Ducent	
February 3	"Love Don't Cost a Thing"	Jennifer Lopez	
February 10	"Love Don't Cost a Thing"	Jennifer Lopez	
February 17	"Love Don't Cost a Thing"	Jennifer Lopez	
February 24	"Love Don't Cost a Thing"	Jennifer Lopez	
March 3	"Love Don't Cost a Thing"	Jennifer Lopez	
March 10	"Angel"	Shaggy featuring Rayvon	
March 17	"Angel"	Shaggy featuring Rayvon	
March 24	"Angel"	Shaggy featuring Rayvon	
March 31	"Angel"	Shaggy featuring Rayvon	
April 7	"Angel"	Shaggy featuring Rayvon	
April 14	"Angel"	Shaggy featuring Rayvon	
April 21	"Angel"	Shaggy featuring Rayvon	
April 28	"Survivor"	Destiny's Child	
May 5	"Survivor"	Destiny's Child	
May 12	"All for You"	Janet	
May 19	"Lady Marmalade"	Christina Aguilera, Lil' Kim, Mýa and Pink	
May 26	"Lady Marmalade"	Christina Aguilera, Lil' Kim, Mýa and Pink	
June 2	"Lady Marmalade"	Christina Aguilera, Lil' Kim, Mýa and Pink	
June 9	"Lady Marmalade"	Christina Aguilera, Lil' Kim, Mýa and Pink	
June 16	"Lady Marmalade"	Christina Aguilera, Lil' Kim, Mýa and Pink	
June 23	"Lady Marmalade"	Christina Aguilera, Lil' Kim, Mýa and Pink	
June 30	"Lady Marmalade"	Christina Aguilera, Lil' Kim, Mýa and Pink	
July 7	"Lady Marmalade"	Christina Aguilera, Lil' Kim, Mýa and Pink	
July 14	"Lady Marmalade"	Christina Aguilera, Lil' Kim, Mýa and Pink	
July 21	"Hanging by a Moment"	Lifehouse	
July 28	"Hanging by a Moment"	Lifehouse	
August 4	"Hanging by a Moment"	Lifehouse	
August 11	"Let Me Blow Ya Mind"	Eve featuring Gwen Stefani	
August 18	"Let Me Blow Ya Mind"	Eve featuring Gwen Stefani	
August 25	"Hit 'Em Up Style (Oops!)"	Blu Cantrell	
September 1	"Hit 'Em Up Style (Oops!)"	Blu Cantrell	
September 8	"Hit 'Em Up Style (Oops!)"	Blu Cantrell	
September 15	"Hit 'Em Up Style (Oops!)"	Blu Cantrell	
September 22	"Fallin'"	Alicia Keys	
September 29	"Fallin'"	Alicia Keys	
October 6	"Fallin'"	Alicia Keys	
October 13	"Fallin'"	Alicia Keys	
October 20	"Fallin'"	Alicia Keys	
October 27	"Fallin'"	Alicia Keys	
November 3	"Fallin'"	Alicia Keys	
November 10	"I'm Real"	Jennifer Lopez featuring Ja Rule	
November 17	"Family Affair"	Mary J. Blige	
November 24	"Family Affair"	Mary J. Blige	
December 1	"Family Affair"	Mary J. Blige	
December 8	"Family Affair"	Mary J. Blige	
December 15	"Family Affair"	Mary J. Blige	
December 22	"How You Remind Me"	Nickelback	
December 29	"How You Remind Me"	Nickelback	
2002
January 5	"Get the Party Started"	Pink	
January 12	"How You Remind Me"	Nickelback	
January 19	"How You Remind Me"	Nickelback	
January 26	"How You Remind Me"	Nickelback	
February 2	"How You Remind Me"	Nickelback	
February 9	"How You Remind Me"	Nickelback	
February 16	"How You Remind Me"	Nickelback	
February 23	"How You Remind Me"	Nickelback	
March 2	"How You Remind Me"	Nickelback	
March 9	"How You Remind Me"	Nickelback	
March 16	"How You Remind Me"	Nickelback	
March 23	"Ain't It Funny"	Jennifer Lopez featuring Ja Rule	
March 30	"Ain't It Funny"	Jennifer Lopez featuring Ja Rule	
April 6	"Ain't It Funny"	Jennifer Lopez featuring Ja Rule	
April 13	"Ain't It Funny"	Jennifer Lopez featuring Ja Rule	
April 20	"Ain't It Funny"	Jennifer Lopez featuring Ja Rule	
April 27	"Ain't It Funny"	Jennifer Lopez featuring Ja Rule	
May 4	"What's Luv?"	Fat Joe featuring Ashanti	
May 11	"What's Luv?"	Fat Joe featuring Ashanti	
May 18	"Foolish"	Ashanti	
May 25	"Foolish"	Ashanti	
June 1	"Foolish"	Ashanti	
June 8	"Foolish"	Ashanti	
June 15	"I Need a Girl (Part One)"	P. Diddy featuring Usher and Loon	
June 22	"Foolish"	Ashanti	
June 29	"Without Me"	Eminem	
July 6	"Hot in Herre"	Nelly	
July 13	"Hot in Herre"	Nelly	
July 20	"Hot in Herre"	Nelly	
July 27	"Complicated"	Avril Lavigne	
August 3	"Complicated"	Avril Lavigne	
August 10	"Complicated"	Avril Lavigne	
August 17	"Complicated"	Avril Lavigne	
August 24	"Complicated"	Avril Lavigne	
August 31	"Complicated"	Avril Lavigne	
September 7	"Complicated"	Avril Lavigne	
September 14	"Dilemma"	Nelly featuring Kelly Rowland	
September 21	"Dilemma"	Nelly featuring Kelly Rowland	
September 28	"Dilemma"	Nelly featuring Kelly Rowland	
October 5	"Dilemma"	Nelly featuring Kelly Rowland	
October 12	"Dilemma"	Nelly featuring Kelly Rowland	
October 19	"Dilemma"	Nelly featuring Kelly Rowland	
October 26	"Dilemma"	Nelly featuring Kelly Rowland	
November 2	"Lose Yourself"	Eminem	
November 9	"Lose Yourself"	Eminem	
November 16	"Lose Yourself"	Eminem	
November 23	"Lose Yourself"	Eminem	
November 30	"Lose Yourself"	Eminem	
December 7	"Lose Yourself"	Eminem	
December 14	"Lose Yourself"	Eminem	
December 21	"Lose Yourself"	Eminem	
December 28	"Lose Yourself"	Eminem	
2003
January 4	"Lose Yourself"	Eminem	
January 11	"Lose Yourself"	Eminem	
January 18	"Beautiful"	Christina Aguilera	
January 25	"Beautiful"	Christina Aguilera	
February 1	"Beautiful"	Christina Aguilera	
February 8	"I'm with You"	Avril Lavigne	
February 15	"I'm with You"	Avril Lavigne	
February 22	"I'm with You"	Avril Lavigne	
March 1	"All I Have"	Jennifer Lopez featuring LL Cool J	
March 8	"All I Have"	Jennifer Lopez featuring LL Cool J	
March 15	"All I Have"	Jennifer Lopez featuring LL Cool J	
March 22	"All I Have"	Jennifer Lopez featuring LL Cool J	
March 29	"In da Club"	50 Cent	
April 5	"In da Club"	50 Cent	
April 12	"In da Club"	50 Cent	
April 19	"In da Club"	50 Cent	
April 26	"In da Club"	50 Cent	
May 3	"In da Club"	50 Cent	
May 10	"Ignition (Remix)"	R. Kelly	
May 17	"Ignition (Remix)"	R. Kelly	
May 24	"Ignition (Remix)"	R. Kelly	
May 31	"Rock Your Body"	Justin Timberlake	
June 7	"Rock Your Body"	Justin Timberlake	
June 14	"Get Busy"	Sean Paul	
June 21	"Bring Me to Life"	Evanescence featuring Paul McCoy	
June 28	"Bring Me to Life"	Evanescence featuring Paul McCoy	
July 5	"Bring Me to Life"	Evanescence featuring Paul McCoy	
July 12	"Miss Independent"	Kelly Clarkson	
July 19	"Miss Independent"	Kelly Clarkson	
July 26	"Crazy in Love"	Beyoncé featuring Jay-Z	
