= P.A.S.S.I.O.N. =

1991 single by Rythm Syndicate

Single by Rythm Syndicate

from the album Rythm Syndicate
- B-side: "You Really Rock Me" (excerpt); "Hey Donna" (excerpt); "Blinded by Love" (excerpt)
- Released: 1991
- Genre: New jack swing
- Length: 3:40 (7-inch version); 4:15 (power mix)
- Label: Impact
- Songwriters: Carl Sturken; Evan Rogers
- Producers: Carl Sturken; Evan Rogers

Rythm Syndicate singles chronology
"P.A.S.S.I.O.N." (1991)	"Hey Donna" (1991)

"P.A.S.S.I.O.N." is the lead single from the eponymous debut album by American R&B band Rythm Syndicate. Written, arranged, and produced by main vocalist Evan Rogers and guitarist/keyboardist Carl Sturken, the single, released in 1991 by Impact Records, was a success on the US Billboard Hot 100, peaking at number two in August 1991. Worldwide, the song reached the top 30 in Australia, Canada, and New Zealand.

== Overview ==
The track uses a typical pop song structure and arrangement for most of each verse, but utilizes a spelling out of some words to match the cadence of the vocal; as in the end line of the second verse ("The S-E-X is just too good"). After the second verse, the chorus is repeated twice and leads into a bridge. This promptly melts into a screaming guitar solo. Nearly twenty seconds later, Rogers institutes a rap vocal, which dissipates into the chorus that repeats until the song fades out.

== Track listings ==
The excerpts from Rythm Syndicate consist of "You Really Rock Me", "Hey Donna", and "Blinded by Love".

- US 12-inch and maxi-cassette single

A1. "P.A.S.S.I.O.N." (7-inch version) – 3:40
A2. "P.A.S.S.I.O.N." (Hip hop mix) – 4:22
B1. "P.A.S.S.I.O.N." (Power mix) – 4:13
B2. "P.A.S.S.I.O.N." (House mix) – 4:22
B3. "P.A.S.S.I.O.N." (album version) – 4:13

- US cassette single; Australian 7-inch and cassette single
1. "P.A.S.S.I.O.N." (7-inch version) – 3:40
2. Excerpts from Rythm Syndicate
- US maxi-CD single
1. "P.A.S.S.I.O.N." (Hip house mix) – 6:12
2. "P.A.S.S.I.O.N." (New jack mix) – 5:48
3. "P.A.S.S.I.O.N." (LP version) – 4:13
4. "P.A.S.S.I.O.N." (House mix) – 6:55
5. "P.A.S.S.I.O.N." (extended/Power mix) – 6:44
6. "P.A.S.S.I.O.N." (Ghetto mix) – 5:12
7. "P.A.S.S.I.O.N." (acappella) – 3:12
- UK 7-inch and cassette single; Japanese mini-CD single
1. "P.A.S.S.I.O.N." (7-inch version) – 3:40
2. "P.A.S.S.I.O.N." (Power mix) – 4:13
- UK 12-inch single

A1. "P.A.S.S.I.O.N." (House mix) – 6:55
B1. "P.A.S.S.I.O.N." (Hew jack mix) – 5:48
B2. "P.A.S.S.I.O.N." (Hip house mix) – 6:12

- UK CD single
1. "P.A.S.S.I.O.N." (7-inch version)
2. "P.A.S.S.I.O.N." (House mix)
3. "P.A.S.S.I.O.N." (Power mix)
4. "P.A.S.S.I.O.N." (Ghetto mix)

== Personnel ==
- Evan Rogers: writing, vocals, arrangement, production
- Carl Sturken: writing, guitars, keyboards, arrangement, production
- Mike McDonald: guitars, vocal backing
- Rob Mingrino: saxophone (appears on "Hey Donna")
- John "Noodle" Nevin: bass, vocal backing
- Kevin Cloud: Drums, percussion
- Darroll Gustamacho: recording, mixing

== Charts ==
=== Weekly charts ===
Chart (1991)	Peak position
Australia (ARIA)	28
Canada Top Singles (RPM)	25
Canada Dance/Urban (RPM)	8
Germany (GfK)	82
Netherlands (Single Top 100)	51
New Zealand (Recorded Music NZ)	21
UK Singles (Official Charts)	58
UK Airplay (Music Week)	56
US Billboard Hot 100	2
US 12-inch Singles Sales (Billboard)	12
US Dance Club Play (Billboard)	32
US Hot R&B Singles (Billboard)	20

=== Year-end charts ===
Chart (1991)	Position
US Billboard Hot 100	40
US Cash Box Top 100	22

== Release history ==
Region	Date	Format(s)	Label(s)	Ref.
United States	1991	12-inch vinyl; CD; cassette	Impact	
Australia	July 1, 1991	7-inch vinyl; CD; cassette	Impact	
United Kingdom	July 15, 1991	7-inch vinyl; 12-inch vinyl; CD; cassette	Impact American	
Australia	July 22, 1991	12-inch vinyl	Impact	
Japan	July 26, 1991	Mini-CD	Impact	
