= Soldier of Love (Donny Osmond song) =

- Artwork for US and UK singles

Single by Donny Osmond

from the album Donny Osmond
- B-side: "My Secret Touch"; "Time Can't Erase"; "Groove"
- Released: 1988
- Genre: Pop
- Length: 3:49
- Label: Capitol; Virgin
- Songwriter: Carl Sturken and Evan Rogers
- Producer: Carl Sturken and Evan Rogers

Donny Osmond singles chronology
""I'm in It for Love"" (1987)	"Soldier of Love" (1988)	""If It's Love That You Want"" (1988)

Music video
- "Soldier of Love" by Donny Osmond on YouTube

"Soldier of Love" is a 1988 song by American singer Donny Osmond, which became his comeback hit. It first was a Top 30 hit in the UK in 1988 and "Soldier of Love" reached number two on the Billboard Hot 100 in 1989, becoming his sixth and last top-10 hit.

== Background ==
Osmond had spent most of the 1980s out of the public spotlight due to frustration with his teen idol typecasting and desire to focus on raising his family; it was largely left to his brothers to recover the family's debts from their late 1970s TV series and the expensive Utah studios built for the venture. By the late 1980s, with the debts paid off and older brother Alan Osmond's 1987 diagnosis of multiple sclerosis halting the family's touring, Donny returned to the studio.

The track was not initially released in the US as Osmond did not have a record deal there. However, a cassette of the song from a British import was sent by an Osmond fan to Jessica Ettinger, the acting Program Director and Music Director at ABC's WPLJ-FM New York. Ettinger liked the song but was concerned that Osmond, a former child star, wouldn't be accepted by the current pop audience.

Ettinger, believing the song to be a hit, up-ended the top 40 music and radio industry by giving it a slot on her playlist. Osmond was not only unsigned by any record label in the US, but the song itself was unavailable for purchase in the US at the time. To give the song a chance, she created a "mystery artist" promotion; put the song in rotation, and kept listeners guessing who the artist was for several weeks. Eventually, Ettinger had her air talent reveal that the song was by Donny Osmond, who appeared live on the air at the same time. Osmond was soon signed by Capitol Records, which copied Ettinger's promotion idea nationwide and released the song as a single. Osmond credits Ettinger with re-launching his career by listening to the music and not pre-judging whether a song could be a hit based on the name of the artist.

The song is set to a post-disco beat. Songwriters are Carl Sturken and Evan Rogers. The music video for the song was by John Scarlett Davis and produced by Nick Verden for Radar Films. Shot on location at London's Docklands.

== Charts ==
=== Weekly charts ===
Weekly chart performance for "Soldier of Love"
Chart (1988–1989)	Peak position
Canada Top Singles (RPM)	3
UK Singles (Official Charts)	29
US Billboard Hot 100	2
US Adult Contemporary (Billboard)	20
US Cash Box Top 100	2

=== Year-end charts ===
Year-end chart performance for "Soldier of Love"
Chart (1989)	Position
Canada Top Singles (RPM)	66
US Billboard Hot 100	57
