= A Moment Like This =

2002 single by Kelly Clarkson

Single by Kelly Clarkson
- A-side: "Before Your Love"
- Released: September 17, 2002
- Recorded: 2002
- Studio: Westlake (Hollywood, California); Rokstone (London, England)
- Genre: Pop
- Length: 3:49
- Label: 19; RCA
- Songwriters: Jörgen Elofsson; John Reid
- Producers: Stephen Ferrera; Steve Mac

Kelly Clarkson singles chronology
"A Moment Like This" / "Before Your Love" (2002)	"Miss Independent" (2003)

Music video
- "A Moment Like This" on YouTube

"A Moment Like This" is a song by American singer Kelly Clarkson, released as her debut single. The song was written by Jörgen Elofsson and John Reid from British house music project Nightcrawlers and produced by Stephen Ferrera and Steve Mac. The song was issued as a double A-side with "Before Your Love" as Clarkson's coronation single after winning the first season of American Idol. A remixed version of the song was later included on her debut studio album, Thankful (2003). "A Moment Like This" was a huge hit in North America, topping the US Billboard Hot 100 and the Canadian Singles Chart.

In 2006, the song was recorded and released by British singer Leona Lewis, the winner of the third series of The X Factor. Her version was the Christmas number one for 2006, outselling the rest of the top 40 combined. Lewis' version has sold 914,000 copies as of 2015.

== Background ==
The song was co-written by Jörgen Elofsson and John Reid (of dance act Nightcrawlers), produced by Stephen Ferrera and Steve Mac, and mixed by Andy Zulla. It was written to be the first single for the winner of the first season of American Idol. As a result, the four remaining finalists, Kelly Clarkson, Justin Guarini, Nikki McKibbin, and Tamyra Gray each recorded a version of the song in case they won. The song was first revealed to the public when Guarini and Clarkson competed in a final showdown while singing this song, along with another track, "Before Your Love". After the American public had voted, Guarini performed the song (and Clarkson performed "Before Your Love") at the final show before the results were revealed. When Clarkson was announced as the winner, she became emotional, and sang the song as her final performance.

"Before Your Love", was also given to radio and had a video shot, which debuted on MTV's Total Request Live before "A Moment Like This" did; however, it failed to achieve the level of success of "A Moment Like This", but shares the Gold certification as a double-a sided single.

"A Moment Like This/Before Your Love" was certified gold by RIAA on October 18, 2002. As of June 4, 2009, the single has sold approximately 1,047,000 copies.

On March 5, 2013, Billboard ranked the song number 11 in its list of Top 100 American Idol Hits of All Time.

== Composition ==
The song moves at a tempo of 73 beats per minute in common time. The first two verses are in the key of E♭ minor, and the chorus after each verse transitions to A♭ major. The final chorus modulates to B♭ major. Clarkson's vocals span from A♭_{3} to F_{5}.

== Critical reception ==
This song received moderately positive reviews. Entertainment Weekly editor Henry Goldblatt wrote about Clarkson's performance of the song on American Idol: "the woman whose tears during her winning rendition of A Moment Like This were so heartfelt, grown men cried along with her." David Browne, also of Entertainment Weekly, wrote: "A choir at the end of "A Moment Like This" is meant to indicate earthiness." Arion Berger of Rolling Stone wrote that this song "signaled that Kelly might be headed toward the Mariah-Whitney-Celine radio-ballad sausage mill." Sal Cinquemani of Slant Magazine wrote that this song is "Adult Contemporary goo. AllMusic senior editor Stephen Thomas Erlewine wrote that the song "may have been a number one hit, but it was such a staid adult contemporary tune that it suggested that her career was over before it really began, since it was not a work that played to her age or audience, and it gave her no room to grow." He also marked this song as a standout on album Thankful. The Huffington Post ranked the song at number 11 on "The 33 Greatest Pop Divas' Debut Singles" list.

== Chart performance ==
As the first single ever from American Idol, much pressure was put on "A Moment Like This" to perform well. The debut single from Will Young, the winner of the United Kingdom's Pop Idol (the forerunner to American Idol), sold 1.2 million copies in its first week, becoming the fastest-selling British debut single of all time; however, critics argued that the American singles market was different from the British market. The single became a hit in the U.S., debuting at number 60 on the Billboard Hot 100 on September 21, 2002, and reaching number one on its third week on the chart. It sold 236,000 in its first week. It topped the Billboard Hot 100 for two consecutive weeks and remained on the chart for 20 consecutive weeks. Sales of the commercial single also helped the song (as evidenced by its number-one peak on the Hot 100 Singles Sales) break records.

On the Billboard issue dated October 5, 2002, the song topped the Hot 100 chart with a single-week jump of 51 positions, the largest single-week jump to number one on the Hot 100. She held that record until Maroon 5's "Makes Me Wonder" single-week jump 63 positions to number one, on May 12, 2007. Clarkson would break the record again when her song "My Life Would Suck Without You" jumped 96 spots from 97 to 1 on February 7, 2009.

== Music video ==
The music video for "A Moment Like This" was directed by Antti J. It has Clarkson exploring a vacant theatre, where she takes the stage to sing and perform the song.

Clips of her singing on American Idol and getting emotional when she won the competition are also shown.

== Track listing ==
CD single
No.	Title	Writer(s)	Producer(s)	Length
1.	"Before Your Love"	Desmond Child; Cathy Dennis; Gary Burr	Child; Dennis	4:00
2.	"A Moment Like This"	Jörgen Elofsson; John Reid	Stephen Ferrera; Steve Mac	3:50

DVD single
No.	Title	Length
1.	"Before Your Love" (Music video)	3:52
2.	"A Moment Like This" (Music video)	3:47

== Charts ==
=== Weekly charts ===
2002–2006 weekly chart performance for "A Moment Like This"
Chart (2002–2006)	Peak position
Canada (Nielsen SoundScan)	1
Canada Radio (Nielsen BDS)	20
Canada AC (Nielsen BDS)	20
Canada CHR/Top 40 (Nielsen BDS)	10
UK Singles Downloads (Official Charts)	56
US Billboard Hot 100	1
US Adult Contemporary (Billboard)	4
US Adult Pop Airplay (Billboard)	27
US Hot Country Songs (Billboard)	58
US Pop Airplay (Billboard)	4

2013 weekly chart performance for "A Moment Like This"
Chart (2013)	Peak position
South Korea International (Circle)	74

=== Year-end charts ===
2002 year-end chart performance for "A Moment Like This"
Chart (2002)	Position
Canada (Nielsen SoundScan)	1
US Billboard Hot 100	39
US Adult Contemporary (Billboard)	36
US Mainstream Top 40 (Billboard)	60

2003 year-end chart performance for "A Moment Like This"
Chart (2003)	Position
US Adult Contemporary (Billboard)	22

== Certifications ==
Certifications for "A Moment Like This"
Region	Certification	Certified units/sales
Canada (Music Canada)	2× Platinum	20,000^{^}
United States (RIAA)	Gold	738,000 (Digital); 627,000 (Physical)
^{^} Shipments figures based on certification alone.

== Release history ==
Release history and formats for "A Moment Like This"
Region	Date	Format	Label	Ref.
United States	September 17, 2002	CD	RCA	
United States	November 26, 2002	DVD	RCA	

== Leona Lewis version ==
"A Moment Like This"

Single by Leona Lewis

from the album Spirit
- Released: December 17, 2006
- Recorded: 2006
- Studio: Angel Studios (London, England); Rokstone Studios (London, England); Sphere Studios (London, England)
- Length: 4:17
- Label: Syco
- Songwriters: Jörgen Elofsson; John Reid
- Producer: Steve Mac

Leona Lewis singles chronology
"A Moment Like This" (2006)	"Bleeding Love" (2007)

Music video
- "Leona Lewis - A Moment Like This (Official Video)" on YouTube

=== Release ===
In December 2006, British singer Leona Lewis, who went on to win the third series of The X Factor, covered "A Moment Like This" as her debut single. Lewis was chosen as the winner on the night of December 16, when the live finale aired. The cover was made available for digital download the following day. The physical single was rush-released on Wednesday, December 20–which was unusual as most new singles were released on Mondays to gain maximum amount of sales for the UK Singles Chart the following Sunday–due to Lewis being crowned only four days prior.

=== Accolades ===
In January 2007, "A Moment Like This" was shortlisted for the British Single award at the 2007 Brit Awards. It made it to the second round but was eliminated and did not make it to the final selection. In May, it won the Ivor Novello Award for Best-Selling British Single.

=== Commercial performance ===
Lewis' version of "A Moment Like This" broke a world record after it was downloaded 50,000 times within just 30 minutes of release. It sold over 101,000 copies on its first day on sale, setting the record for the fastest-selling The X Factor winner's single. (Note: The record would later be beaten by Alexandra Burke in 2008, and then again by James Arthur in 2012.) The song debuted atop the UK Singles Chart dated December 24, thus becoming the Christmas number one for 2006, and spent three additional weeks at the summit. It went on to become the most downloaded song and the second best-selling single of 2006 in the United Kingdom.

"A Moment Like This" peaked atop the Irish Singles Chart, staying at the summit for six weeks. On January 4, 2007, it peaked at number three on the European Hot 100 Singles. The single was certified platinum by the British Phonographic Industry (BPI) on January 5. After the release of Lewis's second single "Bleeding Love", "A Moment Like This" re-entered the UK Singles Chart at number 55 on October 28. According to the Official Charts Company (OCC), the single has sold 943,000 copies in the UK as of December 2015.

=== Music video ===
The accompanying music video for "A Moment Like This" was directed by JT. Like Clarkson's, it's simple, featuring Lewis singing the song on a stage. It also features several clips from Lewis' time on The X Factor, from her first audition to the moment she was announced as the winner. Simon Cowell, Sharon Osbourne, Louis Walsh, Kate Thornton and Ray Quinn are all featured within The X Factor clips.

=== Track listings and formats ===
UK digital download
No.	Title	Writer(s)	Producer(s)	Length
1.	"A Moment Like This"	Jörgen Elofsson; John Reid	Steve Mac	4:17

UK maxi CD single and digital EP
No.	Title	Writer(s)	Producer(s)	Length
1.	"A Moment Like This"	Elofsson; Reid	Mac	4:17
2.	"Summertime"	DuBose Heyward; George Gershwin	Nigel Wright	2:27
3.	"Sorry Seems to Be the Hardest Word"	Elton John; Bernie Taupin	Wright	2:52

=== Charts ===
==== Weekly charts ====
Weekly chart performance for "A Moment Like This"
Chart (2006–2022)	Peak position
European Hot 100 Singles (Billboard)	3
Hungary (Single Top 40)	31
Ireland (IRMA)	1
Scottish Singles Sales (Official Charts)	1
UK Singles (Official Charts)	1
UK Singles Downloads (Official Charts)	1

==== Year-end charts ====
2006 year-end chart performance for "A Moment Like This"
Chart (2006)	Position
Ireland (IRMA)	7
UK Singles (OCC)	2

2007 year-end chart performance for "A Moment Like This"
Chart (2007)	Position
European Hot 100 Singles (Billboard)	80

=== Certifications ===
Certifications and sales for "A Moment Like This"
Region	Certification	Certified units/sales
United Kingdom (BPI)	Platinum	943,000

=== Release history ===
Release history and formats for "A Moment Like This"
Region	Date	Format(s)	Label(s)	Ref.
United Kingdom	December 17, 2006	Contemporary hit radio; digital download	Syco	
United Kingdom	December 20, 2006	Digital download (EP); maxi CD	Syco	
