= Addicted Tour =

2006 concert tour by Kelly Clarkson

- Tour by Kelly Clarkson
- Cover artwork of the tour program
- Associated album: Breakaway
- Start date: June 30, 2006
- End date: August 6, 2006
- Legs: 1
- No. of shows: 25 in North America

Kelly Clarkson concert chronology
- The Breakaway Tour (2005–2006); Addicted Tour (2006); My December Tour (2007–08)

The Addicted Tour was the third headlining concert tour by American pop singer Kelly Clarkson. It was a United States tour beginning on June 30, 2006, in West Palm Beach, Florida and ended on August 6, in Auburn, Washington. The tour was in support of her second studio album, Breakaway (2004), following The Breakaway Tour (2005–06) and Hazel Eyes Tour (2005).

== Show synopsis ==
The show begins pitch black with the music of "Addicted" being played, then there is a silhouette of one of the band members on violin. After a few measures of him playing, a silhouette of Clarkson appears. When the violinist stops playing Clarkson begins to sing "It's like I can't breathe" and the curtain comes up in one swift motion. She then goes into the rest of the chorus and finishes the rest of the song. Clarkson ended the night with "Since U Been Gone"

The tour's set list includes songs that would later appear on Clarkson's third studio album My December (2007).

== Opening act ==
- Rooney

== Setlist ==
1. "Addicted"
2. "I Hate Myself For Losing You"
3. "Behind These Hazel Eyes"
4. "Maybe"
5. "Gone"
6. "Anymore"
7. "Shelter" (Ray LaMontagne cover)
8. "Because of You"
9. "Thankful"
10. "Home" (Marc Broussard cover)
11. Miss Independent"
12. "Go"
13. "Beautiful Disaster"
14. "Hear Me"
15. "Yeah"
16. "Walk Away"

Encore

17. "Breakaway"
18. "Since U Been Gone"

Notes

- "Maybe" and "Yeah" would end up on Clarkson's third My December (2007).

== Tour dates ==
Date	City (All U.S.)	Venue
June 30, 2006	West Palm Beach	Sound Advice Amphitheater
July 1, 2006	Tampa	Ford Amphitheatre
July 3, 2006	Raleigh	Alltel Pavilion at Walnut Creek
July 4, 2006	Charlotte	Verizon Wireless Amphitheatre
July 6, 2006	Bristow	Nissan Pavilion at Stone Ridge
July 7, 2006	Virginia Beach	Verizon Wireless Amphitheater
July 9, 2006	Holmdel	PNC Bank Arts Center
July 10, 2006	Darien Center	Darien Lake Performing Arts Center
July 12, 2006	Wantagh	Nikon at Jones Beach Theater
July 13, 2006	Wantagh	Nikon at Jones Beach Theater
July 15, 2006	Hartford	New England Dodge Music Center
July 16, 2006	Mansfield	Xfinity Center
July 18, 2006	Camden	Tweeter Center at the Waterfront
July 19, 2006	Burgettstown	Post-Gazette Pavilion
July 21, 2006	Bonner Springs	Verizon Wireless Amphitheatre
July 22, 2006	Tinley Park	First Midwest Bank Amphitheatre
July 24, 2006	Maryland Heights	UMB Bank Pavilion
July 25, 2006	Noblesville	Verizon Wireless Music Center
July 28, 2006	Dallas	Smirnoff Music Centre
July 29, 2006	The Woodlands	Cynthia Woods Mitchell Pavilion
July 31, 2006	Phoenix	Cricket Wireless Pavilion
August 1, 2006	Irvine	Verizon Wireless Amphitheatre
August 3, 2006	Mountain View	Shoreline Amphitheatre
August 4, 2006	Wheatland	Sleep Train Amphitheatre
August 6, 2006	Auburn	White River Amphitheatre

== Box office score data ==
Venue	City	Attendance	Gross revenue
Nissan Pavilion at Stone Ridge	Bristow	16,167 / 22,502 (72%)	$572,728
Verizon Wireless Amphitheatre	Virginia Beach	15,314 / 15,314 (100%)	$449,590
PNC Bank Arts Center	Holmdel Township	16,973 / 16,973 (100%)	$681,309
Darien Lake Performing Arts Center	Darien	13,209 / 13,209 (100%)	$406,590
Nikon at Jones Beach Theater	Wantagh	27,969 / 27,969 (100%)	$1,385,535
New England Dodge Music Center	Hartford	12,524 / 12,524 (100%)	$459,057
Tweeter Center for the Performing Arts	Mansfield	17,072 / 17,072 (100%)	$840,135
Tweeter Center at the Waterfront	Camden	20,778 / 20,778 (100%)	$747,431
First Midwest Bank Amphitheatre	Tinley Park	19,620 / 19,620 (100%)	$682,027
TOTAL		159,626 / 165,961 (96%)	$6,224,402
