= Hazel Eyes Tour =

2005 concert tour by Kelly Clarkson

- Tour by Kelly Clarkson
- Cover artwork of the tour program
- Associated album: Breakaway
- Start date: June 29, 2005
- End date: December 18, 2005
- Legs: 2
- No. of shows: 49 in North America; 49 total

Kelly Clarkson concert chronology
- The Breakaway Tour
  (2005–06)
- Hazel Eyes Tour
  (2005)
- The Breakaway Tour
  (2005)
The Breakaway Tour (2005)	Hazel Eyes Tour (2005)	The Breakaway Tour (2006)

The Hazel Eyes Tour was the second headlining concert tour by American pop singer Kelly Clarkson. It was the second tour launched in support of her sophomore studio album Breakaway (2004), following The Breakaway Tour (2005). It began on June 29, 2005, in Del Mar, California and finished on December 18, 2005, in Spokane, Washington. Clarkson embarked on two legs of this tour before and in between the Australian and European legs of The Breakaway Tour. The July 17, concert at the UCF Arena in Orlando, Florida was streamed live on AOL and AOL Radio.

== Opening acts ==
- Graham Colton Band North America

== Setlist ==
1. "Walk Away"
2. "Miss Independent"
3. "I Hate Myself for Losing You"
4. "Low"
5. "What's Up Lonely"
6. "The Trouble with Love Is"
7. "Addicted"
8. "Because of You"
9. "Why" (Annie Lennox cover)
10. "Where is Your Heart"
11. "Gone"
12. "Come Here"
13. "Behind These Hazel Eyes"
14. "Beautiful Disaster"
15. "Hear Me"
16. "Since U Been Gone"

Encore

17. "Breakaway"

Notes

- "Blue Christmas" was performed during shows in December.

== Tour dates ==
Date	City	Country	Venue
North America Leg 1
June 29, 2005^{[A]}	Del Mar	United States	Harrah's Grandstand Stage
July 1, 2005	Kelseyville	United States	Konocti Field Amphitheatre
July 2, 2005^{[B]}	Salt Lake City	United States	Rice-Eccles Stadium
July 4, 2005^{[C]}	Greeley	United States	Island Grove Regional Park
July 6, 2005	Lubbock	United States	Lubbock Municipal Coliseum
July 7, 2005	Austin	United States	Frank Erwin Center
July 9, 2005	San Antonio	United States	San Antonio Municipal Auditorium
July 14, 2005	Hollywood	United States	Hard Rock Live
July 15, 2005	Estero	United States	Germain Arena
July 17, 2005	Orlando	United States	UCF Arena
July 18, 2005	Jacksonville	United States	Moran Theater
July 20, 2005	Birmingham	United States	Boutwell Memorial Auditorium
July 21, 2005	Nashville	United States	Grand Ole Opry House
July 23, 2005	Knoxville	United States	Memorial Civic Coliseum
July 24, 2005	Charlotte	United States	Cricket Arena
July 26, 2005	Norfolk	United States	Constant Convocation Center
July 27, 2005	Atlantic City	United States	Borgata Event Center
July 29, 2005	Pittsburgh	United States	Palumbo Center
July 30, 2005^{[D]}	Toms River	United States	Ritacco Center
August 1, 2005	Binghamton	United States	Broome County Veterans Memorial Arena
August 2, 2005	Portland	United States	Cumberland County Civic Center
August 4, 2005	Manchester	United States	Verizon Wireless Arena
August 5, 2005	Uncasville	United States	Mohegan Sun Arena
August 7, 2005	Wilkes-Barre	United States	Wachovia Arena
August 8, 2005	Hershey	United States	Giant Center
August 10, 2005	Ottawa	Canada	WordPerfect Theatre
August 11, 2005	Kitchener	Canada	Centre In The Square
August 13, 2005	Chicago	United States	Charter One Pavilion
August 14, 2005	Ashwaubenon	United States	Resch Center
August 16, 2005	Battle Creek	United States	Kellogg Arena
August 17, 2005	Clarkston	United States	DTE Energy Music Theatre
August 19, 2005	Trotwood	United States	Hara Arena
August 20, 2005	St. Louis	United States	Fox Theatre
August 22, 2005	Toledo	United States	SeaGate Convention Centre
August 24, 2005	Memphis	United States	Mud Island Amphitheater
August 26, 2005	West Lafayette	United States	Elliott Hall of Music
August 29, 2005	Denver	United States	The Lecture Hall
August 30, 2005	Salt Lake City	United States	Abravanel Hall
September 1, 2005	Bozeman	United States	Worthington Arena
September 2, 2005	Nampa	United States	Idaho Center Amphitheater
September 4, 2005	Berkeley	United States	Hearst Greek Theatre
North America Leg 2
December 7, 2005	Hidalgo	United States	Dodge Arena
December 8, 2005	Corpus Christi	United States	American Bank Center
December 10, 2005	Las Vegas	United States	Aladdin Theatre for the Performing Arts
December 11, 2005	Temecula	United States	Pechanga Showroom Theater
December 13, 2005	Fresno	United States	Save Mart Center
December 15, 2005	Irvine	United States	Bren Events Center
December 16, 2005	Reno	United States	Reno Events Center
December 18, 2005	Spokane	United States	Star Theatre

Festivals and other miscellaneous performances
^{A} This concert was a part of the "San Diego County Fair"
^{B} This concert was a part of "Freedom Blast"
^{C} This concert was a part of the "Greeley Stampede"
^{D} This concert was a part of "Toms River Fest"

Cancellations and rescheduled shows

July 10, 2005	New Orleans	UNO Lakefront Arena	Rescheduled to September 15, 2005
July 12, 2005	Pensacola, Florida	Pensacola Civic Center	Rescheduled to September 16, 2005 due to the effects of Hurricane Dennis
August 17, 2005	Saginaw	Wendler Arena	Moved to DTE Energy Music Theatre
September 5, 2005	Santa Barbara	Santa Barbara Bowl	Cancelled
September 7, 2005	Irvine, California	Bren Events Center	Rescheduled to December 15, 2005
September 9, 2005	Reno, Nevada	Reno Events Center	Rescheduled to December 16, 2005
September 10, 2005	Las Vegas, Nevada	Aladdin Theatre for the Performing Arts	Rescheduled to December 10, 2005
September 12, 2005	Spokane, Washington	Star Theater	Rescheduled to December 18, 2005
September 13, 2005	Puyallup, Washington	Puyallup Fairgrounds	Cancelled. This concert was a part of the "Puyallup Fair".
September 15, 2005	New Orleans, Louisiana	UNO Lakefront Arena	Cancelled
September 16, 2005	Pensacola, Florida	Pensacola Civic Center	Cancelled

== Box office score data ==
Venue	City	Attendance	Gross revenue
Aladdin Theatre for the Performing Arts	Las Vegas	7,019 / 7,019 (100%)	$258,414
TOTAL		7,019 / 7,019 (100%)	$258,414
