= Walk Away (Kelly Clarkson song) =

2006 single by Kelly Clarkson

Single by Kelly Clarkson

from the album Breakaway
- Released: January 17, 2006
- Studio: Whitecoat Sound (Malibu, California); NRG (West Hollywood, California); Henson (Los Angeles)
- Genre: Pop rock
- Length: 3:08
- Label: RCA
- Songwriters: Kelly Clarkson; Kara DioGuardi; Chantal Kreviazuk; Raine Maida
- Producers: Kara DioGuardi; Chantal Kreviazuk; Raine Maida

Kelly Clarkson singles chronology
| "Because of You" (2005) | "Walk Away" (2006) | "Never Again" (2007) |

Music video
- "Walk Away" on YouTube

"Walk Away" is a song by American pop singer Kelly Clarkson for her second studio album, Breakaway (2004). The song was written and produced by Chantal Kreviazuk, Raine Maida, and Kara DioGuardi, with additional writing from Clarkson. The song focuses on a relationship that is not working out; Clarkson wants a lover who will support her, not disappear when she needs him the most.

It was released as the album's fourth single. The song received generally positive reviews from music critics, who commended Clarkson's attitude on the song. The song reached the top ten in The Republic of Ireland and the top forty in Australia, Austria, Germany, New Zealand, and the United Kingdom. In March 2006, the single was certified gold by the Recording Industry Association of America (RIAA) for sales over 500,000 in all formats in the United States. As of February 2010, "Walk Away" has sold over 1.1 million digital copies in the U.S.

== Background ==
Clarkson called "Walk Away" "one of the brighter songs" on Breakaway, and said that "It's just one of those anthem songs where everybody is [bouncing their heads] in the car." She said of its subject matter, "the whole song is just about if it's not working out, then just leave, don't stay and make it worse." After spawning four major top 10 singles ("Breakaway," "Since U Been Gone," "Behind These Hazel Eyes," and "Because of You") and spending sixty weeks in the top 20 of the Billboard albums chart, Clarkson released "Walk Away" as the fifth single.

== Composition ==
"Walk Away" was written by Clarkson, Chantal Kreviazuk, Raine Maida and Kara DioGuardi and produced by Maida, DioGuardi and Kreviazuk. It is one of five collaborations with DioGuardi from the album and the first and only to be released as a single. DioGuardi had become one of the most sought songwriter/producers after playing key roles on hits from Ashlee Simpson's "Pieces of Me" to Lindsay Lohan's "Confessions of a Broken Heart." For additional insurance Canadian couple Chantal Kreviazuk and Raine Maida, frequent Avril Lavigne collaborators, assisted on "Walk Away."

"Walk Away"
A pop song.

Tense guitars open the song, setting a cross tone. In "Walk Away," Clarkson's relationship with her boyfriend seemed to be sunk at the start. With his family conspiring against them and aiding in his deceptions, there was no way it was going to work. Clarkson's hurt not only stems from his indifference to her, but his family's animosity towards her. "You've got your mother and your brother/ Every other undercover/ Tellin' you what to say/", she sings. In the chorus, he asks her whether or not they should continue dating: "I'm looking for attention/ Not another question/ Should you stay or should you go?/ Well, if you don't have the answer/ Why you still standin' here?/ Hey, hey, hey, hey/Just walk away." In the second verse, she says that he stood up her plenty of evenings. However, each time she believed he would be there. After the chorus is the heated bridge. Clarkson says she wants a relationship where the guy loves her as passionately as she does him. She wants a lover who will support her, not disappear when she needs him the most. She asks if he thinks the relationship is worth fighting for. "I wanna love/ I want a fire/ To feel the burn/ My desires/ I wanna man by my side/ Not a boy who runs and hides/ Are you gonna fight for me?/ Die for me?/ Live and breathe for me?/ Do you care for me?/ 'Cause if you don't then just leave," she sings.

== Reception ==
=== Critical response ===
Pam Avoledo of Blogcritics wrote that "[...] Clarkson vocals fiery and smoldering. She's come a long way from American Idol where she had the sing songs technically perfect with the emotion optional. However, in the single, she unleashes whatever anger she felt from a past breakup and puts it in the song."

Stephen Thomas Erlewine from AllMusic described the song as a "driving, anthemic pop tune" and picked it as one of the album's best tracks. Robert Christgau named it a "prefab kissoff". Charles Merwin from Stylus Magazine wrote that "Luckily, songs like 'Breakaway' and 'Walk Away' are good enough to make you forget about some disappointments on the album." On March 5, 2013, Billboard ranked the song at number 20 in its list of Top 100 American Idol Hits of All Time.

=== Chart performance ===
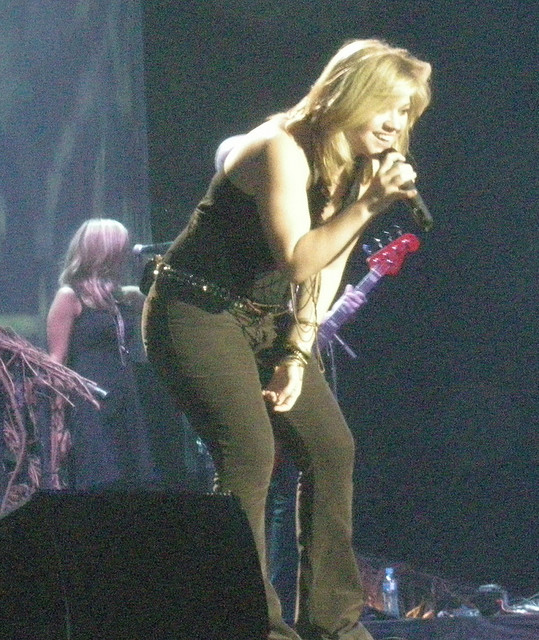
Clarkson performed "Walk Away" in all of her concert tours, as it is one of her most popular songs.

"Walk Away" debuted on the U.S. Billboard Hot 100 at number 97 on the chart dated January 21, 2006. "Walk Away" became Breakaway's first release to fail to achieve top 10 status on the Billboard Hot 100, peaking at number 12. In the United Kingdom, the song debuted and peaked at number 21. In Australia, on the ARIA Single Chart, the song debuted at number 29 and, during its fourth week on the chart, peaked at number 27. As of September 2017, the song has sold over 1,306,000 copies in the United States.

== Music video ==
The music video for "Walk Away" was developed from a treatment Clarkson had written and was directed by Joseph Kahn. The video premiered on British music channels on March 6, 2006, and on TRL and MuchOnDemand on March 7. Of the fifty days it was eligible for the TRL top 10 video countdown, it was at number one 19 times, including on its last day, June 1. The video was voted 30th in VH1's "Top 40 Videos of the Year" for 2006. Kelly wrote the treatment for the video, even writing in a scene for her brother and one of her friends. She shot the video in Los Angeles. Clarkson said of the music video:

"The last two were a bit darker, so I decided to write a happier treatment. I usually tell the story, like with 'Hazel Eyes' and the same with 'Because of You,' but this one we wanted to make a bit more fun. I don't want to give it away, but it's a very funny video."

It opens with an alarm clock waking up at several times and video is shown Clarkson singing her song live. Other people shown are a man showering, a woman at an office, a little girl in her bedroom, twin brothers in the sports hall changing rooms, a football player, a man cleaning his house with a vacuum cleaner, a hairstylist, a waitress and a cleaning man at a café, a man on the road in the traffic, men in the restroom (one of the men was played by Clarkson's brother, Jason Clarkson) and an officer standing by a car all, lip-syncing.

During the bridge section, a man gets out the car and dances by the traffic and singing along. Another man sings along in a car, and he eventually gets out of the car to dance, holding up traffic. The video is intercut with shots of Clarkson performing the song and dancing like David Lee Roth with her band. At one point, Clarkson stops singing and rolls her eyes while smiling when it’s shown that one of the cameramen is lip-syncing. During the final chorus, glitter falls on Kelly Clarkson and her band. As the song ends, a man from the bathroom stall looks at the other guy dancing, who walks away, only for him to start dancing, with other scenes showing the lady still dancing in the office with the camera showing a confused boss looking at her, the cleaning man being looked at by a disguised waitress, who shakes her head and walks away from him, and the little girl dancing before the camera reveals her older sister watching her. After her performance, Clarkson walks away, knocking her microphone stand down and shows the officer giving the driver a ticket.

== Live performances ==
Clarkson has performed the song in every one of her concert tours since The Breakaway Tour (2005–06). On the Stronger Tour (2012), Clarkson performed the song as part of a medley, with "The Trouble With Love Is", "How I Feel" and "I Want You". When Clarkson performed the song during the 12th Annual Honda Civic Tour, where she was a special guest for Maroon 5, she and her music director changed the arrangement to make it sound more jazzy. For her Piece by Piece Tour (2015) Clarkson mashed the song up with "Uptown Funk" by Mark Ronson and Bruno Mars.

Clarkson has also performed the song on Live with Regis and Kelly, The Ellen DeGeneres Show, and at half time during the 2007 Dallas Cowboys Thanksgiving Football game. In April 2011, Clarkson appeared on The Ellen DeGeneres Show at Universal Studios Florida in Orlando, and performed the song in a medley of hits along with "Miss Independent" and "Since U Been Gone".

== Track listings ==
Digital single

1. "Walk Away" – 3:08
2. "Walk Away" (Chris Cox radio remix) – 3:38

Digital EP

1. "Walk Away" – 3:08
2. "Since U Been Gone" (Live@Rollingstone.com) – 3:13
3. "Walk Away" (Chris Cox radio remix) – 3:38
4. "Walk Away" (Ralphi Rosario Radio Mix) – 3:56

Remixes EP

1. "Walk Away" (Craig J radio mix) – 3:30
2. "Walk Away" (Chris Cox full on club mix) – 10:11
3. "Walk Away" (Ralphi Rosario's I Want a Man dub) – 10:14
4. "Walk Away" (Craig J Big Love mixshow) – 5:23
5. "Walk Away" – 3:08

Dance vault mixes

1. "Walk Away" (Craig J radio mix) – 3:30
2. "Walk Away" (Ralph Rosario main club) – 9:56
3. "Walk Away" (Ralph Rosario Walk Away Beats) – 9:43
4. "Walk Away" (Craig J's Big Love a cappella) – 5:23

Dance vault mixes 4

1. "Walk Away" (Craig J's Big Love club) – 6:33
2. "Walk Away" (Craig J's Padapella) – 3:46
3. "Walk Away" (Chris Cox TwEaKed dub) – 6:38
4. "Walk Away" (Ralph Rosario a cappella) – 3:27

== Charts ==
=== Weekly charts ===
| Chart (2006) | Peak position |
|---|---|
| Australia (ARIA) | 27 |
| Austria (Ö3 Austria Top 40) | 29 |
| Belgium (Ultratip Bubbling Under Flanders) | 2 |
| Belgium (Ultratip Bubbling Under Wallonia) | 6 |
| Canada CHR/Pop (Radio & Records) | 3 |
| Canada Hot AC (Radio & Records) | 1 |
| Germany (GfK) | 30 |
| Ireland (IRMA) | 10 |
| New Zealand (Recorded Music NZ) | 27 |
| Scotland Singles (OCC) | 14 |
| Switzerland (Schweizer Hitparade) | 58 |
| UK Singles (OCC) | 21 |
| US Billboard Hot 100 | 12 |
| US Adult Contemporary (Billboard) | 19 |
| US Adult Pop Airplay (Billboard) | 3 |
| US Dance Club Songs (Billboard) Remixes | 5 |
| US Dance/Mix Show Airplay (Billboard) | 2 |
| US Pop Airplay (Billboard) | 5 |

| Chart (2012) | Peak position |
|---|---|
| South Korea (Gaon International Singles) | 5 |

=== Year-end charts ===
| Chart (2006) | Position |
|---|---|
| US Billboard Hot 100 | 45 |
| US Adult Contemporary (Billboard) | 37 |
| US Adult Top 40 (Billboard) | 9 |

== Certifications ==
| Region | Certification | Certified units/sales |
|---|---|---|
| Canada (Music Canada) | Gold | 10,000^{*} |
| United States (RIAA) | Gold | 1,306,000 |
^{*} Sales figures based on certification alone.

== Release history ==
| Region | Date | Format | Label(s) | Ref. |
|---|---|---|---|---|
| United States | January 17, 2006 | Contemporary hit radio | RCA | |
| United Kingdom | March 13, 2006 | CD single | RCA; Sony BMG | |
| Australia | March 18, 2006 | Maxi single | RCA; Sony BMG | |
| Germany | November 24, 2006 | CD single | RCA; Sony BMG | |
| Germany | November 24, 2006 | Maxi single | RCA; Sony BMG | |
