= List of Kelly Clarkson concert tours =

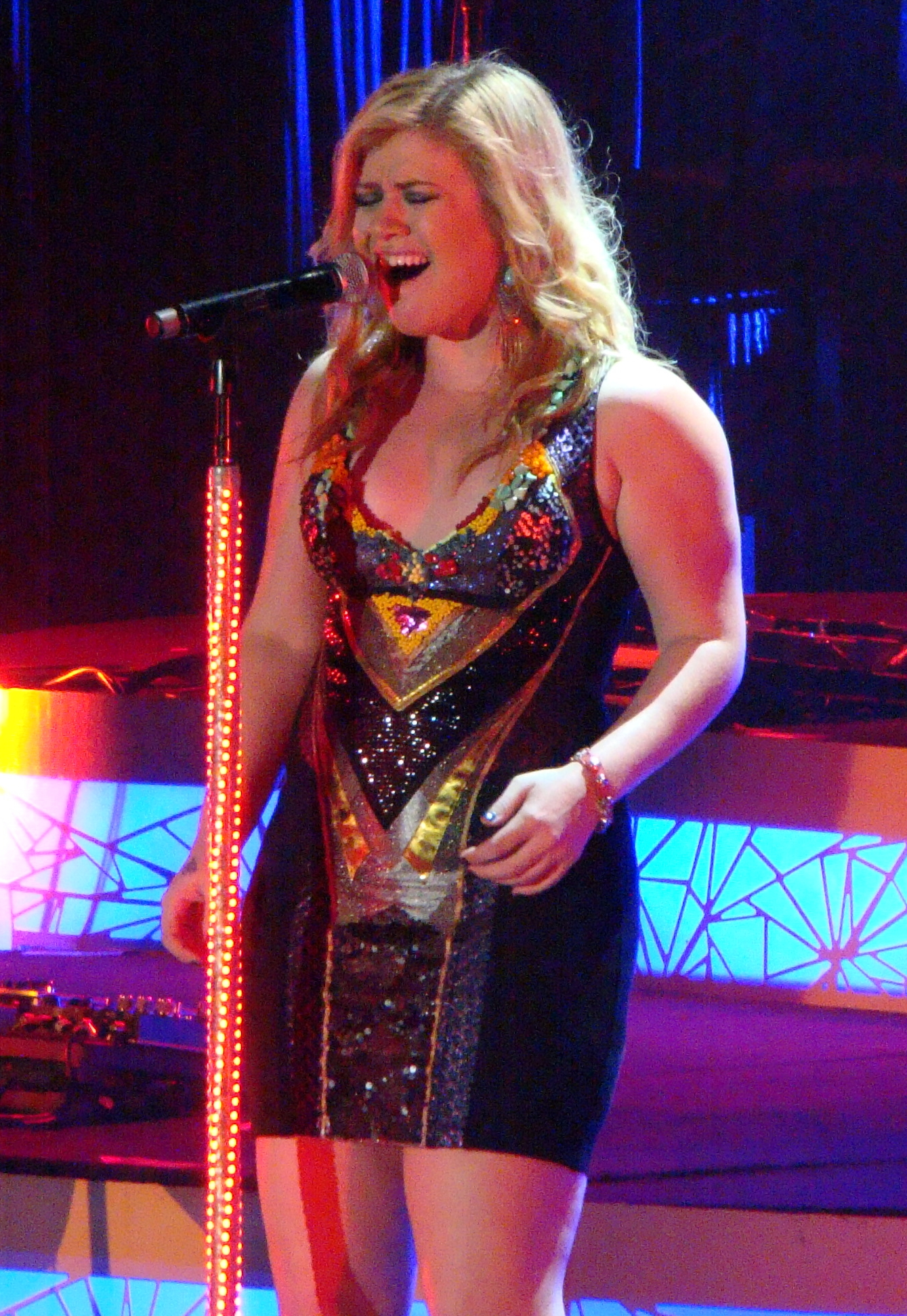
Clarkson performing in 2012

The following is a comprehensive list of American pop singer Kelly Clarkson's concert tours. Clarkson has embarked on eight headlining concerts tours, and five co-headlining concerts tours since 2002. Her first tour was the American Idols Live! Tour 2002 following the first season of American Idol. The Meaning of Life Tour was her eighth and most recent headlining tour (fourteenth overall). Apart from her headlining tours, Clarkson has also been on two promotional tours, and headlined two Las Vegas residencies.

== Concert tours ==
- American Idols Live! Tour (2002)
- Independent Tour (2004)
- Breakaway World Tour (2005-06)
- Behind These Hazel Eyes Tour (2005)
- Addicted Tour (2006)
- My December Tour (2007-08)
- 2 Worlds 2 Voices Tour (2008)
- All I Ever Wanted Tour (2009-10)
- Stronger Tour (2012)

=== Summer Tour (2012) ===
Summer Tour 2012
- Tour by Kelly Clarkson; The Fray
- Associated album: Stronger; Scars & Stories
- Start date: July 21, 2012
- End date: September 15, 2012
- Legs: 1
- No. of shows: 30 in North America

Kelly Clarkson The Fray concert chronology
- Stronger Tour (2012); 2012 Summer Tour (2012); Stronger Tour (2012)

This was a co-headlining concert tour by Clarkson and American alternative rock band The Fray. It supported Clarkson's fifth studio album, Stronger (2011), and The Fray's third studio album, Scars & Stories (2012). Beginning in July 2012, the tour predominately visited the United States and Canada for thirty shows. Most of the shows on the tour were held in outdoor amphitheatres.

=== Tour dates ===
Date	City	Country	Venue
July 21, 2012	Ridgefield	United States	Sleep Country Amphitheater
July 22, 2012	Airway Heights	United States	Northern Quest Resort & Casino
July 25, 2012	Concord	United States	Sleep Train Pavilion
July 27, 2012	Las Vegas	United States	The Chelsea Ballroom
July 28, 2012	Murphy	United States	Ironstone Vineyards
July 30, 2012	Los Angeles	United States	Hollywood Bowl
August 1, 2012	Phoenix	United States	US Airways Arena
August 2, 2012	Albuquerque	United States	Hard Rock Casino
August 4, 2012	Thackerville	United States	WinStar World Casino
August 6, 2012	Orange Beach	United States	Amphitheater at the Wharf
August 8, 2012	Alpharetta	United States	Verizon Wirless Amphitheatre
August 10, 2012	Clarkston	United States	DTE Energy Music Theatre
August 14, 2012	Cincinnati	United States	Riverbend Music Center
August 16, 2012	Camden	United States	Susquehanna Bank Center
August 17, 2012	Hershey	United States	Hersheypark Stadium
August 19, 2012	Bethel	United States	Bethel Woods Center for the Arts
August 21, 2012	Wantagh	United States	Nikon at Jones Beach Theatrer
August 23, 2012	Bristow	United States	Jiffy Lube Live
August 25, 2012	Mansfield	United States	Comcast Center
August 26, 2012	Holmdel Township	United States	PNC Bank Arts Center
August 28, 2012	Toronto	Canada	Monson Canadian Amphitheatre
August 29, 2012	Hopewell	United States	CMAC
September 1, 2012	Tinley Park	United States	Midwest Bank Amphitheatre
September 2, 2012	Noblesville	United States	Klipsch Music Center
September 5, 2012	Independence	United States	Independence Events Center
September 7, 2012	The Woodlands	United States	Cynthia Woods Mitchell Pavilion
September 11, 2012	Virginia Beach	United States	Farm Bureau Live
September 12, 2012	Charlotte	United States	Verizon Wireless Amphitheatre
September 14, 2012	Tuscaloosa	United States	Tuscaloosa Amphitheater
September 15, 2012	Nashville	United States	Bridgestone Arena

- 12th Annual Honda Civic Tour (2013)
- Piece by Piece Tour (2015)
- Meaning of Life Tour (2019)

== Concert residencies ==
=== Chemistry: An Intimate Evening with Kelly Clarkson (2023–24) ===
From July 19 to August 28, 2023, Clarkson headlined her first Las Vegas residency, Chemistry: An Intimate Evening with Kelly Clarkson at the Bakkt Theater in Las Vegas. This comes after her having to cancel her planned 2020 Las Vegas residency due to the COVID-19 pandemic. She added four new shows for December 30–31, 2023, and February 9–10, 2024.

=== Kelly Clarkson: Studio Sessions (2025–26) ===
From July 4 to August 2, and November 7–15, 2025, Clarkson headlined her second Las Vegas residency, Kelly Clarkson: Studio Sessions at The Colosseum at Caesars Palace in Las Vegas. The residency has been extended into 2026.

== See also ==
- List of Kelly Clarkson promotional tours
