= Breakaway (Kelly Clarkson album) =

- Standard artwork by Tony Duran.

Studio album by Kelly Clarkson
- Released: November 30, 2004
- Recorded: April – September 2004
- Studios: Henson, NRG, Westlake (Los Angeles, California); Whitecoat Sound (Malibu, California); Blue Iron Gate (Santa Monica, California); Dr. Luke's Studio (New York City); Maratone (Stockholm, Sweden)
- Genre: Pop rock
- Length: 44:47
- Labels: RCA; 19; S
- Producers: Kara DioGuardi; Dr. Luke; David Hodges; Chantal Kreviazuk; Rhett Lawrence; Raine Maida; Clif Magness; Max Martin; Ben Moody; John Shanks

Kelly Clarkson chronology
Thankful (2003)	Breakaway (2004)	My December (2007)

Alternative cover
- Special edition artwork by James White, also used for the standard release of many regions outside of North America.

Singles from Breakaway
- 1. "Since U Been Gone" Released: November 16, 2004; 2. "Behind These Hazel Eyes" Released: April 12, 2005; 3. "Because of You" Released: August 16, 2005; 4. "Walk Away" Released: January 17, 2006; 5. "Breakaway" Released: June 16, 2006

Breakaway is the second studio album by American singer Kelly Clarkson, released on November 30, 2004, in Canada and in the United States, by RCA Records, with a wider release following throughout 2005. Despite the commercial success of Clarkson's debut album Thankful (2003), music critics still continued to typecast her as an American Idol winner and were also critical of her attempts of establishing a commercial appeal on her own. Wanting to stray from those, she collaborated with a range of new songwriters and producers such as Dr. Luke, Max Martin, John Shanks, Kara DioGuardi, and with former Evanescence members Ben Moody and David Hodges. This overhaul also led her to part ways with her manager Simon Fuller and hire the management services of Jeff Kwatinetz before the album's release.

A sonic departure from the R&B-oriented Thankful, Breakaway is primarily a pop rock record with rock and soul elements, whose lyrics explore themes of heartbreak, love, and escapism. It received a positive response from music critics, with many commending the album's new-found pop rock sound and Clarkson's vocal performances. It won the Grammy Award for Best Pop Vocal Album at the 48th Annual Grammy Awards, garnering many other nominations and awards.

Breakway became a commercial success worldwide; with estimated sales of 12 million copies worldwide, it is one of the best-selling albums of the 21st century. It topped the charts of Ireland and Netherlands and reached the top ten in a number of countries, being the seventh best-selling album of 2005. In the United States, it debuted and peaked at number three on the Billboard 200, staying on the top twenty of the chart for over a year due to the continued success of its singles. It eventually was certified 6× multi-platinum by the Recording Industry Association of America (RIAA) for shipments of more than six million copies.

Breakaway's singles "Since U Been Gone", "Behind These Hazel Eyes", "Because of You", "Walk Away", and "Breakaway" became worldwide hits and have become some of Clarkson's signature songs. Their successes prompted Billboard to credit her for landscaping the core sound of mainstream pop music as an uptempo dance-oriented sound in the 2000s. Furthermore, Breakaway established Clarkson as one of the four highest-selling acts of Sony BMG in the 2000s. To promote the album, Clarkson embarked on three international concert tours from 2005 to 2006: the Breakaway Tour, Hazel Eyes Tour, and the Addicted Tour. Billboard placed the album 77th in the Greatest of All Time Billboard 200 Albums.

== Background and production ==
In early 2004, Clarkson began working on new material for her second studio album, which followed her successful debut album Thankful (2003), while co-headlining the Independent Tour with Clay Aiken, the runner-up from the second season of American Idol. She had also expressed intentions to record with Fantasia Barrino, who had then just won the series' third season; both were expected to release their albums in the same month.

As she began to work for the album with music executive Clive Davis, Clarkson was invited by Whitney Houston to record the song "Breakaway", which would be included for the soundtrack of the 2004 Walt Disney Pictures feature film The Princess Diaries 2: Royal Engagement, which Houston had co-produced. The song, written by Matthew Gerrard, Bridget Benenate, and Avril Lavigne, was initially written for Lavigne's debut album Let Go (2002) but deemed unsuitable for the album's themes at the time. Initially reluctant, Clarkson agreed to record the song. "Breakaway" was first released in July 2004 by Walt Disney Records as a single from the soundtrack, acting as an interim record until her second album's lead single was released. After debuting on the Billboard Hot 100 chart at number 60, it peaked at number six, a week before the album's release.

In April 2004, Clarkson entered the studio immediately after the Independent Tour. She said in an interview, "I've written most of (the songs) so far, but there's some people who have some stuff for me. I'm not one of those people who thinks you have to write everything. (I'll sing it) as long as I can relate to it." During the album's development, Davis revealed that he was reluctant to let Clarkson write material for the album. He mentioned "I always encourage people to write their own songs, but in the pop arena, where the career is totally dependent on hits, you get skeptical. Artists with great voices like Melissa Manchester and Taylor Dayne could have had much longer careers if they didn't insist on writing their own material."

Clarkson reiterated that she had been writing songs since her teens, but rather than argue over labels or abilities, the two reached a détente—she would co-write half the album, with the other half being penned by other songwriters and producers. She said, "I just think it's funny that all these middle-age guys told me, 'You don't know how a pop song needs to sound.' I'm a 23-year-old girl! But I was fighting those battles alone." In February 2004, Clarkson met with musicians Ben Moody and David Hodges, who had just departed from their band Evanescence in late 2003. She said, "I didn't know that he (Moody) wasn't with Evanescence anymore," Clarkson said. "I just really liked their vibe and I thought it might be cool to work with one of them. So I just randomly asked people I work with, 'Hey, do you think that he'd work with me?' And then I found out that he kind of split and that's what he's doing ... so it worked out perfectly." Moody recalled, "It's cool because she wants to do some branching out, and I'm doing nothing but branching out, we got together and she had all these songs in mind of what she wanted to do. It's just a really, really cool process for me, because everybody is a new experience. Everybody works differently."

Worried of Clarkson being continually typecast as a talent show winner, Davis met with various producers, primarily Max Martin, and encouraged them to produce records for Clarkson in a pop rock direction. Clarkson revealed that she expected that she'll always be labeled as an American Idol winner; she remarked, "I'm the first one, so it's going to be on my grave, I'm aware of that. (There's no getting away from it) so why even try?" Upon their meeting, Martin presented songs he wrote with Dr. Luke. These songs include "Since U Been Gone" and a demo version of what would have been "Behind These Hazel Eyes". Davis wanted Clarkson to record the songs, describing them having "a sharp rock edge but were still capable of being pop hits. They would push Kelly in a promising direction for her, while maintaining and even growing her audience." Martin insisted that the songs should be given to rock acts, wanting to stray from his reputation for producing pop singles for the Backstreet Boys and Britney Spears in the 1990s. Davis recalled, "Max was looking to move on from what he had done with Backstreet Boys, and I really spent time convincing them that an American Idol winner could bring all the feeling and passion that was required to the song."

Martin and Dr. Luke eventually agreed and invited Clarkson to travel to Sweden to record the songs. Upon hearing the tracks, Clarkson was skeptical of the pop elements. The three eventually decided to develop a rock sound, a move Clarkson claimed Davis did not approve. Davis reiterated that he was ecstatic with the prospect, claiming that she disliked it and demanded that both the songs be removed from the album. Clarkson then asserted that she wanted it to be on the record and claimed that Davis had detested "Because of You" instead, saying that she "was a shitty writer (sic) who should be grateful for the gifts that he bestows upon her". Davis reiterated that he loved the song and felt that Clarkson could indeed write hits.

== Music and lyrics ==
"I grew up with Aerosmith, and I love listening to Jimi Hendrix. I grew up with a lot of rock influences in my life, but as well as a lot of Aretha Franklin, a lot of soul, so I don't know. I don't wanna limit myself, so I'm gonna kind of do whatever I want and put it on the record."

— Clarkson on Breakaway's musical influences.

Wanting to stray away from the R&B-styled music of Thankful, which she described as a showcase of versatility, she revealed that Thankful's success "empowered me to step more into rock, step more into the soulful vibe." She described the music of the second album as "like the first CD in the sense that it's versatile, but it's more into the rock, It's more into the soulful roots, and it's just a little bit deeper, so it's pretty cool." Dr. Luke revealed in an interview that alternative music and indie music were inspirations to "Since U Been Gone", saying, "That was a conscious move by Max [Martin] and myself, because we were listening to alternative and indie music and talking about some song-I don't remember what it was. I said, 'Ah, I love this song,' and Max was like, 'If they would just write a damn pop chorus on it!' It was driving him nuts, because that indie song was sort of on six, going to seven, going to eight, the chorus comes ... and it goes back down to five. It drove him crazy. And when he said that, it was like, light bulb. 'Why don't we do that, but put a big chorus on it?' It worked." Songs such as "Behind These Hazel Eyes", and "Because of You" were also inspired by her real life experiences, the former about her relationship with an ex-boyfriend and the latter about her experience after her parents' divorce.

Clarkson shares writing credits on six songs from Breakaway. "Breakaway" was included as the album's opening and title track. She described it as a simple song, and further explained, "I think that its simplicity is what's beautiful about it. Whenever writers or producers come to work with me, they take advantage of the fact that I can really belt it out. What's cool about 'Breakaway' is that it doesn't take advantage of that. The song just uses the simplicity of my voice. I've done country music, I've done pop, I've done gospel... all of my singles have sounded different. But this song was different from everything I've done; people didn't even know it was me!" Written by Max Martin and Dr. Luke, Clarkson described the second track "Since U Been Gone", as "not as "smooth" as pop or R&B. Clarkson said of the track, the last to be recorded for the album, "It's very emotional. Vocally, it can be a lot more challenging, but is very fun to play live." Written by Clarkson, Dr. Luke, and Martin, the third track, "Behind These Hazel Eyes", was the last song she had co-written for the album. She recalled, "I wrote 'Behind These Hazel Eyes' about my last boyfriend. It's the last song I wrote for the album, I almost didn't make the deadline." The fourth track, "Because of You", was originally intended for Thankful. Clarkson wrote a draft of the song after a late night talk with a friend who had hard time with her family, with Moody and Hodges providing additional writing. "Gone", the fifth track, was written by Kara DioGuardi and John Shanks. Clarkson admits she cannot relate thoroughly to the song, but felt that it should be heard nonetheless. The sixth track, "Addicted", was written by Clarkson, Ben Moody, and David Hodges. Clarkson revealed that the song was inspired by the songs featured on Evanescence's debut album Fallen (2003). She remarked, "I wanted to work with someone as passionate about music as I am. And then I heard that Evanescence record ... I loved their record because of the passion behind it.

Clarkson co-wrote the seventh track, "Where Is Your Heart", with DioGuardi and Chantal Kreviazuk. She revealed that it was also about her boyfriend, Hodges, whom she described as "wanting to get really into our relationship, and I just thought, 'Where are you in our relationship?'" "Walk Away", the eight track, was also written by the three, with additional writing by Raine Maida. Clarkson described it as "one of the brighter songs" on Breakaway, and said that "It's very blunt and to the point. 'I'm done with you, you're upsetting me.'" DioGuardi and Shanks co-wrote the ninth track, "You Found Me". Clarkson revealed, "When I recorded this one, I was actually in a good place with a guy. It was very fitting at the time that I recorded it." DioGuardi had also co-written the tenth track, "I Hate Myself for Losing You", with Jimmy Harry and Shep Solomon. Clarkson described the song as "depressing", but felt it could be used as a foreshadowing device. She explained "I read something that Sting said in an interview, he talked about how the great thing about writing is that it is an emotional and therapeutic thing and you can get it out." The eleventh track, "Hear Me", was written by Clarkson, DioGuardi, and Clif Magness. Clarkson explained the song, "The song is almost like a prayer to God. I haven't met the person whom I will spend the rest of my life with, but the song is a prayer to God about that. That's what the song is. 'God, I'm ready for 'the one!'" The twelfth and closing track is a live recording of "Beautiful Disaster", originally from Thankful. Clarkson admitted that she hated Thankful's version of the song, and thought the production was distracting from the lyrics. So she decided to record a piano ballad version instead.

== Release and promotion ==
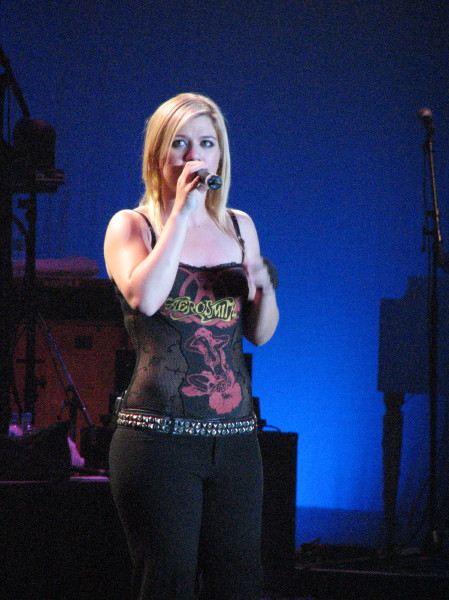
Clarkson performing at the Breakaway Tour in Canberra, Australia in 2005

Breakaway was first released in North America on November 30, 2004, by RCA Records, 19 Recordings, and S Records, following an influx of releases by American Idol contestants Clay Aiken, Ruben Studdard, and Fantasia Barrino. The New York Times columnist Jeff Leeds noted that the releases could benefit from the holiday season, but "it could also hinder their efforts to establish themselves as recording artists with distinctive personalities and the legitimacy needed for long careers." Clive Davis reiterated that the release was intended to recede from their ties from American Idol, saying, "I'm not interested in merely souvenir sales". Clarkson initially intended to name the album Behind These Hazel Eyes as she considered the song one of her favorites on the album, but the album was instead titled Breakaway to capitalize on the success of The Princess Diaries 2: Royal Engagement soundtrack single "Breakaway", which was also reissued as the album's final single. Immediately before the album was released, Clarkson left 19 Management, dismissed Fuller as her manager, and quickly hired the managing services of Jeff Kwatinetz of The Firm, though still contracted to 19 Recordings.

A promotion plan was created for Clarkson for Breakaway's release. Davis positioned her to be RCA's top global priority, and at the recommendation of The Firm, removed American Idol from her official biography. Rather than being booked on arenas for her tour, Kwatinetz booked Clarkson for smaller amphitheaters to hone her performance skills. He remarked, "American Idol gave her a lot of exposure that allowed her to skip some steps in her development, and that's hazardous." Breakaway was first released internationally on January 3, 2005, by the Bertelsmann Music Group (now Sony Music Entertainment), and was released in the United Kingdom on July 18, 2005, by RCA. In November 2005, a special edition CD+DVD was released, containing additional bonus tracks and music videos.

Clarkson, along with Studdard and Barrino, hosted a television musical special on the Fox Broadcasting Company entitled Kelly, Ruben & Fantasia: Home for Christmas on November 25, 2004. On the eve of Breakaway's release, she performed "Since U Been Gone" on The Tonight Show with Jay Leno. In February 2005, she appeared on Saturday Night Live to perform "Since U Been Gone" and "Breakaway". In September 2005, she appeared on The Oprah Winfrey Show and performed "Breakaway" as well as "Because of You". Clarkson also performed in award ceremonies and events; she performed "Since U Been Gone" on the 2005 MTV Video Music Awards at the American Airlines Arena and on the Brit Awards 2006 at the Earls Court. She performed "Because of You" on the 48th Annual Grammy Awards at the Staples Center and on the 15th Echo Awards at the Estrel Hotel.

From 2005 to 2006, Clarkson embarked on three concert tours to promote Breakaway: the Breakaway Tour, Hazel Eyes Tour, and the Addicted Tour. The Breakaway Tour, which took place before, in between and after the Hazel Eyes Tour, marked Clarkson's first world tour, visiting theaters and arenas throughout North America, Europe and Oceania. The Hazel Eyes tour took place in various theaters throughout North America, with the concert at UCF Arena being streamed live on AOL and AOL Radio. Upon returning to the United States, she then embarked on the Addicted Tour, performing at various amphitheaters across the United States.

== Singles ==
Breakaway's lead single, "Since U Been Gone", was released in November 2004, but gained traction at the beginning of 2005. After debuting at number seventy, it peaked on the Billboard Hot 100 at number two, and stayed in the chart's top ten for 20 weeks. Despite a number two peak, "Since U Been Gone" remains as Clarkson's most successful single on the Billboard Hot 100, outpacing even her number one hits on the chart. It also topped nine other Billboard charts, including the Billboard Mainstream Top 40 and the Billboard Dance/Mix Show Airplay, and became a successful hit around the world. The second single, "Behind These Hazel Eyes", was released in April 2005 and continued the chart success. After debuting at number 87 on the Billboard Hot 100, it peaked at number six while "Since U Been Gone" was still in the top ten. It stayed on the chart's top ten for 15 weeks, and also became an international hit.

The third single, "Because of You", released in August 2005, performed successfully along with its predecessors, peaking at number seven on the Billboard Hot 100. While "Since U Been Gone" became Breakaway's most successful release in the United States, "Because of You" became the album's most successful release internationally. It topped the Dutch Top 40 chart in the Netherlands, the Schweizer Hitparade chart in Switzerland, the Tracklisten Airplay chart in Denmark and became a number one single on the Billboard European Hot 100 Singles chart; while also attaining a top ten position in nine regions. The follow-up track, "Walk Away", was released in January 2006 as Breakaway's fourth single and its final release in the United States. After debuting at number 97, it peaked at number 12 on the Billboard Hot 100, and became a top forty hit internationally. Originally released as a single from The Princess Diaries 2: Royal Engagement soundtrack in July 2004, the title track "Breakaway" was reissued as the album's fifth and final single in May 2006. After peaking on the Billboard Hot 100 at number six, it became a top twenty hit internationally.

== Critical reception ==
Professional ratings
Review scores
Source	Rating
AllMusic	4/5 stars
Christgau’s Consumer Guide	B−
Entertainment Weekly	B
DIY	4.5/5 stars
The Guardian	2/5 stars
Pitchfork	7.6/10
Rolling Stone	3/5 stars
Slant Magazine	3.5/5 stars
Sputnikmusic	4.0/5
Stylus	B

The album received positive reviews from music critics. AllMusic senior editor Stephen Thomas Erlewine, who gave it four out of five stars, wrote "what gives Breakaway its spine are the driving, anthemic pop tunes, numbers that sound simultaneously mainstream and youthful, which is a hard trick to pull off" and describing the tracks as the ones that illustrate Clarkson as a rare thing in the 2000s: "a pop singer who's neither hip nor square, just solidly and enjoyably in the mainstream." Sputnikmusic's Dave Donnelly gave it a "4" rating, remarking that "Breakaway is not a Thriller to her Off The Wall by no means, but she has at least created a rare type of album: a one that offers a full selection of potential singles, reminiscent of Michael Jackson's Bad or Thriller, which he described as having a mass appeal with artistic integrity and perceived longevity. Breakaway may be remembered in years to come as a pop classic, alongside Madonna's early material perhaps."

Raymond Fiore of Entertainment Weekly gave the album a "B" rating, noting its rock direction and describing it as "Avril-meets-Evanescence, with a splash of Pat Benatar." Sal Cinquemani of Slant Magazine gave Breakaway a three-and-a-half star rating and commented that "though her rocky leanings were hinted at on the less coherent Thankful Charles Merwin wrote for Stylus Magazine that the album's probable non-singles still maintain a quality "high enough to quell worries about the "I love the singles, but that's all I really need to hear" arguments." He described Clarkson as ranking somewhere at the top of her class as far as rock albums go among the teen pop set, saying that she "has a long way to go before we'll ever feel comfortable calling her anything besides an American Idol, but for now she has a sound that seems believable enough to support her considerable chops." In a quick review, Billboard described Breakaway as a "rare exhibition of substance over style".

Some critics, however, were less impressed by the album. Shirley Halperin of Rolling Stone offered a mixed review by giving the album a three-star rating and saying "Clarkson isn't ready for her new sound." She asked, "You can't help but wonder, Who is the real Kelly Clarkson, and when will she stop wearing her big sister's hand-me-downs?" Caroline Sullivan of The Guardian gave it a two-star rating, saying that "the title track expresses Clarkson's novel desire to "spread my wings and learn to fly", but settles into a catchy enough rut at times."

== Accolades ==
Breakaway received various accolades from several music industry awards. It won Grammy Awards for Best Pop Vocal Album and Best Female Pop Vocal Performance for "Since U Been Gone" at the 48th ceremony, making Clarkson the first alumnus ever from American Idol to win in the awards show. The album was also nominated for a Juno Award for International Album of the Year at the Juno Awards of 2006. In the American Music Awards of 2005, Breakaway received four nominations, including Favorite Pop/Rock Album, and earned Clarkson two awards for Artist of the Year and Favorite Adult Contemporary Artist. In addition, Clarkson won the award for Favorite Pop/Rock Female Artist at the American Music Awards of 2006. The album also won nine out of her twelve nominations at the 2005 Billboard Music Awards. At the 2005 Teen Choice Awards, Breakaway won four awards, including a Choice Album award. At the TMF Awards, the album enabled Clarkson to win three awards, including a Best Pop Artist and a Best Female Artist award.

Breakaway also appeared on decade-end best-of lists. Newsweek ranked it as the ninth best album of the 2000s. Entertainment Weekly ranked it as the 29th of the 100 best albums from 1988 to 2008. Rolling Stone ranked it as the 11th top album in their decade-end reader's poll.

== Commercial performance ==
Breakaway is currently Clarkson's most successful release to date, with sales of over 12 million copies worldwide. On the week ending December 18, 2004, the album debuted at number three on the Billboard 200 album chart in the United States with 250,000 copies sold, which were 47,000 less than her first week sales of Thankful. Music commercial analysts noted that Clarkson's commercial appeal has endured beyond American Idol, but also commented on its slumping performance. Billboard director Geoff Mayfield noted the lackluster performance may have been caused by being released in a competitive holiday market. Despite failing to top the chart, the record stayed on the top twenty of the Billboard 200 for 61 consecutive weeks, and became the first title in five years to spend its entire year in the top twenty of the chart. By the end of 2005, Breakaway became the year's third best-selling album in the United States, according to Nielsen Soundscan. It was certified 6× multi-platinum by the Recording Industry Association of America on May 23, 2007, and as of November 2024, it has sold over 6.4 million copies in the United States, becoming her best-selling record in the region.

Breakaway has also enjoyed commercial success internationally; it became her first album to chart in over nineteen regions. By the end of 2005, the album became the world's seventh best-selling release of the year according to the International Federation of the Phonographic Industry. In the United Kingdom, it debuted on the Official UK Albums Chart at number ten with 17,631 copies. At the beginning of 2006, the album ascended to number three on the chart. As of 2012, it has sold over 1,571,278 copies in the region. In Australia, Breakaway debuted on the ARIA Albums Chart at number twenty-nine, and also spent its entire year on the top fifty, peaking at number two. In Ireland, the album debuted on the IRMA Artist Albums chart at number twenty-one, and topped the chart in 2006. Together with the Australian Recording Industry Association, the Irish Recorded Music Association certified the record as 7× multi-platinum, its highest certification overall. In the Netherlands, the album debuted on the Mega Album Top 100 at number forty-seven and topped the chart for three weeks. Additionally, Breakaway peaked in the top five in the national charts of Austria, Belgium, Denmark, Germany, Greece, New Zealand, Portugal, and Switzerland; and has attained top twenty positions in six additional regions worldwide.

== Impact and legacy ==
According to Billboard, as of 2022, Breakaway is one of the 15 best-performing 21st-century albums without any of its singles being number-one hits on the Billboard Hot 100.

Music commercial analysts reported that Clarkson attained a commercial appeal on her own with Breakaway, despite their initial skepticism of her establishing prominence beyond American Idol. Clive Davis recalled that "with the songs "Since U Been Gone" and "Behind These Hazel Eyes", we were able to take Clarkson to a major seller of albums all over the world where they had never even heard of American Idol." According to Mediabase, which monitors radio station airplay in North America, Clarkson was the most played artist on the radio in 2006. David Corey, program director of WXKS-FM, described the feat as "very rare". Just before the release of her third studio album, Davis also stated that she was one of the top four artists at Sony BMG. According to Seattle Post-Intelligencer, "the turning point for Idol's credibility may have been the success of Clarkson's sophomore album, released in 2004. While her first album, released soon after her win on "Idol," was a platinum success, it only generated two hit singles and her success seemed tied into her newfound fame. But her hard-rocking second disc, which contained smashes like "Since U Been Gone" and the ballad "Because of You", garnered her critical acclaim and made her a bonafide success apart from Idol."

Billboard credits Clarkson for landscaping the core sound of mainstream pop music in the 2000s to an uptempo dance-oriented sound with the release of "Since U Been Gone" and the singles that followed it. The album's producers also came into prominence due to the album's success. Dr. Luke, who was the house band lead guitarist for Saturday Night Live at the time of Breakaway's release, has credited "Since U Been Gone" as his first big break. Max Martin, who had already found major success as a music producer in the 1990s and early 2000s with, among others, Britney Spears, Backstreet Boys and NSYNC, achieved more prominence due to the success of "Since U Been Gone" and "Behind These Hazel Eyes".

Breakaway's critical acclaim also enabled Clarkson to also earn critical respect, particularly from the rock and indie music scene, who had looked down upon American Idol contestants. In his memoir, Davis recalled a meeting with Simon Fuller and Sony BMG President Charles Goldstuck, where Fuller acknowledged how the worldwide success of Breakaway had validated American Idol itself. The popularity of "Since U Been Gone" among the rock community also resulted in various cover versions by rock acts, such as A Day to Remember, Ted Leo, and Tokyo Police Club. Clarkson herself recalled, "It's ridiculous how well that song was received by hard rockers, by indie people. I was walking around with a friend of mine and this hard-rock guy came up to me and was like, 'I look stupid, but I tell my friends I love this song.' People at concerts are like, 'That's my guilty pleasure. I don't mean to be mean, but I didn't want to like the American Idol girl.' But they love that song, and it kind of won them over."

== Track listing ==
Breakaway – Standard edition
No.	Title	Writer(s)	Producer(s)	Length
1.	"Breakaway"	Matthew Gerrard; Bridget Benenate; Avril Lavigne	John Shanks	3:57
2.	"Since U Been Gone"	Max Martin; Lukasz Gottwald	Martin; Dr. Luke	3:08
3.	"Behind These Hazel Eyes"	Kelly Clarkson; Martin; Gottwald	Martin; Dr. Luke	3:19
4.	"Because of You"	Clarkson; David Hodges; Ben Moody	Hodges; Moody	3:39
5.	"Gone"	Kara DioGuardi; Shanks	Shanks	3:25
6.	"Addicted"	Clarkson; Hodges; Moody	Hodges; Moody	3:57
7.	"Where Is Your Heart"	Clarkson; DioGuardi; Chantal Kreviazuk	Raine Maida; Kreviazuk	4:39
8.	"Walk Away"	Clarkson; DioGuardi; Kreviazuk; Maida	DioGuardi; Kreviazuk; Maida	3:09
9.	"You Found Me"	DioGuardi; Shanks	Shanks	3:40
10.	"I Hate Myself for Losing You"	DioGuardi; Jimmy Harry; Shep Solomon	Clif Magness	3:20
11.	"Hear Me"	Clarkson; DioGuardi; Magness	Magness	3:53
12.	"Beautiful Disaster" (Live)	Matthew Wilder; Rebekah Jordan		4:37
Total length:				44:47

Breakaway – International bonus edition (bonus tracks)
No.	Title	Writer(s)	Producer	Length
13.	"Miss Independent"	Clarkson; Rhett Lawrence; Christina Aguilera; Matt Morris	Lawrence	3:34
14.	"Low"	Jimmy Harry	Magness	3:29
Total length:				51:50

Breakaway – Japanese limited edition (bonus tracks)
No.	Title	Writer(s)	Length
13.	"Miss Independent" (AOL live version)	Clarkson; Lawrence; Aguilera; Morris	3:41
14.	"Since U Been Gone" (AOL live version)	Martin; Gottwald	3:16
Total length:			51:44

Breakaway – Special edition (bonus tracks)
No.	Title	Writer(s)	Length
13.	"Since U Been Gone" (Jason Nevins Club Mix)	Martin; Gottwald	7:40
14.	"Behind These Hazel Eyes" (Joe Bermudez & Josh Harris Top 40 Radio Mix)	Clarkson; Martin; Gottwald	3:10
15.	"Breakaway" (NapsterLive version)	Gerrard; Benenate; Lavigne	4:21
16.	"Because of You" (Rolling Stone live session)	Clarkson; Hodges; Moody	3:34
17.	"Miss Independent" (AOL live version)	Clarkson; Lawrence; Aguilera; Morris	3:41
18.	"Hear Me" (AOL live version)	Clarkson; DioGuardi; Magness	3:56
Total length:			71:09

Breakaway – Japanese special edition (bonus tracks)
No.	Title	Writer(s)	Length
13.	"Since U Been Gone" (Jason Nevins Club Mix)	Martin; Gottwald	7:40
14.	"Behind These Hazel Eyes" (Joe Bermudez & Josh Harris Top 40 Radio Mix)	Clarkson; Martin; Gottwald	3:10
15.	"Breakaway" (NapsterLive version)	Gerrard; Benenate; Lavigne	4:21
16.	"Because of You" (Rolling Stone live session)	Clarkson; Hodges; Moody	3:34
17.	"Since U Been Gone" (AOL live version)	Martin; Gottwald	3:16
18.	"Miss Independent" (AOL live version)	Clarkson; Lawrence; Aguilera; Morris	3:41
19.	"Hear Me" (AOL live version)	Clarkson; DioGuardi; Magness	3:56
Total length:			71:09

Breakaway – Japanese Special edition DVD
No.	Title	Director(s)	Length
1.	"Since U Been Gone" (Music video)	Alex DeRakoff	3:08
2.	"Behind These Hazel Eyes" (Music video)	Joseph Kahn	3:18
3.	"Because of You" (Music video)	Vadim Perelman	3:39
Total length:			10:05

== Personnel ==
Vocals

- Kelly Clarkson – all vocals

Musicians

- Kenny Aronoff – drums (9)
- Paul Bushnell – bass (5)
- David Campbell – string arrangements (4, 6)
- Mark Colbert – drums (4, 6)
- Randy Cooke – drums (7, 8)
- Olle Dahlstedt – drums (2)
- Josh Freese – drums (10, 11)
- Lukasz Gottwald – all instruments (2, 3)
- Jason Halbert – acoustic piano (12), arrangements (12)
- David Hodges – acoustic piano (4, 6), string arrangements (4, 6), programming (6)
- Chantal Kreviazuk – string arrangements (7, 8)
- Jason Lader – programming (7, 8), bass (7, 8)
- Victor Lawrence – cello (7, 8)
- Clif Magness – keyboards (10, 11), programming (10, 11), acoustic guitar (10, 11), electric guitars (10, 11), bass (10, 11), acoustic piano (11)
- Raine Maida – guitars (7, 8), string arrangements (7, 8)
- Max Martin – all instruments (2, 3)
- Ben Moody – guitars (4, 6)
- Marty O'Brien – bass (4, 6)
- Shanti Randall – viola (7, 8)
- Mark Robertson – violin (7, 8)
- Shawn Pelton – drums (3)
- Jeff Rothschild – drums (1, 5)
- John Shanks – keyboards (1, 5, 9), guitars (1, 5, 9), bass (1, 5, 9)
- Phil X – guitars (7, 8)
- Shalini Vijayan – violin (7, 8)

Production

- Jon Berkowitz – assistant engineer (7, 8)
- Johan "Brorsan" Brorsson – Pro Tools technician (2, 3), instrument recording assistant (3)
- Dan Certa – recording (4, 6)
- Sergio Chavez – recording assistant (4, 6)
- Clive Davis – album producer
- Tony Duran – photography
- Toby Francis – live engineer (12)
- Lars Fox – additional engineer (5, 9)
- Simon Fuller and 19 Entertainment – management
- Brian Garcia – recording (7, 8)
- Şerban Ghenea – mixing (2, 3, 4, 6–11)
- Brad Gilderman – mixing (12)
- Lukasz Gottwald – recording (2, 3)
- Kevin Guarnieri – recording (3)
- John Hanes – additional Pro Tools engineer (2–11)
- Robin C. Hendrickson – art direction
- Mark Kiczula – assistant engineer (7, 8, 10, 11)
- Brett Kilroe – art direction
- Aaron Lepley – assistant engineer (12)
- Clif Magness – engineer (10, 11)
- Raine Maida – recording (7, 8)
- Lasse Mårtén – recording (2, 3), instrument recording (2, 3)
- Max Martin – recording (2, 3)
- Renson Mateo – assistant engineer (12)
- Glenn Pittman – recording assistant (5, 9)
- Tim Roberts – instrument recording assistant (2, 3), mix assistant (2, 3, 4, 6–11)
- Jason Rankins – instrument recording assistant (3)
- Jeff Rothschild – recording (1, 5, 9), mixing (1, 5)
- John Shanks – mixing (1, 5)
- Shari Sutcliffe – music contractor (1, 5, 9), production coordinator (1, 5, 9)
- Mark Valentine – additional engineer (5, 9)
- Cameron Webb – recording (7, 8), string recording (7, 8), digital editing (10, 11)
- Joe Yannece – mastering

Studios

- Recorded at Henson Recording Studios (Hollywood, California); NRG Studios (North Hollywood, California); Westlake Audio (Los Angeles, California); Whitecoat Sound (Malibu, California); Blue Iron Gate Studios (Santa Monica, California); Dr. Luke's (New York City, New York); Maratone Studios and Decibel Studios (Stockholm, Sweden).
- Mixed at Henson Recording Studios; The Little Big Room (Burbank, California); MixStar Studios (Virginia Beach, Virginia).
- Mastered at Hit Factory Mastering (New York City, New York).

== Charts ==
=== Weekly charts ===
2004–2006 weekly chart performance for Breakaway
Chart	Peak position
Australian Albums (ARIA)	2
Austrian Albums (Ö3 Austria)	3
Belgian Albums (Ultratop Flanders)	3
Belgian Albums (Ultratop Wallonia)	31
Canadian Albums (Billboard)	6
Czech Albums (ČNS IFPI)	27
Danish Albums (Hitlisten)	2
Dutch Albums (Album Top 100)	1
European Top 100 Albums (Billboard)	3
Finnish Albums (Suomen virallinen lista)	6
French Albums (SNEP)	20
German Albums (Offizielle Top 100)	4
Greek Albums (IFPI)	2
Hungarian Albums (MAHASZ)	19
Irish Albums (IRMA)	1
Italian Albums (FIMI)	36
Japanese Albums (Oricon)	40
Japanese Albums (Oricon) Special edition	184
Malaysian International Albums (RIM)	1
Mexican Albums (Top 100 Mexico)	13
New Zealand Albums (RMNZ)	5
Norwegian Albums (VG-lista)	8
Polish Albums (ZPAV)	24
Portuguese Albums (AFP)	4
Scottish Albums (Official Charts)	3
South African Albums (RISA)	1
Spanish Albums (Promusicae)	49
Swedish Albums (Sverigetopplistan)	6
Swiss Albums (Schweizer Hitparade)	2
UK Albums (Official Charts)	3
US Billboard 200	3

2010 weekly chart performance for Breakaway
Chart	Peak position
South Korean International Albums (Circle)	39

=== Year-end charts ===
2005 year-end chart performance for Breakaway
Chart	Position
Australian Albums (ARIA)	2
Belgian Albums (Ultratop Flanders)	83
German Albums (Offizielle Top 100)	97
Irish Albums (IRMA)	6
New Zealand Albums (RMNZ)	9
UK Albums (OCC)	8
US Billboard 200	5
Worldwide Albums (IFPI)	7

2006 year-end chart performance for Breakaway
Chart	Position
Australian Albums (ARIA)	29
Austrian Albums (Ö3 Austria)	22
Belgian Albums (Ultratop Flanders)	10
Belgian Albums (Ultratop Wallonia)	99
Danish Albums (Hitlisten)	13
Dutch Albums (Album Top 100)	10
European Hot 100 Albums (Billboard)	6
Finnish Albums (Suomen virallinen lista)	17
French Albums (SNEP)	132
German Albums (Offizielle Top 100)	10
Greek International Albums (IFPI)	19
Hungarian Albums (MAHASZ)	67
Irish Albums (IRMA)	11
Mexican Albums (Top 100 Mexico)	33
Swedish Albums (Sverigetopplistan)	39
Swiss Albums (Schweizer Hitparade)	19
UK Albums (OCC)	30
US Billboard 200	10
Worldwide Albums (IFPI)	45

2007 year-end chart performance for Breakaway
Chart	Position
US Top Catalog Albums (Billboard)	18

=== Decade-end charts ===
2000s decade-end chart performance for Breakaway
Chart	Position
Australian Albums (ARIA)	21
UK Albums (OCC)	60
US Billboard 200	29

== Certifications ==
Certifications and sales for Breakaway
Region	Certification	Certified units/sales
Australia (ARIA)	7× Platinum	490,000^{^}
Austria (IFPI Austria)	Gold	15,000^{*}
Belgium (BRMA)	Platinum	50,000^{*}
Brazil (Pro-Música Brasil)	Gold	50,000^{*}
Canada (Music Canada)	5× Platinum	500,000^{^}
Denmark (IFPI Danmark)	3× Platinum	60,000^{‡}
Finland	—	13,646
France (SNEP)	Silver	35,000^{*}
Germany (BVMI)	2× Platinum	400,000^{‡}
Hungary (MAHASZ)	Gold	10,000^{^}
Indonesia	Platinum	
Ireland (IRMA)	7× Platinum	105,000^{^}
Mexico (AMPROFON)	Gold	50,000^{^}
Netherlands (NVPI)	Gold	40,000^{^}
New Zealand (RMNZ)	4× Platinum	60,000^{‡}
Norway (IFPI Norway)	2× Platinum	80,000^{*}
Portugal (AFP)	Gold	10,000^{^}
Singapore (RIAS)	Platinum	15,000^{*}
South Africa (RISA)	2× Platinum	100,000^{*}
Sweden (GLF)	Platinum	60,000^{^}
Switzerland (IFPI Switzerland)	Platinum	40,000^{^}
United Kingdom (BPI)	5× Platinum	1,590,000
United States (RIAA)	6× Platinum	6,400,000
Summaries
Europe (IFPI)	2× Platinum	2,000,000^{*}
^{*} Sales figures based on certification alone.^{^} Shipments figures based on certification alone.^{‡} Sales+streaming figures based on certification alone.

== Release history ==
Release history and formats for Breakaway
Region	Date	Edition(s)	Format(s)	Label(s)	Ref.
Canada	November 30, 2004	Standard	CD	Sony BMG	
United States	November 30, 2004	Standard	CD	RCA; 19; S	
Australia	December 6, 2004	Standard	CD	Sony BMG	
Japan	January 26, 2005	Standard	CD	BMG Japan	
Poland	June 17, 2005	Standard	CD	Sony BMG	
United Kingdom	July 18, 2005	Standard	CD	RCA	
Germany	August 1, 2005	Standard	CD	Sony BMG	
Australia	November 6, 2005	Tour	Double CD	Sony BMG	
Japan	December 21, 2005	Special	CD+DVD	BMG Japan	
France	March 27, 2006	Standard	CD	Sony BMG	
Various	November 22, 2024	20th anniversary	Vinyl	Legacy	

== See also ==
- List of number-one albums of 2006 (Ireland)
- List of best-selling albums by women
- List of best-selling albums of the 2000s in Australia
- List of best-selling albums of the 2000s in the United Kingdom
