= The Breakaway Tour =

2005–06 concert tour by Kelly Clarkson

- Tour by Kelly Clarkson
- Promotional poster for the tour
- Associated album: Breakaway
- Start date: March 30, 2005
- End date: March 23, 2006
- Legs: 3
- No. of shows: 38 in North America; 9 in Australia; 19 in Europe; 66 Total

Kelly Clarkson concert chronology
- Independent Tour (2004); The Breakaway Tour (2005–06); Hazel Eyes Tour (2005)
Hazel Eyes Tour (2005)	The Breakaway Tour (2005–2006)	Addicted Tour (2006)

The Breakaway Tour was the first headlining concert tour by American pop recording artist Kelly Clarkson. It began on March 30, 2005, in Tulsa, Oklahoma and finished on March 23, 2006, in Vienna, Austria. The tour promoted her second studio album, Breakaway (2004), and this was her first tour to visit Australia and Europe. This was the first of three tours to promote Breakaway. Clarkson went on to embark on the Hazel Eyes Tour in North America before and in between the Australian and European legs of this tour.

== Background ==
The North American leg of the tour was announced in February 2005. In September 2005, the Australian leg was announced.

== Opening acts ==
- Graham Colton Band (North America)
- Rogue Traders (Australia)

== Setlist ==
1. "Since U Been Gone"
2. "Walk Away"
3. "Gone"
4. "Low"
5. "Just Missed the Train"
6. "What's Up Lonely"
7. "Thankful"
8. "The Trouble with Love Is"
9. "Don't"
10. "Covers medley: "Piece of My Heart" / "The Thrill Is Gone" / "Sweet Dreams (Are Made of This)"
11. "Beautiful Disaster"
12. "Addicted"
13. "Because of You"
14. "Where is Your Heart"
15. "Behind These Hazel Eyes"

Encore

16. "Miss Independent"
17. "A Moment Like This"
18. "Breakaway"

== Tour dates ==
Date	City	Country	Venue
North America
March 30, 2005	Tulsa	United States	Chapman Music Hall
March 31, 2005	Kansas City	United States	Midland Theatre
April 2, 2005	Omaha	United States	Omaha Civic Auditorium Music Hall
April 5, 2005	Milwaukee	United States	Riverside Theater
April 6, 2005	Minneapolis	United States	State Theatre
April 8, 2005	Indianapolis	United States	Murat Theatre
April 9, 2005	Cleveland	United States	Palace Theatre at Playhouse Square
April 11, 2005	Columbus	United States	Palace Theatre
April 12, 2005	Detroit	United States	State Theatre
April 14, 2005	Rosemont	United States	Rosemont Theatre
April 16, 2005	Toronto	Canada	Massey Hall
April 17, 2005	Kitchener	Canada	Raffi Armenian Theatre
April 19, 2005	London	Canada	John Labatt Centre
April 21, 2005	Montreal	Canada	Salle Wilfrid-Pelletier
April 22, 2005	Boston	United States	Orpheum Theatre
April 24, 2005	Wallingford	United States	CareerBuilder.com Oakdale Theater
April 25, 2005	Newark	United States	Prudential Hall
April 27, 2005	New York City	United States	Hammerstein Ballroom
April 28, 2005	Providence	United States	Providence Performing Arts Center
April 30, 2005	Upper Darby Township	United States	Tower Theatre
May 1, 2005	Washington, D.C.	United States	DAR Constitution Hall
May 3, 2005	Clemson	United States	Littlejohn Coliseum
May 4, 2005	Atlanta	United States	Fox Theatre
May 6, 2005	Boca Raton	United States	Count de Hoernle Amphitheater
May 7, 2005	Clearwater	United States	Ruth Eckerd Hall
May 9, 2005	Houston	United States	Verizon Wireless Theater
May 10, 2005	Grand Prairie	United States	Nokia Live
May 13, 2005^{[A]}	Chula Vista	United States	Coors Amphitheatre
May 14, 2005^{[B]}	Anaheim	United States	Angel Stadium
May 16, 2005	Phoenix	United States	Dodge Theatre
May 18, 2005	Los Angeles	United States	Wiltern Theatre
May 19, 2005	Los Angeles	United States	Wiltern Theatre
May 21, 2005^{[C]}	New York City	United States	Rumsey Playfield
May 22, 2005	East Rutherford	United States	Izod Center
May 24, 2005	San Jose	United States	San Jose Civic Auditorium
May 26, 2005	Seattle	United States	Paramount Theatre
May 28, 2005	Portland	United States	Schnitzer Concert Hall
May 29, 2005	Vancouver	Canada	Queen Elizabeth Theatre
Australia
November 4, 2005	Perth	Australia	Challenge Stadium
November 6, 2005	Adelaide	Australia	Adelaide Entertainment Centre
November 9, 2005	Melbourne	Australia	Rod Laver Arena
November 10, 2005	Geelong	Australia	Geelong Arena
November 12, 2005	Wollongong	Australia	Wollongong Entertainment Centre
November 13, 2005	Sydney	Australia	Sydney Entertainment Centre
November 15, 2005	Canberra	Australia	AIS Arena
November 16, 2005	Brisbane	Australia	Brisbane Entertainment Centre
November 18, 2005	Newcastle	Australia	Newcastle Entertainment Centre
Europe
February 17, 2006	Manchester	England	Carling Apollo Manchester
February 18, 2006	Glasgow	Scotland	Clyde Auditorium
February 20, 2006	Newcastle	England	Metro Radio Arena
February 22, 2006	London	England	Hammersmith Apollo
February 25, 2006	Bournemouth	England	Windsor Hall
February 27, 2006	Birmingham	England	National Indoor Arena
February 28, 2006	Cardiff	Wales	Cardiff International Arena
March 2, 2006	Dublin	Ireland	Point Theatre
March 5, 2006	London	England	Hammersmith Apollo
March 6, 2006	London	England	Hammersmith Apollo
March 7, 2006	Nottingham	England	Nottingham Arena
March 9, 2006	Sheffield	England	Hallam FM Arena
March 10, 2006	Manchester	England	Manchester Evening News Arena
March 12, 2006	Brussels	Belgium	Forest National
March 13, 2006	Amsterdam	Netherlands	Heineken Music Hall
March 18, 2006	Cologne	Germany	Palladium
March 21, 2006	Berlin	Germany	Columbiahalle
March 22, 2006	Munich	Germany	Zenith Kulturhalle
March 23, 2006	Vienna	Austria	Planet.tt Bank Austria Halle

Festivals and other miscellaneous performances
^{A} This concert was a part of Channel 933 FM's Your Show
^{B} This concert was a part of Wango Tango
^{C} This concert was a part of Beauty Live

=== Canceled shows ===
Date	City	Country	Venue	Reason
November 20, 2005	Christchurch	New Zealand	WestpacTrust Centre	Vocal rest due to strained vocal cords.
November 22, 2005	Auckland	New Zealand	Logan Campbell Centre	Vocal rest due to strained vocal cords.
March 19, 2006	Paris	France	Le Grand Rex	Cancelled
March 26, 2006	Tel Aviv	Israel	Hangar 11	Cancelled
March 27, 2006	Tel Aviv	Israel	Hangar 11	Cancelled

== Personnel ==
Band

- Kelly Clarkson – lead vocals
- Al Berry – bass
- Cory Churko – multi-instrumentalist
- Jason Halbert – keyboards, musical director, piano
- Jimmy Messer – guitar
- Danny Weissfeld – guitar
- Derek Wyatt – drums

Other

- Ashley Donavan – hair & makeup
- Tim Krieg – tour manager
- Jeff Kwatinetz & The Firm, Inc. – management
