= Beautiful Disaster (Kelly Clarkson song) =

Song by Kelly Clarkson

from the album Thankful
- Studio: HP Studios (Los Angeles, CA); Capitol Studios (Los Angeles, CA)
- Length: 4:12
- Label: RCA
- Songwriters: Rebekah Jordan; Matthew Wilder
- Producer: Matthew Wilder

"Beautiful Disaster" is a song recorded by American recording artist Kelly Clarkson on her debut studio album Thankful (2003). Matthew Wilder produced the track, and wrote it along with Rebekah Jordan. "Beautiful Disaster" reflects a woman's prayer about a man whom she loves despite his iniquities. A live piano version of the song was included as the twelfth track on Clarkson's second studio album Breakaway (2004).

"Beautiful Disaster" garnered positive reviews from music critics, who complimented the song's musical structure and composition. Eight years after its release, the track entered the Official UK Singles Chart at number 124. Clarkson performed the song on the third season finale of American Idol, and has included it in the set lists for her concert tours.

== Background ==
Matthew Wilder produced "Beautiful Disaster", and wrote it along with Rebekah Jordan. Jordan and Wilder had pitched the song to Clarkson during the recording sessions for her debut album Thankful (2003). Jordan explained that she had written the track about her strained relationship with her boyfriend who was suffering from substance dependence. During a 2004 performance, Clarkson expressed her disappointment with the original song. She felt that Wilder's overproduction took away from the song's original message, and explained that RCA executives had chosen to keep it.

== Reception ==
"Beautiful Disaster" received generally positive reviews from music critics. A writer from the Associated Press noted that the song sounded like "good outtakes from a Debbie Gibson album circa 1987". Dave Ferman of Fort Worth Star-Telegram described the song as "Chugging, '80s-influenced rock, in which Kelly wonders if it's a good idea to go after that handsome bad boy. And the answer is . . . maybe." Eric Danton of The Buffalo News pointed to "Beautiful Disaster" as "one of the (Thankful) disc's best tunes"

Eight years after its release, the track entered the Official UK Singles Chart at number 124.

== Live performances ==
Clarkson performed a piano ballad version of "Beautiful Disaster" on the Independent Tour and in televised performances. Her record label criticized her decision as they felt the song did not "sound 'big' enough", in which she insisted that "the production was distracting from the lyrics". She sang it on the third season finale of American Idol on May 26, 2004, as well as The View and The Early Show on August 16, 2004. The live version of the song garnered a better response, leading to Clarkson including it as the closing track for her second studio album Breakaway (2004).

== Personnel ==
- Kelly Clarkson: Main Vocal
- Rebekah Jordan: Vocal Backing
- Matthew Wilder: Guitars, Keyboards and Piano, Programming
- James Harrah: Guitars
- Mike Elizondo: Bass
- Abe Laboriel Jr.: Drums, Percussion

== Production ==
- Arranged and Produced by Matthew Wilder
- Engineer: Csaba Petocz; Second Engineer: Quentin Dunn
- Mixed by Mike Shipley

== Charts ==
Chart (2011)	Peak position
UK Singles (Official Charts Company)	124
