= Since U Been Gone =

2004 single by Kelly Clarkson

- Original 2004 U.S. release

Single by Kelly Clarkson

from the album Breakaway
- B-side: "Miss Independent" (AOL live version)
- Released: November 16, 2004
- Recorded: 2004
- Studio: Dr. Luke's (New York City); Maratone (Stockholm, Sweden)
- Genre: Pop rock; power pop; bubblegum; pop-punk
- Length: 3:08
- Label: RCA
- Songwriters: Max Martin; Lukasz Gottwald
- Producers: Max Martin; Dr. Luke

Kelly Clarkson singles chronology
| "Breakaway" (2004) | "Since U Been Gone" (2004) | "Behind These Hazel Eyes" (2005) |

Alternative cover
- 2005 international reissue

Music video
- "Since U Been Gone" on YouTube

"Since U Been Gone" is a song recorded by American singer Kelly Clarkson from her second studio album, Breakaway (2004). The song, written and produced by Max Martin and Lukasz "Dr. Luke" Gottwald, was released as the lead single from Breakaway two weeks before the album was released. An uptempo power ballad with alternative rock and indie rock influences, it mixes loud and soft pop rock, power pop, bubblegum, and pop-punk with electronic sounds. Martin originally wrote "Since U Been Gone" with Pink in mind, but she turned it down. It was then given to Hilary Duff, but she rejected the song because she could not reach its higher notes. The song was finally given to Clarkson after Clive Davis convinced the writers to give it to her. Clarkson decided to add heavier guitars and harder drums to the song after noticing that the demo had an obvious pop sound. Lyrically, the song is written from a woman's point of view where she expresses her sense of relief with the end of her troubled relationship.

"Since U Been Gone" received positive reviews from music critics who considered the song to be the highlight of Breakaway. Critics also felt that it was one of the best pop songs in the last decade. Rolling Stone ranked it at number 482 of the 500 Greatest Songs of All Time in 2010 and at number 93 in the revamped 2021 ranking, while Billboard ranked it as the fifth greatest pop song of all time. "Since U Been Gone" was a commercial success. In the United States, the song peaked at number two on the Billboard Hot 100. It topped the US Pop 100 for six consecutive weeks and the US Pop Songs for seven consecutive weeks respectively. It was certified platinum by the Recording Industry Association of America (RIAA) for shipments of over one million copies sold. It was also the fourth-best selling song of 2005 in the US. "Since U Been Gone" was also a worldwide success, peaking in the top five in Austria, Australia, Ireland, the Netherlands, and the United Kingdom. It also peaked in the top ten in Norway, Germany, and Switzerland. In November 2025, it became Clarkson's first song to achieve one billion streams on Spotify.

Clarkson performed "Since U Been Gone" at the 2005 MTV Video Music Awards and at the 2006 BRIT Awards. It has been included on the set-list of Clarkson's many tours. The song's accompanying music video was directed by Alex De Rakoff, which shows Clarkson ruining her ex-boyfriend's apartment. The music video was nominated for three awards in the 2005 MTV Music Awards, winning two out of the three awards namely Best Female Video and Best Pop Video. At the 48th Grammy Awards, the song won the award for Best Female Pop Vocal Performance. "Since U Been Gone" was covered by many artists, notably the American rock band A Day to Remember, indie rocker Ted Leo as well as the Canadian indie rock band, Tokyo Police Club, and used in the musical & Juliet.

== Background and writing ==
"I went to Max Martin's studio in Sweden. We recorded it there with Max and the co-writer of the song, Lukasz Gottwald. The first time I heard the song I thought it was a little poppy, so I asked if we could rock the track a little. We put some heavier guitars and harder drums on it. Now it's explosive."

— Clarkson's first impression of "Since U Been Gone".

In an interview for Blender, Martin and Dr. Luke revealed that they had originally intended Pink to sing "Since U Been Gone", however, she turned it down. Dr. Luke also explained that Hilary Duff's management was interested in the song but rejected it because Duff could not reach the song's higher notes. It was Clive Davis who convinced Martin and Dr. Luke to give the song to Clarkson, even though they were initially reluctant. Davis said, "Max was looking to move on from what he had done with Backstreet Boys, and I really spent time convincing them that an 'American Idol' winner could bring all the feeling and passion that was required to the song." According to MTV, Clarkson had already finished recording her materials for her second album, Breakaway in late 2004 when she was advised by her A&R to fly to Sweden to meet with Martin and Dr. Luke. Both Martin and Dr. Luke were associated with pop music, but they wanted to produce rock songs. Realizing that her record had more of a rock influence, Clarkson finally agreed to collaborate with them."

"Since U Been Gone" was inspired by indie rock of the early 2000s. In an interview with Billboard, Dr. Luke said:

That was a conscious move by Max and myself, because we were listening to alternative and indie music and talking about some song – I don't remember what it was. I said, "Ah, I love this song,' and Max was like, 'If they would just write a damn pop chorus on it!' It was driving him nuts, because that indie song was sort of on six, going to seven, going to eight, the chorus comes ... and it goes back down to five. It drove him crazy. And when he said that, it was like, light bulb. 'Why don't we do that, but put a big chorus on it?" It worked.

In Rolling Stone in 2011, Dr. Luke made more specific claims about what music had inspired the song:

Either the first or the second thing we did was "Since U Been Gone". We were listening to the Hives and the Strokes, and Max was like, ‘Why can’t they just write a hit chorus?’ And that’s what we did.

Despite these statements, the identity of the song is widely speculated to be the 2003 song "Maps" by Yeah Yeah Yeahs. "Maps" and "Since U Been Gone" share a similar guitar line in its middle eight, and are both in the key of G major. The first significant observation of this was in a satirical 2005 medley of "Since U Been Gone"/"Maps" by Ted Leo, which went viral for using this part of "Since U Been Gone" to transition into "Maps". In 2006, Rolling Stone journalist Rob Sheffield told "Maps" songwriter Karen O about the similarity, to which she responded that it was "like getting bitten by a poisonous varmint" and that "if it wasn't [Kelly Clarkson], it just would've been Ashlee Simpson". The 2015 book The Song Machine by John Seabrook claimed that the song was based on "Maps" as if it was a confirmed fact. In 2025, the music critic Dave Moore speculated that "Hard To Explain" by The Strokes was a more likely candidate, arguing that the instrumental on the verses is almost identical, that Dr. Luke had cited The Strokes as an influence, and noting the song's similarity to "Stroke Of Genie-us" by The Freelance Hellraiser, a highly influential 2001 mashup of "Hard To Explain" with Christina Aguilera's "Genie In A Bottle".

"Since U Been Gone" was the last track that Clarkson recorded for Breakaway; it was recorded in Sweden. At first, Clarkson was not fully convinced by the prospect of recording the song saying, "It didn't have any lyrics and the melody really wasn't finalized ... the track was done on a computer, there was no band on it. My record label was freaking out about it and I was, like, why?" Clarkson also explained that when she first heard "Since U Been Gone", she felt that it sounded a little bit pop for her direction, and she decided to tweak the song musically by incorporating drums and guitars. Clarkson told MTV that the song is about a relationship turned sour although it was going well at the very beginning. The song was officially released to mainstream radio stations in the United States on November 16, 2004, as the lead single of Breakaway.

== Composition and lyrics ==
"Since U Been Gone" (2004)
"Since U Been Gone" received positive review from critics for its infectious hook and refreshing musical arrangements.

"Since U Been Gone" is a pop, pop rock, power pop, bubblegum, and pop-punk breakup power ballad that contains elements of alternative rock and indie rock, and was written and produced by Max Martin and Dr. Luke. The song, which is set in common time with a moderate tempo of 132 beats per minute, is written in the key of G major. Popdose staff noted that the song contains an "electronics-enhanced sheen" over "alt-rock's soft/loud dichotomy". The song also incorporates ringing guitars with plaintive lyrics and a huge chorus. It has a chord progression of G-Am–Em–F, and Clarkson's vocal range in the song spans two octaves from the low note of G_{3} to the high note of G_{5}. Film Laureate of Blogcritics praised "Since U Been Gone" for its "high energy, vocally powered, pop/rock jam with a hook that is infectious". The same opinion was echoed by Entertainment Weekly staff who thought that the song highlighted Clarkson's "sublime" vocals and praised the song for its "addictive" hook. Dave Donnelly of Sputnikmusic compared the musical arrangements of "Since U Been Gone" to Clarkson's "Behind These Hazel Eyes". He opined that the two songs allow the melodies to represent themselves because the tight musical arrangements complement Clarkson's vocals.

The song's narrative is in first person, from the point of view of a woman who is relieved with the end of her relationship. Steve Lampiris of ZME Music lauded Clarkson's vocals as the heart of the song. He praised the way Clarkson sings the chorus, which implies that she was the one who ended the relationship. He also thought that the line "I can breathe for the first time/ I'm so moving on, yeah yeah" was believable "that either her ex is a total prick or she's deserves [sic] an Oscar nom." In an interview with Dan Snierson of Entertainment Weekly, it was noted that Clarkson sang "So together but so broken up inside/ 'Cause I can't breathe" in "Behind These Hazel Eyes", but in "Since U Been Gone", she sang "But since you been gone/ I can breathe for the first time." When asked whether she was a bipolar asthmatic, Clarkson responded that "Behind These Hazel Eyes" is about a dipstick who is unhappy because she has completely screwed up, and "Since U Been Gone" is an expression of relief because her ex is now miserable.

== Response ==
=== Critical reception ===
Upon release, the song received universal acclaim from music critics. In his review for Breakaway, Stephen Thomas Erlewine of MSN considered "Since U Been Gone", "Walk Away", and "You Found Me" as the spine of the album. He added that the songs sound mainstream and youthful. Rohin of Blogcritics gave a positive response to the song, emphasizing that "it is almost one of the best pieces of throwaway pop in recent history". He also thought that the song was a song "that you can roll down the windows of your car and proudly headbang your way through a yellow light somewhere on a suburban side street." Sal Cinquemani of Slant Magazine thought that Clarkson did a good impression of Pat Benatar in "Since U Been Gone". He concluded his review by emphasizing that Breakaway proves that Clarkson has successfully dodged the sophomore slump but "Since U Been Gone" helped her establish her success. The staff of Slant Magazine later ranked "Since U Been Gone" at number thirteen in their list of Best Singles of the Aughts, writing that the song proves Clarkson's powerful ability as a vocalist as well as her versatility as an artist.

Stephen Thompson of NPR Music called the song "one of the decade's finest pop anthems" which is infused with energy, charisma and full-throated intensity. Steve Lampiris of ZME Music opined that the song is "one of very few perfect pop songs released in the last ten years," stating that it is hard to determine the principal reason that makes the song very successful. Gary Trust of Billboard thought that "Since U Been Gone" is a defining song of the 2000s. He commented on its status as a blueprint for female pop songs, as seen in song productions by artists such as Miley Cyrus, Katy Perry and Pink. In 2014, Ryan Kailath of NPR Music argued that the song succeeded by borrowing from musical trends that preceded it, such as 1990s R&B and alternative rock. In 2015, Gary Trust of Billboard wrote that "Kelly Clarkson's "Since U Been Gone", co-written by Max Martin, especially helped lead to pure pop's reemergence, and the breakthroughs of Rihanna, Katy Perry, [Taylor] Swift and Lady Gaga would soon follow (as well as [Britney] Spears' own revival)", stating that the song "began to erode hip-hop's early '00s reign, with women at the forefront of turning the tide."

=== Awards and recognition ===
At the 48th Grammy Awards, "Since U Been Gone" won the category of Best Female Pop Vocal Performance. At the 2005 Teen Choice Awards, the song won the category of Choice Single. It also won the award for Best Pop Sing-Along Song at the 2005 XM Nation Music Awards. The song received a nomination in the category of Song of the Year: Mainstream Hit Radio at the 2005 Radio Music Awards but lost to Mariah Carey's "We Belong Together". At the 2005 Billboard Music Awards, the song received nominations for two awards. It received a nomination for the Hot 100 Single of the Year but lost to Mariah Carey's "We Belong Together" and for the Digital Song of the Year but lost to Gwen Stefani's "Hollaback Girl". In 2023, Billboard named "Since U Been Gone" the fifth-best pop song of all time, the highest-ranked song on the list from the 21st century.

== Chart performance ==
"Since U Been Gone" entered the Billboard Hot 100 at number 70 for the week ending December 18, 2004. On its second week, the song moved to number 53, before jumping to number 38 the following week. During the week ending April 9, 2005, "Since U Been Gone" ascended to its peak of number two on the Billboard Hot 100. The song also became the first non-R&B/hip hop song by a female artist to reach the top two on the chart since Christina Aguilera's "Beautiful" in February 2003. Fred Bronson of Billboard noted that had "Since U Been Gone" moved to number one, it would become the 41st chart-topper for the American Idol franchise. The song stayed in the top 10 on the Billboard Hot 100 for 20 weeks. After the week ending March 26, 2005, the song topped the US Pop 100 for six consecutive weeks, through the week ending March 26, 2005. It also spent seven consecutive weeks at number one on the US Pop Songs. On the Billboard's Radio Songs chart, the song peaked at number four on April 23, 2005. Throughout 2005, it sold 960,341 digital copies in the US. "Since U Been Gone" was certified platinum by the Recording Industry Association of America (RIAA) on January 25, 2006. As of September 2017, "Since U Been Gone" has sold 2,973,000 paid digital downloads.

Internationally, "Since U Been Gone" was a commercial success. In Australia, the song debuted and peaked at number three on February 13, 2005. It was certified platinum by the Australian Recording Industry Association (ARIA) for shipments of over 70,000 units. In New Zealand, Since U Been Gone debuted at number 18 on the week ending March 21, 2005. Three weeks later, it peaked at number 11 and matched that position for three non-consecutive weeks. On July 16, 2005, "Since U Been Gone" debuted and peaked at number five in the United Kingdom. It was certified triple platinum by the British Phonographic Industry (BPI), denoting sales and streams of 1,800,000 track-equivalent units. In Ireland, it entered the Irish Singles Chart at number eight on the week ending July 7, 2005 and peaked at number four three weeks later. Elsewhere in Europe, the song was also a success; it peaked at number three in Austria, number seven in Switzerland, number nine in Norway, number 10 in the Netherlands, and number 16 in Sweden.

== Music video ==
=== Background ===
The music video for "Since U Been Gone" was directed by Alex De Rakoff and filmed in early November 2004. Clarkson told MTV that she conceived the idea of the video after assuming that revenge is what every girl wants to do when their boyfriend cheats on them. She added, "You know, 'Why don't I just go trash her house? [...] And so I do it in the video. All I do is break stuff. It's a cool job. I could get used to this." Clarkson expressed that in the music video, viewers would get to see her act out of character. She explained, "In the beginning, I'm like tipping things over and smearing mud all over the walls and it seems like my apartment, but it ends up being the other girl's that he's with, so it's a humorous video." The music video premiered on Total Request Live alongside the single.

=== Synopsis ===
The music video begins with Clarkson sitting on a couch in an apartment's living room, holding a heart-shaped locket in her hand. The next scene shows Clarkson in the bathroom where she fixes her face in the mirror, she opens the medicine cabinet and tossing all the pills in the medicine cabinet over her shoulder and messing all the bathroom items on the floor, squirting the toothpaste into the sink. When she gets to a container of birth control pills, she turns on the water in the sink, snaps the pills out, and drops them down the drain. Clarkson then starts to take other items; she throws a container of makeup powder spray in the air and smears a container of facial mud mask on the wall. During the chorus, Clarkson and her band perform the song for a dancing crowd in a club. After the first chorus, Clarkson walks into a room full of closets. She cuts up dresses, rifling through the closets and pulling out clothes, destroying them and singing in a pile of them. After the second chorus, she walks into a bedroom and begins to tear the pillow on the bed, filling the room with feathers. The scenes of Clarkson singing with her band then alternate with a montage of her destroying the apartment, breaks the glass window from the door, breaks the vase, television, clock, fridge, lights, microwave, phone, furniture, and chair. Later, Clarkson takes a framed photo of her ex-boyfriend with another girl in the living room, before pushing a tall CD rack over. She then smashes the framed photo through a glass table, breaking it in half. Having decimated the apartment, Clarkson walks out the door and down the hallway with a hat on her head, just as her ex-boyfriend appears with his girlfriend, walking arm in arm. Clarkson hides her face as she walks away from them. The final scene shows the couple seeing their damaged apartment in shock and the scene of the locket swinging.

=== Reception and accolades ===
Stephen Thompson of NPR Music was disappointed with the music video because it "undercuts its message to an alarming degree: The words say 'Since you've been gone / I can breathe for the first time,' but the pictures say, 'Breaking up with you necessitates destroying all of your property.'" On the other hand, Johnni Macke of E! felt the video was amusing and Clarkson was "at her rocker prime." She added, "It features the tomboy side of the singer messing up her ex's closet, destroying his bed and getting some major revenge by destroying his place." At the 2005 MTV Video Music Awards, the music video received nominations for three awards; it won Best Female Video and Best Pop Video, and received a nomination for the Viewer's Choice Awards but lost to Green Day's "Boulevard of Broken Dreams". MusicOMH ranked the music video as the 86th best video of the last decade. In February 2012, the music video received a Pop-Up Video treatment by VH1 which shows "pops up" bubbles containing trivia, witticisms and borderline sexual innuendos throughout the video.

As of August 2026, for unknown reasons, the music video on YouTube is currently blocked in the Czech Republic, Denmark, Iceland, Slovakia, and the United States.

== Live performances ==
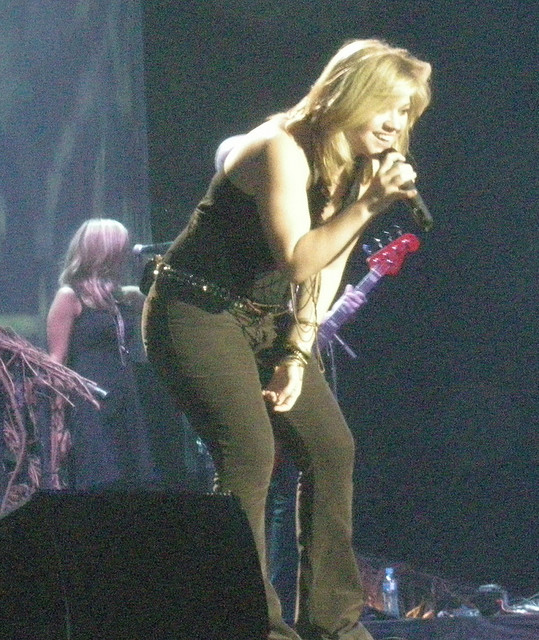
Clarkson performing "Since U Been Gone" during her My December Tour

Clarkson performed "Since U Been Gone" at the 2005 MTV Video Music Awards. Her performance garnered positive reviews from critics, who considered it one of the highlights in the event. Clarkson sang the song as rain cascaded onto the audience. Clarkson told People that one of her favorite moments on television was performing "Since U Been Gone" at the MTV Video Music Awards, saying "I hate being all dressed up, so the fact that I was soaking wet with mascara smeared all over my face was definitely the highlight of my evening!" Kelefa Sanneh of The New York Times thought Clarkson's performance was very solid despite the feeling that she sounded better dry than drenched. Clarkson performed the song on Saturday Night Live in 2005, along with the 2006 BRIT Awards which took place in Earls Court, London.

"Since U Been Gone" has been performed by Clarkson in all of her tours and residencies since the Breakaway Tour. It was included in the setlist of her My December Tour as an encore. While performing at Mohegan Sun Arena, Uncasville, Connecticut, Clarkson performed "Since U Been Gone" and let the audience sing the song's chorus. Clarkson's performance of the song at the Beacon Theatre, New York City stirred crowd into a frenzy, causing the show to be closed abruptly. During her All I Ever Wanted Tour, Clarkson performed the song at the Hammerstein Ballroom, where Caryn Ganz of Rolling Stone remarked that "the room turned into an electric sea of flailing arms and pogo-ing heads." In 2011, Clarkson performed "Since U Been Gone" as well as "Mr. Know It All" on The Ellen DeGeneres Show while promoting her fifth album, Stronger. At the VH1 Divas Celebrates Soul television special, Clarkson performed a medley of "You Keep Me Hangin' On", "Spotlight", "Real Love", and "Since U Been Gone" with Mary J. Blige and Jennifer Hudson. The song was also performed by Clarkson during her 2012 Stronger Tour. While touring at the Times Union Center, Albany, New York, Clarkson performed the song with a musical arrangement. Grey Haymes of Times Union remarked that the song was "re-made and re-modeled with a throbbing, fuzzed-out bassline and an irresistible techno pulse as the foundation for her hook-filled pop song." He also added that it was one of the several surprises from the concert.

== Cover versions and use in media ==
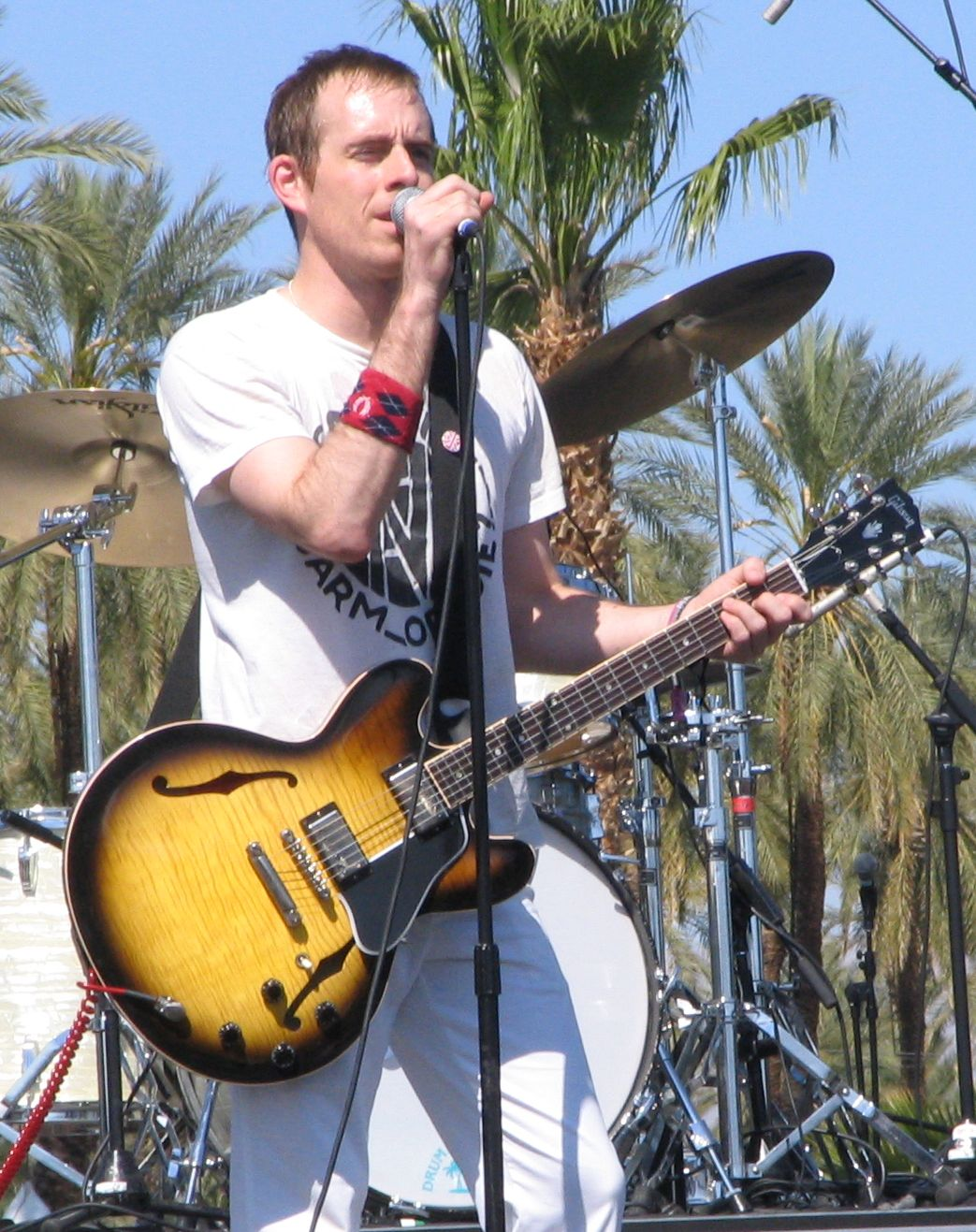
Ted Leo covered "Since U Been Gone" after watching the song's music video.

"Since U Been Gone" has been covered by many artists.

On September 27, 2011, Joseph Gordon-Levitt covered the song in the style of Axl Rose on Late Night with Jimmy Fallon.

The song was also covered by American musician Butch Walker in his 2005 album, Cover Me Badd. Dave Donelly of Sputnikmusic praised Walker's cover for sticking closely to Clarkson's version.

American metalcore band A Day to Remember recorded their own version of "Since U Been Gone" which was included in the reissued version of their album, For Those Who Have Heart.

Indie rock artist Ted Leo recorded an acoustic version of "Since U Been Gone" for a videotaped web session, a few hours after watching the song's music video, which included an interpolation of "Maps" by the Yeah Yeah Yeahs. He commented, "It's just one great hook after another. I also really appreciate the more advanced pop pastiche aspects of it. It's written in a way that is so transparent in terms of drawing from a lot of what's vaguely edgy and popular right now, but put together in such a perfect little package. It's undeniable."

A cover of the song by Canadian indie rock band Tokyo Police Club was included in their "Ten Days, Ten Covers, Ten Years" project where they covered a song every day for ten days. "Since U Been Gone" was sampled in Girl Talk's "Here's The Thing" on his 2008 album, Feed the Animals.

The song was included as the opening track of the American Idol 10th Anniversary – The Hits, a compilation album that celebrates 10 years of American Idol which features tracks from nine winners of the show. The song was parodied on MADtv as "Since We Were On" in a skit about the various performers who came after Clarkson on American Idol.

"Since U Been Gone" has also been covered by contestants from reality television singing competitions. The song was performed by Todrick Hall on the eighth season of American Idol. Despite fulfilling the judges' desire to hear something original, his rendition of the song drew criticism from the judges, with Simon Cowell commenting that Hall seemed like a dancer trying to sing.

On November 26, 2011, Amelia Lily performed the song on the eighth series of The X Factor UK. Her rendition was praised by the judges; Louis Walsh felt that her performance was effortless while Kelly Rowland remarked that "Amelia Lily hits those notes in her sleep!".

The song was also covered by Luke O'Dell on the third season of The X Factor Australia.

On June 13, 2012, John Legend and his duet partner, Meleana Brown, covered "Since U Been Gone" in Duets. Katy Kroll of Rolling Stone lambasted their cover for being "pitchy" and "almost unlistenable", Gord Craig of Leader-Post felt that Brown did not deliver her best although she sounded great with Legend. In the third season of The Sing Off, the winning group Pentatonix sang a "mastermix" of "Since U Been Gone" and "Forget You". All three judges were impressed with Ben Folds commenting "You guys gave voices to the instruments" while Shawn Stockman, praising the rhythm and percussion section, renamed Kevin and Avi "Meat and Potatoes".

"Since U Been Gone" was performed by Ester Dean and Skylar Astin in the 2012 musical comedy film, Pitch Perfect. Lanford Beard of Entertainment Weekly noted that the song was used during the audition sequences in the film, writing "Set to Kelly Clarkson's "Since U Been Gone," it arranged the singers in a clever a cappella tapestry that simultaneously landed laughs and showed off their talents."

Christy Lemire of The Boston Globe was positive of the song's incorporation in the film during the audition process due to its beautiful editing which makes "it feels like a fresh take on the tried-and-true, bad-first-date montage."

The song was used in twelfth season of Brazilian soap opera Malhação.

The song was also used in the first season of Supergirl, and in Unpregnant.

The song is used the musical & Juliet a coming-of-age stage musical featuring the music of Max Martin. For the & Juliet (Original Broadway Cast Recording), Clarkson re-recorded the song along with the Lorna Courtney who plays Juliet.

== Legacy ==
As of 2014, the song has appeared in more than 40 different albums either remixed or in its original format. The song propelled Clarkson to success in mainstream pop music and was regarded as a power pop milestone in the 2000s. Maura Johnston from Billboard asserted that "the song inspired covers from all corners—Ted Leo, Kidz Bop—and helped prime the pop world for tracks like Pink's "Who Knew" and Paramore's "Misery Business", not to mention later Clarkson hits like "My Life Would Suck Without You". Entertainment Weekly put it on its end-of-the-decade "best-of" list, saying, "Can anyone do bitter better? Nothing packs more romantic rage than the original Idol's 2004 kiss-off to a coldhearted ex." The song was ranked by Pitchfork as the 21st best track of the 2000s; they wrote that "'Since U Been Gone' gave us one of the most blunt rallying cries of the last ten years, a perfectly realized sing-along chorus that will be a karaoke staple for years." In 2014, The Atlantic magazine dubbed "Since U Been Gone" as the best pop song of the past decade.

Bill Lamb of About.com ranked the song as the 29th best pop song of all time, expressing that "Kelly Clarkson has stated that she insisted on adding the rock feel to the recording. The result was a record that captured the prevailing sound of mainstream pop with near perfection." NME placed it at number 135 on its list of the "150 Best Tracks of the Past 15 Years", writing "What should have been a slice of American schlock power-pop turned into a brilliant kiss-off, in any genre." The A.V. Club staff rated the song as one of their favorite gleeful breakup songs, writing "The minute that bass and drum machine start, this song is an anthem of the scorned, a call to self-actualization, and an instant hands-in-the-air dance party." Rolling Stone ranked "Since U Been Gone" at number 482 of the 500 Greatest Songs of All Time in 2010, and later at 93 in the 2021 revamped ranking, whose readers listed it as the ninth-ranked single of the last decade. The AOL Radio Staff put the song at number 10 on their list of 10 Best Break Up Songs. "Since U Been Gone" has also appeared in several Billboard lists; in March 2013, it was ranked at number one on its list of Top 100 American Idol Hits of All Time. In April 2017, it appeared at number two of Billboard's 100 greatest choruses of the 21st century and is also one of Clarkson's biggest Billboard Hot 100 hits. The song has been ranked 342nd by Billboard on its 600 most massive smashes over the chart's six decades.

"Since U Been Gone" on select critic rankings
| Publisher | Year | List | Rank | Ref. |
|---|---|---|---|---|
| Beats Per Minute | 2010 | The Top 100 Tracks of the 2000s | 26 | |
| Billboard | 2013 | Top 100 American Idol Hits of All Time | 1 | |
| Blender | 2005 | Top 500 Greatest Songs From 1980–2005 | 92 | |
| The Guardian | 2009 | 1000 Songs Everyone Must Hear | No order | |
| NME | 2012 | 150 Best Tracks of the Past 15 Years | 135 | |
| NPR | 2009 | The 50 Most Important Recordings of the 2000s | No order | |
| Pitchfork | 2008 | The Pitchfork 500 | No order | |
| Pitchfork | 2009 | The 200 Best Songs of the 2000s | 21 | |
| Rolling Stone | 2010 | The 500 Greatest Songs of All Time | 482 | |
| Rolling Stone | 2021 | The 500 Greatest Songs of All Time | 93 | |
| Rolling Stone | 2009 | The Top 100 Songs of the 2000s | 18 | |
| Rolling Stone | 2018 | The 100 Greatest Songs of the Century So Far | 11 | |
| Slant Magazine | 2010 | The 100 Best Singles of the 2000s | 13 | |
| VH1 | 2011 | The 100 Greatest Songs of the 00s | 5 | |

== Track listings ==
- CD single
1. "Since U Been Gone" (radio edit) – 3:08
2. "Since U Been Gone" (AOL live version) – 3:16
- CD maxi single
1. "Since U Been Gone" (radio edit) – 3:08
2. "Since U Been Gone" (AOL live version) – 3:16
3. "Miss Independent" (AOL live version) – 5:12
4. "Since U Been Gone" (Enhanced CD video) – 3:10
- Dance Vault Mixes
1. "Since U Been Gone" (Jason Nevins Rock da Edit) – 3:20
2. "Since U Been Gone" (Jason Nevins Ambient) [Candlelight Mix] – 3:29
3. "Since U Been Gone" (Jason Nevins Club Mixshow) – 5:34
4. "Since U Been Gone" (Jason Nevins Club) – 7:39
5. "Since U Been Gone" (Jason Nevins Dub) – 7:20
6. "Since U Been Gone" (Jason Nevins Radio Edit Instrumental) – 3:50
7. "Since U Been Gone" (Jason Nevins Radio Edit Acappella) – 3:37
8. "Since U Been Gone" (Jason Nevins Reprise) – 5:11

== Credits and personnel ==
Credits are adapted from the liner notes of Breakaway.

Recording

- Recorded by Max Martin, Dr. Luke and Lasse Mårtén at Maratone Studios, Stockholm, Sweden.

Personnel

- Kelly Clarkson – backing vocals, lead vocals
- Dr. Luke – producer, writer, instruments
- Max Martin – producer, writer
- Olle Dahlstedt – bass, guitar, drums
- Şerban Ghenea – mixing

== Charts ==
=== Weekly charts ===
2004–2005 weekly chart performance for "Since U Been Gone"
| Chart (2004–2005) | Peak position |
|---|---|
| Australia (ARIA) | 3 |
| Austria (Ö3 Austria Top 40) | 3 |
| Belgium (Ultratop 50 Flanders) | 22 |
| Belgium (Ultratop 50 Wallonia) | 31 |
| Canada CHR/Pop Top 30 (Radio & Records) | 4 |
| Canada Hot AC Top 30 (Radio & Records) | 2 |
| Eurochart Hot 100 (Billboard) | 5 |
| Germany (GfK) | 6 |
| Greece (IFPI) | 39 |
| Hungary (Editors' Choice Top 40) | 21 |
| Ireland (IRMA) | 4 |
| Italy (FIMI) | 35 |
| Netherlands (Dutch Top 40) | 4 |
| Netherlands (Single Top 100) | 10 |
| New Zealand (Recorded Music NZ) | 11 |
| Norway (VG-lista) | 9 |
| Scottish Singles Sales (Official Charts) | 3 |
| Sweden (Sverigetopplistan) | 16 |
| Switzerland (Schweizer Hitparade) | 7 |
| UK Singles (Official Charts) | 5 |
| US Billboard Hot 100 | 2 |
| US Adult Contemporary (Billboard) | 22 |
| US Adult Pop Airplay (Billboard) | 2 |
| US Dance Club Songs (Billboard) | 22 |
| US Dance Airplay (Billboard) | 1 |
| US Pop Airplay (Billboard) | 1 |
| US Pop 100 (Billboard) | 1 |

2026 weekly chart performance for "Since U Been Gone"
| Chart (2026) | Peak position |
|---|---|
| Israel International Airplay (Media Forest) | 1 |

=== Year-end charts ===
2005 year-end chart performance for "Since U Been Gone"
| Chart (2005) | Position |
|---|---|
| Australia (ARIA) | 22 |
| Austria (Ö3 Austria Top 40) | 42 |
| Belgium (Ultratop 50 Flanders) | 85 |
| Eurochart Hot 100 (Billboard) | 51 |
| Germany (Media Control GfK) | 63 |
| Netherlands (Dutch Top 40) | 11 |
| Netherlands (Single Top 100) | 74 |
| Sweden (Hitlistan) | 76 |
| Switzerland (Schweizer Hitparade) | 59 |
| UK Singles (OCC) | 30 |
| US Billboard Hot 100 | 4 |
| US Adult Contemporary (Billboard) | 48 |
| US Adult Top 40 (Billboard) | 7 |
| US Dance Radio Airplay (Billboard) | 3 |
| US Mainstream Top 40 (Billboard) | 1 |
| US Pop 100 (Billboard) | 1 |
| Venezuela (Record Report) | 39 |

=== Decade-end charts ===
Decade-end chart performance for "Since U Been Gone"
| Chart (2000–2009) | Position |
|---|---|
| US Billboard Hot 100 | 47 |
| US Mainstream Top 40 (Billboard) | 6 |

== Certifications ==
Certifications and sales for "Since U Been Gone"
| Region | Certification | Certified units/sales |
|---|---|---|
| Australia (ARIA) | Platinum | 70,000^{^} |
| Canada (Music Canada) | Platinum | 20,000^{*} |
| Denmark (IFPI Danmark) | Platinum | 90,000^{‡} |
| Germany (BVMI) | Gold | 150,000^{‡} |
| New Zealand (RMNZ) | 4× Platinum | 120,000^{‡} |
| Norway (IFPI Norway) | Gold | 5,000^{‡} |
| United Kingdom (BPI) | 3× Platinum | 1,800,000^{‡} |
| United States (RIAA) | Platinum | 2,973,000 |
| United States (RIAA) Mastertone | Gold | 500,000^{*} |
^{*} Sales figures based on certification alone.^{^} Shipments figures based on certification alone.^{‡} Sales+streaming figures based on certification alone.

== Release history ==
Release dates and formats for "Since U Been Gone"
| Country | Date | Format | Label | Ref(s). |
|---|---|---|---|---|
| United States | November 16, 2004 | Contemporary hit radio | RCA | |
| Germany | December 24, 2004 | Digital download | Sony BMG | |
| Ireland | December 24, 2004 | Digital download | Sony BMG | |
| Luxembourg | December 24, 2004 | Digital download | Sony BMG | |
| Finland | December 27, 2004 | Digital download | Sony BMG | |
| Australia | January 28, 2005 | Maxi single | Sony BMG | |
| United States | March 7, 2005 | Hot adult contemporary radio | RCA | |
| Ireland | March 25, 2005 | Digital download (Dance Vault Remixes) | Sony BMG | |
| Norway | March 28, 2005 | Digital download (Dance Vault Remixes) | Sony BMG | |
| United States | March 29, 2005 | Digital download (Dance Vault Remixes) | RCA | |
| United Kingdom | July 4, 2005 | CD single | Sony BMG | |
| United Kingdom | July 4, 2005 | Maxi single | Sony BMG | |
| Germany | July 18, 2005 | Maxi single | Sony BMG | |
| Germany | August 29, 2005 | CD single | Sony BMG | |
| France | September 21, 2005 | CD single | Sony BMG | |

== See also ==
- List of Billboard Mainstream Top 40 number-one songs of 2005
- List of number-one dance airplay hits of 2005 (U.S.)
