= Behind These Hazel Eyes =

2005 single by Kelly Clarkson

Single by Kelly Clarkson

from the album Breakaway
- Released: April 12, 2005
- Recorded: 2004
- Studio: Maratone (Stockholm); Westlake (Los Angeles)
- Genre: Pop rock
- Length: 3:19
- Label: RCA
- Songwriters: Kelly Clarkson; Max Martin; Luke Gottwald
- Producers: Max Martin; Dr. Luke

Kelly Clarkson singles chronology
"Since U Been Gone" (2004)	"Behind These Hazel Eyes" (2005)	"Because of You" (2005)

Music video
- "Behind These Hazel Eyes" on YouTube

"Behind These Hazel Eyes" is a song by American singer Kelly Clarkson for her second studio album, Breakaway (2004). It was written by Clarkson with the song's producers Max Martin and Dr. Luke. The song was released on April 12, 2005, as the second single from the album. Clarkson considered "Behind These Hazel Eyes" as one of her favorite songs, and she once intended to name Breakaway after the song. "Behind These Hazel Eyes" is an uptempo song that incorporates crunchy guitars pulsated with driving beats and anthemic choruses; it narrates Clarkson's broken relationship with her ex-boyfriend.

"Behind These Hazel Eyes" peaked at number six on the Billboard Hot 100 and stayed inside the top 10 in the chart for 15 weeks, a record for the longest time spent in the top 10 for a song that did not hit top five, until it was beaten by Rihanna's "Needed Me" in 2016. It also became Clarkson's first song to top the Adult Pop Songs chart. It was certified platinum from Recording Industry Association of America for selling over one million digital downloads. Elsewhere, the song charted in the top 10 in Australia, Austria, Ireland, the Netherlands, New Zealand, and the United Kingdom.

The song's accompanying music video was directed by Joseph Kahn and produced by Danyi Deats-Barrett. The concept of the video was conceived by Clarkson and depicts her as a bride who experiences some dream-like hints that her fiancé is having an affair with a brunette ceremony attendee. The music video premiered online at MTV, and it also received heavy rotation on Total Request Live. The song was performed live by Clarkson at numerous venues, including the Breakaway World Tour (2005) and the All I Ever Wanted Tour (2009).

== Background and writing ==
In 2004, Kelly Clarkson flew to Sweden to collaborate with Max Martin and Lukasz "Dr. Luke" Gottwald for her album, Breakaway. Clarkson and Martin were interested in turning in a more rock direction, as opposed to the "slick pop" with which they were identified. The songs "Since U Been Gone", as well as "Behind These Hazel Eyes", were the products of their collaboration. According to Dr. Luke, "Behind These Hazel Eyes" was sent to Clarkson without any lyrics as part of an olive branch to the singer. He explained,

We had just done with "Since U Been Gone," which everyone was happy with. We sent a rough version of "Behind These Hazel Eyes," without any lyrics, to Kelly and Clive Davis. It was in part an olive branch to Kelly, because there was miscommunication on "Since U Been Gone," where Kelly had written some lyrics and Max and I didn't know about it and we had finished the song. So we wanted to write "Behind" with her from the beginning, but we were in different places. She had just won American Idol and was on tour, so she'd e-mail me lyrics, and I'd e-mail her my thoughts.

In an interview with Entertainment Weekly, Clarkson explained that "Behind These Hazel Eyes" is "about the dipstick who completely screwed up and now is unhappy and you're happy." She also considered the song as one of her favorites that she once intended to name Breakaway after the song. Critics speculated that the song reflects Clarkson's break-up with David Hodges, an ex-member of Evanescence. According to MTV, the song was originally written prior to the break-up. Nonetheless, Clarkson decided to tweak the song lyrics after breaking up with Hodges to express her emotional pain. Clarkson also said that the song almost did not make it into the album. She explained, "It had different lyrics in the beginning [...] I ended up calling Luke [Lukasz Gottwald], the writer, and we did a totally different song to it. It's now my favorite song on the record. Crappy relationships [make for] a good song."

== Composition ==
"Behind These Hazel Eyes" (2004)
The 19-second chorus of "Behind These Hazel Eyes", which features the dominant sound of electric guitar

"Behind These Hazel Eyes" is a pop rock power ballad that was written by Clarkson, Max Martin, and Dr. Luke and produced by the latter two. Sheet music for the song shows common time with a moderate tempo of 90 beats per minute, in the key of A major, with the vocal range spanning over two octaves from E_{3} to F♯_{5}. The bridge was the only part of the song that was written by Dr. Luke and Martin together with Clarkson face to face. The song begins with Clarkson wailing "oh oh oh" over a restless percussion. In the first verse, the music becomes quiet to focus on Clarkson's vocals, as she wails, "Seems like just yesterday/You were a part of me/I used to stand so tall/I used to be so strong/Your arms around me tight/Everything it felt so right/Unbreakable like nothing could go wrong." During the chorus, the sound of electronic guitar is dominant as she vocalizes, "Here I am/Once again/I'm torn into pieces/Can't deny it/Can't pretend/Just thought you were the one/Broken up deep inside/But you won't get to see the tears I cry/Behind these hazel eyes." Gil Kaufman of MTV noticed that the song "soared on crunchy guitars, driving beats, and anthemic, agitated choruses."

Lyrically, the song narrates the story of a failed relationship that initially started off well. Clarkson regrets having allowed herself to be vulnerable to her ex-boyfriend, and she is determined that despite the pain that she feels, he will not get the satisfaction of seeing her cry. Michael Paoletta of Billboard praised Clarkson's vocals, writing, "Clarkson simply delivers a loose, tour-de-force vocal that simmers alongside a steroid-charged musical backdrop that is fun, fast, and furious." Scott Juba of The Trade praised the production of the song, writing, "The song's strong hook pulls listeners in and involves them in the lyrics without ever becoming gimmicky or manipulative." He also complimented Clarkson's vocal performance, which "oscillates between pain and defiance with near pinpoint accuracy."

== Reception and accolades ==
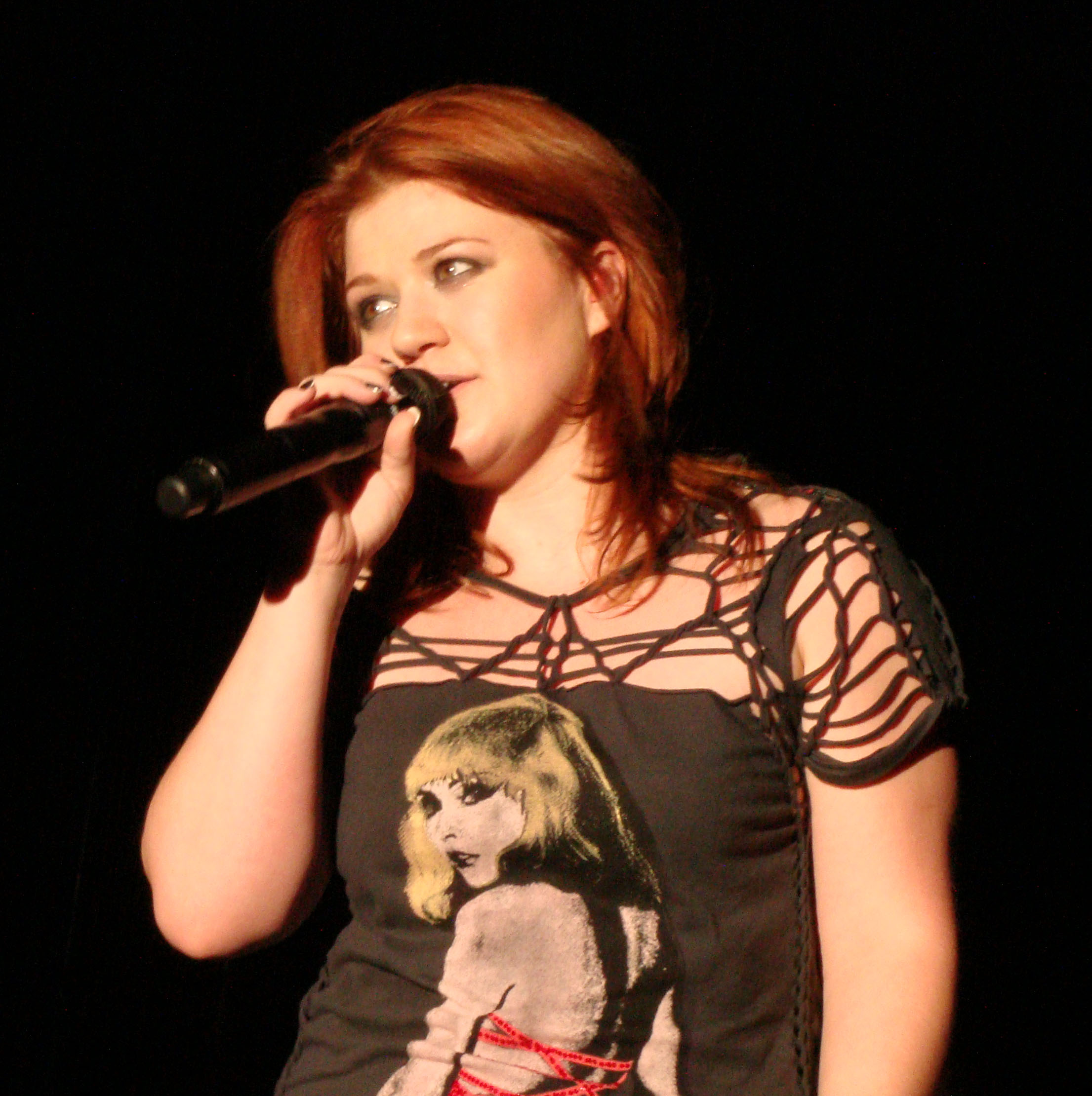
Critics thought that "Behind These Hazel Eyes" showcases Clarkson's vocal prowess.

Elizabeth Scott of Sky Living wrote, "while Clarkson is doing well musically, her love life still hasn't picked up and she is heartbroken once again. I'm sure the thought of another top-10 hit might cheer her up!" Scott Juba of The Trades considered "Behind These Hazel Eyes" as the highlight of the album, writing, "Now that [Clarkson is] a few years older than she was when she recorded her first album, she brings more authenticity to relationship songs." Evan Sawdey of PopMatters compared "Don't Let Me Stop You" (2009) with "Behind These Hazel Eyes", saying that the former "may sound like another rewrite of an older Clarkson hit (in this case, "Behind These Hazel Eyes"), but the observational lyrics about a questionable relationship are what ultimately makes the whole thing click." Charles Merwin of Stylus Magazine felt that the song should sell records more because "the entire musical backing drops out to let Clarkson's voice through to live or die on its own."

Pam Avoledo of Blogcritics believed that "Behind These Hazel Eyes" was superior to the writing of "Since U Been Gone", commenting, "It's punchier, well-written, and gives Clarkson a chance to show off her vocal skills without the trendy haughtiness." Joe Cross of Cox Communications thought that "Behind These Hazel Eyes" was a decent follow-up to "Since U Been Gone", saying "It's no "Since U Been Gone", which is just a pop-rock juggernaut, but as follow-ups go, it's not too shabby. Clarkson's down-home everything (well, mostly her looks) sells these little heartbreak haikus exceptionally well." He also listed "Behind These Hazel Eyes" as one of the 40 songs that defined the summer of 2005. The same sentiment was echoed by Robert Copsey of Digital Spy, who considered the song as Clarkson's second-best single after "Since U Been Gone", writing, "It proved a slow burner at the time of release, but this track's greatness continues to be realised over time."

"Behind These Hazel Eyes" was listed at number five on Billboard magazine's list of Songs of the Summer of 2005. In 2015, the same publication ranked the song at number four on its list of Top 100 American Idol Hits of All Time. It also appeared at number three on the list of Kelly Clarkson's Top 15 Biggest Billboard Hot 100 Hits. Chris Kal of WKNS ranked "Behind These Hazel Eyes" at number four in his list of "Top 10 Summer Songs From 2005". Sam Lansky of PopCrush described the song as "a surefire fan favorite" and ranked it at number nine in his list of "Top 10 Kelly Clarkson songs". Bill Lamb of About.com put the song at number 62 on his list of "Top 100 Pop Songs of 2005". The song was nominated in the category for Song of the Year: Mainstream Hit Radio in the 2005 Radio Music Awards. At the 24th ASCAP Pop Music Awards, the song was honored with the Most Performed Songs award. In January 2010, "Behind These Hazel Eyes" was the fifth-most-played song of the last decade by American Idol performers. According to Nielsen Broadcast Data Systems, the song has been played 513,149 times through the week ending March 24, 2010.

== Chart performance ==
"Behind These Hazel Eyes" debuted at number 87 on the Billboard Hot 100 on the week ending, April 23, 2005. The song stayed inside the top 10 on Billboard Hot 100 for 15 weeks before peaking at number six on the week ending June 11, 2005. It consequently held the record as the song with the most weeks in the chart's top 10 without hitting the top five, before being surpassed by Rihanna's "Needed Me", which spent 16 weeks in the top 10, but only peaked at number seven 11 years later in 2016.

On the week ending May 28, 2005, "Behind These Hazel Eyes" jumped from number seven to number three on the Billboard Pop 100 Airplay chart. With "Since U Been Gone" holding steady at number two, the ascent made Clarkson the first artist with two songs in the top three of the chart. The song also appeared on the US Pop Songs at number 30 on the week ending April 30, 2005, and peaked at number two on the week ending July 9, 2005. It spent seven consecutive weeks at number two and was held off the top spot by Mariah Carey's "We Belong Together". It became the 16th-ranked single of the 2000s decade on the Pop Songs chart compiled by Billboard. On the Billboard's Radio Songs, the song peaked at number four on August 6, 2005. On the week ending August 27, 2005, the song topped the Adult Top 40 and stayed in the position for five consecutive weeks. On January 31, 2008, "Behind These Hazel Eyes" was certified platinum by the Recording Industry Association of America. The song has sold 1,644,000 digital copies in the United States as of September 2017.

Internationally, "Behind These Hazel Eyes" was a commercial success. In Australia, the song debuted and peaked at number six on the week ending July 3, 2005. In New Zealand, the song entered New Zealand Singles Chart and peaked at number seven on the week ending July 4, 2005, as the highest debut of the week. In the United Kingdom, the song also debuted and peaked at number nine on the week ending October 1, 2005. In Ireland, the song debuted at number nine on the week ending September 22, 2005, and peaked at number four on the week ending November 3, 2005.

== Music video ==
=== Background and release ===
The music video was directed by Joseph Kahn and produced by Danyi Deats-Barrett. It was shot for two days in April 2005 in Toronto at a church and a sound stage, while Clarkson was on the Breakaway Tour. According to Kahn, Clarkson was sick during the production and could not speak. During Clarkson's wardrobe fitting, they communicated together using notes written by her. Though she is seen speaking and is interviewed in the behind the scenes footage. Access Hollywood reported that a single sprinkler was used to produce rain in the music video. The concept of the music video was conceived by Clarkson. She explained, "The whole thing is a metaphor about a broken fairy tale [...] You think everything is going well, and then reality kicks your butt. It's kind of a sad video, but it's going to be my best one. It's real, and that's why people like me." Clarkson also added that after the production of the music video was completed, she had bruises and a green-and-yellow splotch on her left biceps. Future WWE and AEW commentator and interviewer Renee Paquette appears in the background. The music video premiered online on May 9, 2005, on MTV. On May 16, 2005, it premiered on Total Request Live, where it debuted at number five on the chart the following day.

=== Synopsis ===
The music video begins with Clarkson standing in a room wearing a white wedding dress. Holding a bouquet of red roses, she is surrounded by her bridesmaids as they prepare for her wedding. She sits down on a sofa and sees a wedding photo of her fiancé with another woman as a storm grows outside. The bridesmaids are unable to close the windows, so they run out of the room leaving Clarkson alone, who is seen dropping the bouquet of roses, as well as the wedding photo from her hands onto the floor. The next scene shows Clarkson walking down the aisle in a church wearing a black dress. She sees a bride standing at the altar with her fiancé, getting married. When she draws the veil of the bride, she realizes that the bride is the woman from the photo.

Clarkson, who is now wearing a white wedding dress, runs out of the church and into a dark swamp. A montage of Clarkson singing with her band in a dark swamp is shown alternately with scenes of Clarkson running in the forest and lying on the ground. Clarkson is also seen standing inside an abandoned house, wearing a voluminous black dress. As the rain starts to fall, Clarkson finally collapses, kneeling on the ground while looking at and being comforted by her other self, who is singing with the band.

The scene shifts to a present day, where Clarkson is standing at the altar, exchanging vows with her fiancé. Before he puts the ring on her finger, she looks at the guests and notices that the woman from the photo is among the audience. She sees her fiancé exchanging a smile with the woman as the woman blows him a kiss. Clarkson then reaches for the ring and throws it at her fiancé, before running away from the altar. She throws her wedding bouquet into the lap of the woman and shoves her way past the wedding guests, who are trying to stop her from leaving. The video ends with Clarkson stepping out the doors into the bright sunlight.

=== Reception ===
James Dinh of MTV Newsroom listed "Behind These Hazel Eyes" as one of the music videos with "a bad case of the runaway bride syndrome," writing, "Throughout the clip, Clarkson finds herself running through a swampy mud land until she snaps out of her visions, refuses to proceed with the wedding and makes a shocking escape out of the church." Andrea Holmes of AOL ranked "Behind These Hazel Eyes" at number five in her list of "Top Wedding Music Videos: 15 Clips for the Big 'I Do'." She commented, "The perfect illustration of our point about wedding videos, 'Behind These Hazel Eyes' takes an atypical approach to marriage [...] Throughout the video, the weather is dark and rainy, matching the story line, but when Clarkson ditches the wedding and runs out of the church, she is greeted with sunshine. Johnni Macke of E! opined that the video was intense, writing, "She is heartbroken and "torn into pieces" throughout the video once she discovers her love is marrying someone else, and it results in epic cemetery rock sessions and rolling in the mud." Lyndsey Parker of Yahoo! Music put the song's music video at number 22 on her list of the best matrimony-themed musical videos of all time.

In an interview with MTV, the lead vocalist of Yellowcard, Ryan Key, praised Clarkson in the music video. He said, "She is so unbelievably gorgeous in that video that is all over TV right now [...] The wet wedding dress and the wet hair and ... come on, man! Who knew? She is so hot. She looks so good in it." Robert Copsey of Digital Spy opined that the music video is Clarkson's best video to date. The music video had a successful run at Total Request Live, where it topped the chart for 33 days, a record that Clarkson holds for the longest stay by a female artist at number one on the chart.

== Live performances ==
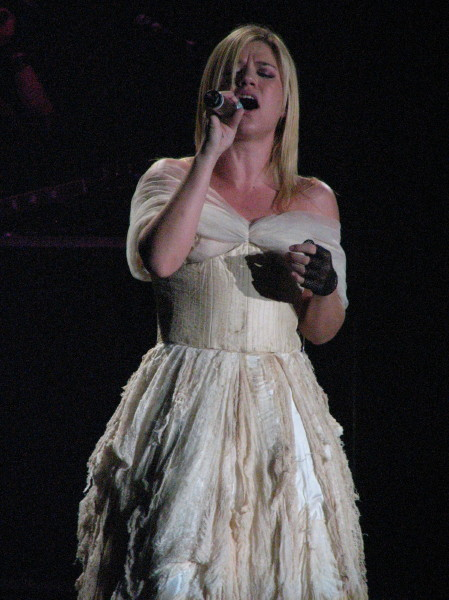
Clarkson performing the song wearing the wedding dress featured in its music video

"Behind These Hazel Eyes" was included in the setlist of Clarkson's Breakaway World Tour (2005). During her concert tour at Germain Arena, Clarkson performed the song wearing the same wedding dress she wore in the song's music video. Clarkson also performed "Behind These Hazel Eyes" on her All I Ever Wanted Tour (2009). While touring at Hammerstein Ballroom, New York City, Clarkson sang the stripped-down version of the song, accompanied by guitars and vocal. Caryn Ganz of Rolling Stone felt that Alanis Morissette's influence was evident on the chorus of "Behind These Hazel Eyes", which was performed acoustically in the event. Clarkson explained that the arrangement was intended to maximize audience sing-along potential, which Jim Cantiello of MTV thought was effective. In December 2011, Clarkson also performed "Behind These Hazel Eyes" on Chicago Theatre as part of the Miracle on State Street benefit concert. Bob Gendron of the Chicago Tribune reviewed Clarkson's performance, writing, "the Texas native could've impressed simply by projecting her booming voice and relishing its prodigious range. Yet she seemed determined to reinforce female empowerment themes often missing from her mainstream-pop contemporaries' hits."

== Cover versions ==
"Behind These Hazel Eyes" was covered by Cassadee Pope in the third season of The Voice in 2012. According to Pope, she decided to sing the song to reach out to her father who divorced from her mother when she was 11 years old. Her rendition was praised by Christina Aguilera saying, "I got to feel your heart."

== Track listings ==
- Digital download and CD single
1. "Behind These Hazel Eyes" (Album Version) – 3:16
2. "Behind These Hazel Eyes" (Live @ Sony Connect) – 3:39
3. "Behind These Hazel Eyes" (Enhanced CD Video) - 3:16
- Behind These Hazel Eyes – EP
1. "Behind These Hazel Eyes" (Joe Bermudez & Josh Harris Mixshow Edit) – 3:29
2. "Behind These Hazel Eyes" (Joe Bermudez & Josh Harris Mixshow Remix) – 5:24
3. "Behind These Hazel Eyes" (Joe Bermudez & Josh Harris Mixshow Instrumental) – 5:25
4. "Behind These Hazel Eyes" (Joe Bermudez & Josh Harris Top 40 Radio Remix) – 3:10
5. "Behind These Hazel Eyes" (Joe Bermudez & Josh Harris Acappella) – 2:58

== Credits and personnel ==
Recording

- Recorded by Max Martin, Dr. Luke, Lasse Marten and Kevin M. Guarnieri at Maratone Studios, Stockholm, Sweden and Dr. Luke's NYC & Westlake Audio, Los Angeles, California.

Personnel

- Kelly Clarkson – lead vocals and background vocals
- Shawn Pelton - drums, background vocals
- Dr. Luke – producer, instruments
- Max Martin – producer, instruments
- Johan "Brorsan" Brorsson – pro-tools engineer
- John Hanes – pro-tools engineer
- Serban Ghenea – mixing
- Tim Roberts – mixing assistant

Credits adapted from the liner notes of Breakaway.

== Charts ==
=== Weekly charts ===
2005–2006 weekly chart performance for "Behind These Hazel Eyes"
Chart (2005–2006)	Peak position
Australia (ARIA)	6
Austria (Ö3 Austria Top 40)	9
Belgium (Ultratop 50 Flanders)	23
Belgium (Ultratip Bubbling Under Wallonia)	4
Canada CHR/Pop Top 30 (Radio & Records)	3
Canada Hot AC Top 30 (Radio & Records)	1
Czech Republic Airplay (ČNS IFPI)	35
Denmark Airplay (Tracklisten)	13
Germany (GfK)	16
Greece (IFPI)	26
Hungary (Editors' Choice Top 40)	12
Ireland (IRMA)	4
Netherlands (Dutch Top 40)	7
Netherlands (Single Top 100)	15
New Zealand (Recorded Music NZ)	7
Scottish Singles Sales (Official Charts)	6
Sweden (Sverigetopplistan)	21
Switzerland (Schweizer Hitparade)	20
UK Singles (Official Charts)	9
US Billboard Hot 100	6
US Adult Contemporary (Billboard)	13
US Adult Pop Airplay (Billboard)	1
US Pop Airplay (Billboard)	2
US Pop 100 (Billboard)	3

2020 weekly chart performance for "Behind These Hazel Eyes"
Chart (2020)	Peak position
Poland Airplay (ZPAV)	97

=== Year-end charts ===
2005 year-end chart performance for "Behind These Hazel Eyes"
Chart (2005)	Position
Netherlands (Dutch Top 40)	45
Netherlands (Single Top 100)	68
UK Singles (OCC)	70
US Billboard Hot 100	10
US Adult Contemporary (Billboard)	35
US Adult Top 40 (Billboard)	11
US Dance Radio Airplay (Billboard)	30
US Mainstream Top 40 (Billboard)	2
Venezuela (Record Report)	31

2006 year-end chart performance for "Behind These Hazel Eyes"
Chart (2006)	Position
Austria (Ö3 Austria Top 40)	67

== Certifications ==
Certifications and sales for "Behind These Hazel Eyes"
Region	Certification	Certified units/sales
Canada (Music Canada)	Platinum	20,000^{*}
New Zealand (RMNZ)	Gold	15,000^{‡}
United Kingdom (BPI)	Silver	200,000^{‡}
United States (RIAA)	Platinum	1,644,000
^{*} Sales figures based on certification alone.^{‡} Sales+streaming figures based on certification alone.

== Release history ==
Release dates and formats for "Behind These Hazel Eyes"
Country	Date	Format	Label	Ref(s).
United States	April 12, 2005	Contemporary hit radio	RCA	
Australia	June 17, 2005	Maxi single	Sony BMG	
France	August 1, 2005	Digital download (Dance Vault Remixes)	Sony BMG	
Ireland	September 9, 2005	Digital download	Sony BMG	
Germany	September 9, 2005	Digital download	Sony BMG	
Norway	September 12, 2005	Digital download	Sony BMG	
United Kingdom	September 19, 2005	CD single	Sony BMG	
United Kingdom	September 19, 2005	Maxi single	Sony BMG	
Germany	October 21, 2005	Maxi single	Sony BMG	
Germany	October 28, 2005	CD single	Sony BMG	
