= List of Kelly Clarkson promotional tours =

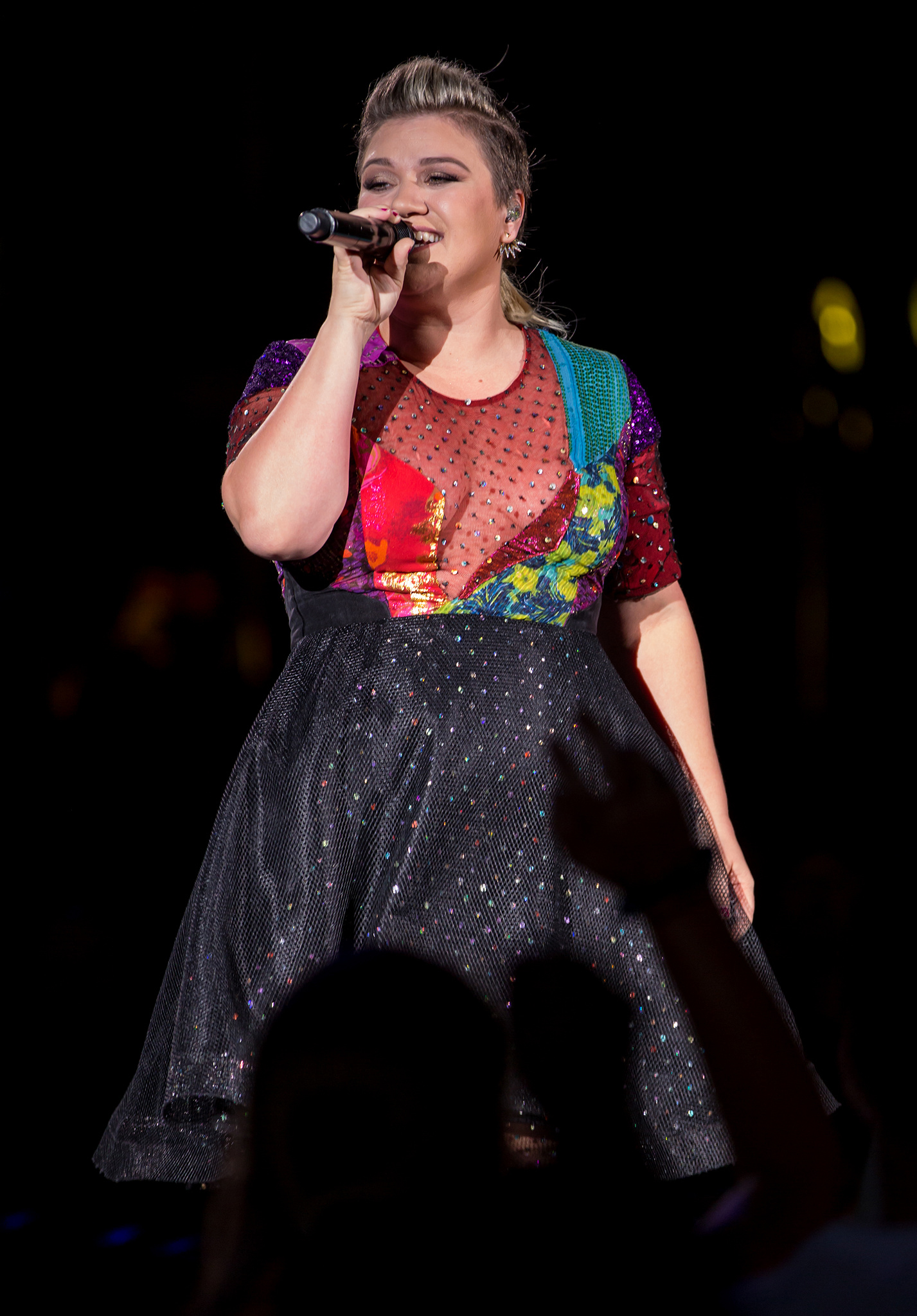
Clarkson in 2015

The following is a comprehensive list of American pop singer Kelly Clarkson's promotional tours. The singer has also been on numerous headlining and co-headlining concert tours.

== 2003: Kelly Clarkson in Concert ==
Kelly Clarkson in Concert
- Promotional tour by Kelly Clarkson
- Associated album: Thankful
- Start date: August 6, 2003
- End date: August 16, 2003
- Legs: 1
- No. of shows: 8

Kelly Clarkson concert chronology
- Kelly Clarkson in Concert (2003); Independent Tour (2004)

Kelly Clarkson in Concert is a promotional tour by American pop rock artist, Kelly Clarkson. The tour supported her debut album, Thankful. Primarily visiting the United States, the singer played state and county fairs, along with theatres. Stops in California were cancelled due to illness and were unable to be rescheduled. Clarkson's setlist composed of songs from her album and covers from Aretha Franklin, Garth Brooks, Reba McEntire, Bonnie Raitt, Aerosmith and No Doubt. The tour was proposed to include Japan and the United Kingdom, however, it did not come to fruition.

=== Setlist ===
1. "Low"
2. "What's Up Lonely"
3. "Some Kind of Miracle"
4. "You Thought Wrong"
5. "Just Missed the Train"
6. "How Will I Know" – (Whitney Houston cover)
7. "Love Takes Time" – (Mariah Carey cover)
8. "Why Haven't I Heard from You" – (Reba cover)
9. "Somewhere Other Than the Night" – (Garth Brooks cover)
10. "(You Make Me Feel Like) A Natural Woman" – (Aretha Franklin cover)
11. "Spiderwebs" – (No Doubt cover)
12. "Eat the Rich" – (Aerosmith cover)
13. "Something to Talk About" – (Bonnie Raitt cover)
14. "Thankful"

Encore

15. "Miss Independent"
16. "A Moment Like This"

=== Tour dates ===
Date	City	Country	Venue
August 6, 2003	La Crosse	United States	La Crosse Center
August 8, 2003^{[A]}	Indianapolis	United States	Marsh Grandstand
August 9, 2003^{[B]}	West Allis	United States	Miller Time Main Stage
August 10, 2003	Davenport	United States	Adler Theatre
August 12, 2003^{[C]}	Midland	United States	Midland County Fairgrounds
August 14, 2003^{[D]}	Hamburg	United States	Buffalo.com Grandstand
August 15, 2003	Clarkston	United States	DTE Energy Music Theatre
August 16, 2003^{[E]}	Escanaba	United States	Upper Peninsula State Fairgrounds

Festivals and other miscellaneous performances
^{A} This concert was a part of the "Indiana State Fair"
^{B} This concert was a part of the "Wisconsin State Fair"
^{C} This concert was a part of the "Midland County Fair"
^{D} This concert was a part of the "Erie County Fair"
^{E} This concert was a part of the "Upper Peninsula State Fair"

Cancellations and rescheduled shows

August 26, 2005	Sacramento, California	Cal Expo Amphitheater	Cancelled. This concert was a part of the "California State Fair".
August 28, 2005	Lancaster, California	Antelope Valley Fairgrounds	Cancelled. This concert was a part of the "Antelope Valley Fair"
September 4, 2005	Madera, California	Madera County Fairgrounds	Cancelled. This concert was a part of the "Madera District County Fair".

== 2009: Kelly Clarkson: Live in Concert ==
Kelly Clarkson: Live in Concert
- Promotional tour by Kelly Clarkson
- Promotional poster for UVUphoria
- Associated album: All I Ever Wanted
- Start date: March 28, 2009
- End date: September 12, 2009
- Legs: 1
- No. of shows: 28 in North America; 1 in Europe; 29 Total

Kelly Clarkson concert chronology
- 2 Worlds 2 Voices Tour (2008); Kelly Clarkson: Live in Concert (2009); All I Ever Wanted Tour (2009–10)

Kelly Clarkson: Live in Concert also known as the All I Ever Wanted Summer Fair Tour, is a promotional tour by American pop artist, Kelly Clarkson. The tour promoted her fourth studio album, All I Ever Wanted. For the tour, Clarkson played at state and county fairs, along with, radio and college festivals in the United States, Canada, and England.

=== Opening acts ===
- Gavin DeGraw (select dates)
- Eric Hutchinson (select dates)
- Krista (select dates)
- The Lost Boys (Kelseyville)

=== Setlist ===
1. "All I Ever Wanted"
2. "Miss Independent"
3. "I Do Not Hook Up"
4. "Some Guys Have All The Luck" – (Rod Stewart cover) *Changed to "Some Girls Have All The Luck"
5. "Don't Let Me Stop You"
6. "Breakaway"
7. "If I Can't Have You"
8. "Never Again"
9. "Behind These Hazel Eyes"
10. "Walkin' After Midnight" – (Patsy Cline cover)
11. "Cry"
12. "I Want You"
13. "Whyyawannabringmedown"
14. "Because of You"
15. "Walk Away"
16. "Since U Been Gone"

Encore

17. "Already Gone"
18. "If"
19. Janet Jackson
19. "My Life Would Suck Without You"

Notes

- During the concert in Thackerville, Clarkson performed "The Greatest Man I Never Knew"
- "Whyyawannabringmedown" and "If" were not performed in York and Allegan.

=== Tour dates ===
Date	City	Country	Venue
North America
March 28, 2009^{[A]}	Orlando	United States	Universal Music Plaza Stage
April 29, 2009^{[B]}	Tucson	United States	Arizona Stadium
May 4, 2009^{[C]}	Boston	United States	House of Blues
May 9, 2009^{[D]}	Irvine	United States	Verizon Wireless Amphitheatre
May 14, 2009^{[E]}	Prior Lake	United States	Mystic Showroom
May 16, 2009^{[F]}	East Rutherford	United States	Izod Center
Europe
June 7, 2009^{[G]}	London	England	Emirates Stadium
North America
June 11, 2009^{[H]}	Orem	United States	Brent Brown Ballpark
June 13, 2009^{[I]}	Bridgeview	United States	Toyota Park
July 3, 2009	Indio	United States	Fantasy Springs Special Events Center
July 5, 2009^{[J]}	Del Mar	United States	Heineken Grandstand
July 9, 2009^{[K]}	Calgary	Canada	Pengrowth Saddledome
July 23, 2009^{[L]}	Costa Mesa	United States	Pacific Amphitheatre
July 24, 2009^{[M]}	Paso Robles	United States	Main Grandstand Arena
July 26, 2009	Kelseyville	United States	Konocti Field Amphitheater
July 29, 2009^{[N]}	Columbus	United States	Celeste Center
August 1, 2009^{[O]}	Harrington	United States	Wilmington Trust Grandstand
August 7, 2009^{[P]}	Clearfield	United States	Clearfield County Fairgrounds
August 10, 2009	Billings	United States	Rimrock Auto Arena
August 14, 2009^{[Q]}	Indianapolis	United States	Hoosier Lottery Grandstand
August 15, 2009^{[R]}	Springfield	United States	Illinois State Fairgrounds Grandstand
August 20, 2009^{[S]}	Louisville	United States	Freedom Hall
August 22, 2009^{[T]}	Des Moines	United States	Iowa State Fair Grandstand
August 27, 2009^{[U]}	Geddes	United States	Mohegan Sun Grandstand
September 3, 2009^{[V]}	Allentown	United States	Allentown Fairgrounds
September 4, 2009^{[W]}	Essex Junction	United States	Coca-Cola Grandstand
September 6, 2009	Thackerville	United States	WinStar Global Event Center
September 11, 2009^{[X]}	York	United States	Toyota Grandstand
September 12, 2009^{[Y]}	Allegan	United States	Allegan County Fairgrounds

Festivals and other miscellaneous performances

^{A} This concert was a part of "Universal Orlando's Mardi Gras"
^{B} This concert was a part of "Last Smash Platinum Bash"
^{C} This concert was a part of the "Grammy Celebration Concert Tour"
^{D} This concert was a part of "Wango Tango"
^{E} This concert was a part of "KDWB's Star Party"
^{F} This concert was a part of "Zootopia"
^{G} This concert was a part of the "Summertime Ball"
^{H} This concert was a part of "UVUphoria"
^{I} This concert was a part of the "B96 Pepsi SummerBash"
^{J} This concert was a part of the "San Diego County Fair"
^{K} This concert was a part of the "Calgary Stampede"
^{L} This concert was a part of the "Orange County Fair"
^{M} This concert was a part of the "California Mid-State Fair"

^{N} This concert was a part of the "Ohio State Fair"
^{O} This concert was a part of the "Delaware State Fair"
^{P} This concert was a part of the "Clearfield County Fair"
^{Q} This concert was a part of the "Indiana State Fair"
^{R} This concert was a part of the "Illinois State Fair"
^{S} This concert was a part of the "Kentucky State Fair"
^{T} This concert was a part of the "Iowa State Fair"
^{U} This concert was a part of the "Great New York State Fair"
^{V} This concert was a part of the "Great Allentown Fair"
^{W} This concert was a part of the "Champlain Valley Exposition"
^{X} This concert was a part of the "York Fair"
^{Y} This concert was a part of the "Allegan County Fair"

Cancellations and rescheduled shows

August 30, 2009	Falcon Heights, Minnesota	Minnesota State Fairgrounds	Cancelled. This concert was a part of the "Minnesota State Fair".

==== Box office score data ====
Venue	City	Tickets sold / Available	Gross revenue
Allentown Fairgrounds	Allentown	5,141 / 10,537 (49%)	$221,078

== Award shows ==
List of performances at award shows, with the location and performed songs
Date	Event	Venue	Location	Performed song(s)	Ref.
August 2, 2003	2003 Teen Choice Awards	Universal Amphitheater	Universal City, California, U.S.	"Low"	
September 3, 2003	4th Annual Latin Grammy Awards	American Airlines Arena	Miami Florida, U.S.	"Ámame (Love Me)" (with Alexandre Pires)	
August 28, 2005	2005 MTV Video Music Awards	American Airlines Arena	Miami, Florida, U.S.	"Since U Been Gone"	
February 8, 2006	48th Annual Grammy Awards	Staples Center	Los Angeles, California, U.S.	"Because of You"	
May 23, 2006	41st Academy of Country Music Awards	MGM Grand Garden Arena	Paradise, Nevada, U.S.	"What Hurts the Most" (with Rascal Flatts)	
May 15, 2007	42nd Academy of Country Music Awards	MGM Grand Garden Arena	Paradise, Nevada, U.S.	"Because of You" (with Reba McEntire)	
August 26, 2007	2007 Teen Choice Awards	Universal Amphitheater	Universal City, California, U.S.	"Never Again"	
June 21, 2009	2009 MuchMusic Video Awards	299 Queen Street West	Toronto, Ontario, Canada	"My Life Would Suck Without You"	
November 22, 2009	American Music Awards of 2009	Nokia Theater	Los Angeles, California, U.S.	"Already Gone"	
November 10, 2010	2010 Country Music Association Awards	Bridgestone Arena	Nashville, Tennessee, U.S.	"Don't You Wanna Stay" (with Jason Aldean)	
February 12, 2012	54th Annual Grammy Awards	Staples Center	Los Angeles, California, U.S.	"Don't You Wanna Stay" (with Jason Aldean)	
May 20, 2012	2012 Billboard Music Awards	MGM Grand Garden Arena	Paradise, Nevada, U.S.	"Dark Side"	
November 1, 2012	2012 Country Music Association Awards	Bridgestone Arena	Nashville Tennessee, U.S.	"Don't Rush" (with Vince Gill)	
November 18, 2012	American Music Awards of 2012	Nokia Theater	Los Angeles, California, U.S.	"Miss Independent", "Since U Been Gone", "Stronger (What Doesn't Kill You)", "Catch My Breath"	
February 10, 2013	55th Annual Grammy Awards	Staples Center	Los Angeles, California, U.S.	"Tennessee Waltz", "(You Make Me Feel Like) A Natural Woman"	
May 17, 2015	2015 Billboard Music Awards	MGM Grand Garden Arena	Paradise, Nevada, U.S.	"Invincible"	
November 19, 2017	American Music Awards of 2017	Microsoft Theater	Los Angeles, California, U.S.	"Everybody Hurts" (with Pink)	
May 20, 2018	2018 Billboard Music Awards	MGM Grand Garden Arena	Paradise, Nevada, U.S.	"My Church", "Too Good at Goodbyes", "Humble", "Thunder", "Young Dumb & Broke", "Finesse", "Shape of You", "There's Nothing Holdin' Me Back", "Look What You Made Me Do"	
June 6, 2018	2018 CMT Music Awards	Bridgestone Arena	Nashville, Tennessee, U.S.	"American Woman"	
May 1, 2019	2019 Billboard Music Awards	MGM Grand Garden Arena	Paradise, Nevada, U.S.	"Meant to Be", "Eastside", "Boo'd Up", "Girls Like You", "The Middle", "One Kiss", "I Like It", "Love Lies", "High Hopes", "Tequila", "Material Girl", "Touch My Body", "Wow"	
October 14, 2020	2020 Billboard Music Awards	Dolby Theatre	Los Angeles, California, U.S.	"Higher Love" (with Pentatonix and Ed Sheeran)	
March 20, 2022	57th Academy of Country Music Awards	Allegiant Stadium	Paradise, Nevada, U.S.	"I Will Always Love You"	
November 9, 2022	56th Annual Country Music Association Awards	Bridgestone Arena	Nashville Tennessee, U.S.	"You're Drunk, Go Home" (with Kelsea Ballerini and Carly Pearce)	

== See also ==
List of Kelly Clarkson concert tours
