= All I Ever Wanted Tour =

2009–10 concert tour by Kelly Clarkson

- Tour by Kelly Clarkson
- Promotional poster for her Quezon City show
- Associated album: All I Ever Wanted
- Start date: October 2, 2009
- End date: May 8, 2010
- Legs: 5
- No. of shows: 31 in North America; 16 in Europe; 3 in Africa; 6 in Oceania; 7 in Asia; 63 total

Kelly Clarkson concert chronology
- All I Ever Wanted Summer Fair Tour (2009); All I Ever Wanted Tour (2009–10); Stronger Tour (2012)

The All I Ever Wanted Tour was the fifth headlining concert tour by American pop rock recording artist Kelly Clarkson in support of her fourth studio album, All I Ever Wanted (2009). It began on October 2, 2009, in Uncasville, Connecticut and finished on May 8, 2010, in Macau. The tour visited North America, Europe, Africa, Oceania, and Asia.

== Background ==
The tour was announced in July 2009, in the middle of Clarkson's summer fair tour. The Auckland show was announced in November 2009. This tour marked the first time Clarkson toured Africa, Asia, and New Zealand.

== Show synopsis ==
Clarkson began and ended each show with "All I Ever Wanted" and "My Life Would Suck Without You". The setlist was filled with past hits, tracks from her fourth album, All I Ever Wanted, and covers. One of the covers was a mashup of Alanis Morissette's "That I Would Be Good" and Kings of Leon's "Use Somebody". The setlist was changed up a bit starting with the Oceania shows. Clarkson was backed by her twelve-piece band.

== Critical reception ==
MTV's Jim Cantiello was at the New York City show and said, "Kelly Clarkson brings everyone together: the young, the old, the gay, the straight, the hipsters, the teenyboppers, the Glamberts, the Allen Nation." He also praised her vocal talent saying, "which she used to great effect in her expansive set." Gene Stout attended the Seattle show and said, "the former "American Idol" proved indispensable in keeping me and thousands of her fans entertained with an onslaught of such past hits" and that she "performed with a surprisingly effective blend of polish and grit." Keith Fairbank of South Wales Argus, said of the Cardiff show, "There's a live band and some strobe lights – but that's it. No elaborate staging, no flying from wires, no dancers. Not even a costume change. Kelly lets her music rule the show and gave the crowd all they ever wanted." He also said that her voice was "fantastic." Tracey Bond of Stuff who attended the Auckland show said, "From the moment Clarkson skipped out on stage, barefoot, to the opening bars of All I Ever Wanted, she gave the crowd at Vector 110 percent. On every song she demonstrated the powerful voice which helped her to win the first season of American Idol."

== Opening acts ==
- Parachute (North America, Europe)
- Jason Hartman (Africa)
- Eric Hutchinson (North America, Australia)
- Some & Any (Germany)
- Cassie Davis (Australia)
- Suki Low – (Kuala Lumpur)
- Jaclyn Victor – (Kuala Lumpur)
- Miguel Escueta – (Quezon City)
- RubberBand (Macau)

== Setlist ==
Set I

October 2, 2009 – March 17, 2010

1. "All I Ever Wanted"
2. "Miss Independent"
3. "I Do Not Hook Up"
4. "Impossible"
5. Mash up: "That I Would Be Good" / "Use Somebody" (Alanis Morissette/Kings of Leon covers)
6. "Breakaway"
7. "If I Can't Have You"
8. "Never Again"
9. "Lies" (The Black Keys cover)
10. "Walkin' After Midnight"
11. "Behind These Hazel Eyes"
12. "Cry"
13. "I Want You"
14. "Rock with You" (Michael Jackson cover)
15. "Ready"
16. "Because of You"
17. "Walk Away"
18. "Since U Been Gone"
19. "Already Gone"

Encore

20. "Sober"
21. "7 Nation Army" (The White Stripes cover)
22. "My Life Would Suck Without You"

Notes

- "Sober" was not performed in Uncasville, Portland, New York City, Fairfax, Atlantic City, Boston, Orillia, Youngstown, Pikeville, Knoxville, Milwaukee, Detroit, Rosemont and New Orleans.
- "Ready" was not performed in Lubbock, Calgary, Las Vegas, Reno, San Jose, Fresno, Las Cruces, Beaumont, Corpus Christi, Columbus, Pensacola and New Orleans
- "Rock with You" was performed as a duet with Eric Hutchinson during concerts in San Jose, Fresno, Las Cruces, Corpus Christi, Columbus and New Orleans.
- "Maybe" was performed in Fresno, Neu-Isenburg and Hamburg.
- During the concert in Detroit, Clarkson performed "Chivas".
- During the concert in New Orleans, Clarkson performed "I'll Be Home for Christmas" and "I Never Loved a Man (The Way I Love You)".
- "Save You" was performed during shows in Europe and South Africa.
- "Rock with You" was not performed during shows in Europe and South Africa.
- "The Promise" was performed during shows in Europe.
- "Don't Let Me Stop You" was performed in lieu of "Rock with You" during concerts in the United Kingdom.
- During the concert in Birmingham, Clarkson performed "How I Feel". The song was also included during the concert in Hamburg.
- During the concert in Neu-Isenburg, Clarkson performed "Maybe" in lieu of "Sober". This also occurred during the concert in Hamburg.
- "Long Shot" was performed in lieu of "7 Nation Army" during concerts in South Africa.
- Walking After Midnight was not performed during the concerts in Durban and Cape Town.
- During the concert in Johannesburg, Clarkson performed "Home".
Set II

April 11, 2010 – May 8, 2010

1. "All I Ever Wanted"
2. "Miss Independent"
3. "I Do Not Hook Up"
4. "Impossible"
5. "Mashup: That I Would Be Good" / "Use Somebody" (Alanis Morissette/Kings of Leon covers)
6. "Breakaway"
7. "If I Can't Have You (contains excerpts from "Can't Get You Out of My Head")
8. "Never Again"
9. "Lies" (The Black Keys cover)
10. "Medley: "Just Missed the Train" / "Low" / "Addicted" / "Gone"
11. "Behind These Hazel Eyes"
12. "Cry"
13. "Save You"
14. "I Want You"
15. "Don't Let Me Stop You"
16. "Because of You"
17. "Walk Away"
18. "Since U Been Gone"
19. "Already Gone"

Encore

19. "Seven Nation Army" (The White Stripes cover)
20. "My Life Would Suck Without You"

Notes

- Keith Urban's "Tonight I Wanna Cry" was performed during concerts in Oceania.
- "Don't Let Me Stop You" and the medley were not performed during concerts in Auckland and Brisbane.
- "Cry" was not performed during concerts in Newcastle, Sydney, Melbourne, Perth, Kuala Lumpur, Kallang, Jakarta and Cotai.
- "Save You" was not performed during concerts in Quezon City, Seoul, Taipei and Cotai.
- During the concert in Auckland, Clarkson performed "Ready". This also occurred during the concert at the Brisbane Entertainment Centre in Brisbane.
- During the concert in the Brisbane, Clarkson performed "Sober". The song was also performed in Quezon City, Seoul, Taipei and Cotai.
- During the concert in Perth, Clarkson performed, "Maybe".

== Tour dates ==
Date	City	Country	Venue
North America
October 2, 2009	Uncasville	United States	Mohegan Sun Arena
October 4, 2009	Portland	United States	Cumberland County Civic Center
October 6, 2009	New York City	United States	Hammerstein Ballroom
October 9, 2009	Fairfax	United States	Patriot Center
October 10, 2009	Atlantic City	United States	Etess Arena
October 13, 2009	Boston	United States	Agganis Arena
October 15, 2009	Orillia	Canada	Casino Rama Entertainment Centre
October 17, 2009	Youngstown	United States	Covelli Centre
October 19, 2009	Pikeville	United States	Eastern Kentucky Expo Center
October 21, 2009	Knoxville	United States	Memorial Civic Coliseum
October 23, 2009	Milwaukee	United States	Milwaukee Theatre
October 25, 2009	Detroit	United States	Fox Theatre
October 27, 2009	Rosemont	United States	Rosemont Theatre
October 29, 2009	Lincoln	United States	Pershing Center
October 31, 2009	St. Charles	United States	Family Arena
November 2, 2009	Cedar Park	United States	Cedar Park Center
November 4, 2009	Lubbock	United States	United Spirit Arena
November 6, 2009	Las Vegas	United States	The Joint
November 7, 2009^{[A]}	Phoenix	United States	Arizona Veterans Memorial Coliseum
November 18, 2009	Victoria	Canada	Save-On-Foods Memorial Centre
November 20, 2009	Calgary	Canada	Pengrowth Saddledome
November 24, 2009	Seattle	United States	WaMu Theater
November 28, 2009	Reno	United States	Reno Events Center
November 29, 2009	San Jose	United States	Event Center Arena
December 1, 2009	Fresno	United States	Save Mart Center
December 3, 2009	Las Cruces	United States	Pan American Center
December 5, 2009	Beaumont	United States	Ford Park Arena
December 7, 2009	Corpus Christi	United States	American Bank Center
December 10, 2009	Columbus	United States	Columbus Civic Center
December 11, 2009	Pensacola	United States	Pensacola Civic Center
December 13, 2009	New Orleans	United States	Lakefront Arena
Europe
February 5, 2010	Dublin	Ireland	Olympia Theatre
February 7, 2010	Manchester	England	Carling Apollo Manchester
February 9, 2010	Liverpool	England	Echo Arena
February 11, 2010	Glasgow	Scotland	O_{2} Academy Glasgow
February 13, 2010	Birmingham	England	O_{2} Academy Birmingham
February 15, 2010	Bournemouth	England	Windsor Hall
February 17, 2010	Cardiff	Wales	Cardiff International Arena
February 19, 2010	London	England	Wembley Arena
February 21, 2010	Brussels	Belgium	Ancienne Belgique
February 23, 2010	Cologne	Germany	E-Werk
February 25, 2010	Amsterdam	Netherlands	Heineken Music Hall
February 27, 2010	Munich	Germany	Postpalast München
March 1, 2010	Zürich	Switzerland	Volkshaus
March 3, 2010	Neu-Isenburg	Germany	Hugenottenhalle
March 5, 2010	Hamburg	Germany	Große Freiheit 36
March 7, 2010	Copenhagen	Denmark	Vega Musikkens Hus
Africa
March 12, 2010	Johannesburg	South Africa	Coca-Cola Dome
March 14, 2010	Durban	South Africa	ICC Durban Arena
March 17, 2010	Cape Town	South Africa	Grand Arena
Oceania
April 11, 2010	Auckland	New Zealand	Vector Arena
April 13, 2010	Brisbane	Australia	Brisbane Entertainment Centre
April 15, 2010	Newcastle	Australia	Newcastle Entertainment Centre
April 17, 2010	Sydney	Australia	Acer Arena
April 19, 2010	Melbourne	Australia	Rod Laver Arena
April 22, 2010	Perth	Australia	Challenge Stadium
Asia
April 25, 2010	Kuala Lumpur	Malaysia	Putra Indoor Stadium
April 27, 2010	Singapore		Singapore Indoor Stadium
April 29, 2010	Jakarta	Indonesia	Tennis Indoor Senayan
May 1, 2010	Quezon City	Philippines	Araneta Coliseum
May 4, 2010	Seoul	South Korea	Olympic Gymnastics Arena
May 6, 2010	Taipei	Taiwan	NTU Gymnasium
May 8, 2010	Macau		Cotai Arena

Festivals and other miscellaneous performances
^{A} This concert was a part of the "Arizona State Fair"

Cancelled show

- November 22, 2009: Kelowna, Canada – Prospera Place

== Box office score data ==
Venue	City	Attendance	Gross revenue
Mohegan Sun Arena	Uncasville	6,091 / 7,621 (80%)	$219,975
Agganis Arena	Boston	3,453 / 4,252 (81%)	$182,061
The Joint	Las Vegas	2,307 / 2,746 (84%)	$169,881
Event Center Arena	San Jose	3,032 / 3,630 (83%)	$136,192
Olympia Theatre	Dublin	1,619 / 1,619 (100%)	$92,258
Ancienne Belgique	Brussels	1,344 / 1,850 (73%)	$73,204
Heineken Music Hall	Amsterdam	4,237 / 5,500 (77%)	$211,173
Vega Musikkens Hus	Copenhagen	1,077 / 1,450 (74%)	$68,912
Brisbane Entertainment Centre	Brisbane	3,972 / 4,163 (95%)	$314,758
Newcastle Entertainment Centre	Newcastle	2,308 / 5,146 (45%)	$173,093
Acer Arena	Sydney	6,648 / 6,728 (99%)	$558,608
Rod Laver Arena	Melbourne	5,814 / 5,995 (97%)	$446,593
TOTAL		41,902 / 50,700 (83%)	$2,646,708

== Personnel ==
Band

- Kelly Clarkson – Lead vocals
- Justin Carpenter – Trombone
- Cory Churko – Guitar, violin, backup vocals
- Aben Eubanks – Guitar
- Chris Gregg – Saxophone
- Jason Halbert– Keyboards, musical director
- Miles McPherson – Drums
- Einar Pedersen – Bass, backup vocals
- Jill Pickering – Backup vocalist, guitar
- Kate Rapier – Backup vocalist
- Ric Robbins – DJ
- Leif Shires – Trumpet

Other

- Narvel Blackstock & Starstuck Management – Management
- Brian Butner & NPB Companies, Inc. – Security
- CAA – Booking
- Ashley Donovan – Hair & makeup
- Tricia Farrow – Production assistant
- Flood, Bumstead, McCreedy & McCarthy Inc. – Business Management
- Alan Hornall – Production manager
- Janco Ltd. – Trucking
- Tim Krieg – Tour manager
- Tait Towers – Staging/Set
- Preferred Travel – Travel agency
- Rockit Cargo – Freight
- Jeff Wuerth – Monitor tech

== Controversy ==
The tour faced controversy in 2010 when Clarkson's image was used to promote Indonesian cigarette brand L.A. Lights (produced by Djarum). The ad promoted the local government to protest and ban the singer's concert in Jakarta. After legal deliberation, the company removed Clarkson's likeness in the ads and stepped down as the concert's sponsor. The concert continued as planned.
