= Long Shot (Kelly Clarkson song) =

Song by Kelly Clarkson

from the album All I Ever Wanted
- Released: March 6, 2009
- Studio: Bay 7 Studios (Valley Village); Sparky Dark Studio (Calabasas); Sunset Sound Studios (Hollywood)
- Genre: Pop
- Length: 3:36
- Label: RCA
- Songwriters: Katy Perry; Glen Ballard; Matt Thiessen
- Producer: Howard Benson

"Long Shot" is a song by American singer Kelly Clarkson from her fourth studio album, All I Ever Wanted (2009). It was written by Katy Perry, Glen Ballard, and Matt Thiessen for inclusion on Perry's eventual second studio album, One of the Boys (2008). The song was ultimately left off the album, and Clarkson later recorded it alongside the outtake "I Do Not Hook Up". Clarkson's rendition of the song was produced by Howard Benson. A pop song, it lyrically discusses a couple's willingness to enter a relationship despite its unlikelihood of success.

Music critics praised "Long Shot" as an album highlight and noted the contrast between Perry's original recording and Clarkson's rendition. While it was not released as a single, it received heavy radio airplay in Canada. It reached a peak position of number 33 on the Billboard Canada Hot AC chart. The song was included on the set list of Clarkson's 2009 concert tour, the All I Ever Wanted Tour.

== Background and recording ==
The song was written by Katy Perry, Glen Ballard, and Matt Thiessen as a track for an album by Perry that was supposed to be entitled Fingerprints (2007) which would eventually become One of the Boys (2008). When Perry was dropped from the Def Jam label and the project was scrapped, "Long Shot" and "I Do Not Hook Up" were given to RCA Records for Clarkson to record for her then-upcoming album, All I Ever Wanted. Clarkson's rendition was recorded by Mike Plotnikoff in 2008 at Bay7 Studios, Sparky Dark Studio, and Sunset Sound Studios, all located in Los Angeles County, California.

== Composition ==
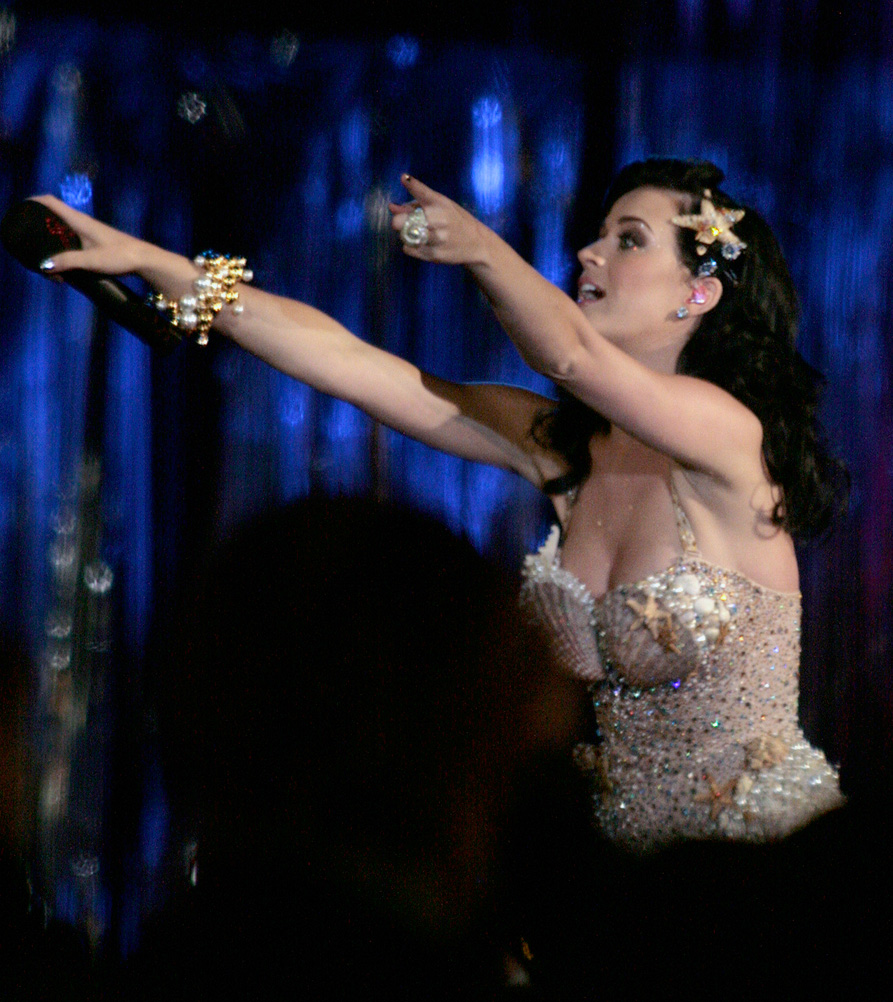
Clarkson's music has been contrasted to that of the song's writer Katy Perry (pictured).

"Long Shot" is a pop song with a duration of three minutes and thirty-six seconds (3:36). According to the digital sheet music published by MusicNotes.com through Alfred Publishing Co., Inc., it is composed in the key of D minor and is set to a moderately fast tempo of 114 BPM. Clarkson's vocal range spans from C_{4}—C_{5}. The song's instrumentation consists of keyboard, drums, guitar, and bass, which were performed by Howard Benson, Josh Freese, Paul Bushnell, and Phil X, respectively.

The song's lyrics explore the inherent risk of starting or continuing a romantic relationship. Some critics have suggested the song implies a flawed relationship, which Clarkson is fighting to keep together. Elements in the lyrics such as the lines "The chance is we won't make it / But I know if I don't take it there's no chance" deliver a message of perseverance and taking risks to reach your goals.

== Critical reception ==
Stephen Thomas Erlewine of AllMusic praised the song and "I Do Not Hook Up" for "illustrating why [Clarkson]'s a better pop star" than co-writer Katy Perry." Ann Powers of The Los Angeles Times also noted that Clarkson "removes the cartoon mannerisms" characteristic of Perry's songs in her version of "Long Shot". On the other hand, Claire Lobenfeld of Vibe was critical of Clarkson for what he deemed to be her mimicking Perry's "silly and saucy" style. Daniel Brockman of The Boston Phoenix and Evan Sawdey of PopMatters both cited "Long Shot" as a highlight of the album, with the latter describing the song as a "sturdy, memorable pop number" that succeeds at playing it safe in a "fun" way.

== Commercial performance ==
In February 2010, two Hot AC stations in Canada began playing "Long Shot" as a potential radio single, leading it to enter the New and Active category for the week ending March 6, 2010 with 82 plays. The album's fourth official single, "All I Ever Wanted", impacted Hot AC radio on March 6, 2010. "Long Shot" reached a peak airplay position of 33, in May 2010, before "All I Ever Wanted" entered the chart.

== Credits and personnel ==
Credits adapted from the All I Ever Wanted liner notes.

Personnel

- Lead vocals – Kelly Clarkson
- Production, keyboards, programming – Howard Benson
- Assistance (with production) – Graham Hope
- Drums – Josh Freese
- Bass – Paul Bushnell
- Guitar – Phil X
- Production manager – Sam Watters
- Recording – Mike Plotnikoff
- Digital editing – Paul Decarli
- Mixing – Serban Ghenea
- Assistance (with mixing) – Tim Roberts
- Songwriting – Katy Perry, Glen Ballard, Matt Thiessen

== Charts ==
Chart positions for "Long Shot"
Chart (2010)	Peak position
Canada Hot AC (Billboard)	33
