= If I Can't Have You =

If I Can't Have You may refer to:

- "If I Can't Have You" (Bee Gees song), 1977, also recorded by Yvonne Elliman
- "If I Can't Have You" (Kelly Clarkson song), 2009
- "If I Can't Have You" (Shawn Mendes song), 2019
- "If I Can't Have You", by Sara Bareilles from the album Amidst the Chaos, 2019
- "If I Can't Have You", by Kylie and Garibay from the EP Kylie and Garibay, 2015
- "If I Can't Have You", by Whitesnake from the album Flesh & Blood, 2019

== See also ==
- "If I Ain't Got You", by Alicia Keys, 2003
