= Save You (Kelly Clarkson song) =

Song performed by Kelly Clarkson

Song by Kelly Clarkson

from the album All I Ever Wanted
- Recorded: 2008
- Studio: Henson Recording, Los Angeles; Mansfield, Los Angeles; Ocean Way, Nashville; Blackbird, Nashville
- Genre: Rock
- Length: 4:03
- Label: RCA
- Songwriters: Ryan Tedder, Aimée Proal
- Producer: Ryan Tedder

"Save You" is a song by American recording artist Kelly Clarkson, from her fourth studio album, All I Ever Wanted (2009). Written by Ryan Tedder and Aimée Proal, and produced by Tedder, "Save You" is a rock ballad that about a someone's desire to save someone from a self-destructive behaviour. The song, set in the key of E major features an experimental piano bridge based on Wolfgang Amadeus Mozart's works.

"Save You" received mixed to positive reviews by music critics, who were equivocal about its production but complimented its experimental bridge and Clarkson's performance. She has also included the song in the set list of the All I Ever Wanted Tour.

== Background and recording ==
"Save You" was written by Ryan Tedder and Aimée Proal, with Tedder handling its production. A demo of the song was recorded by the rock band Gone 'Til November, whose lead singer is Proal, but after being dropped from Epic Records in 2008, the group disbanded even before recording took place. Development of the song continued when Tedder submitted the demo to Clive Davis, who wanted Kelly Clarkson record it.

== Composition ==
"Save You"
"Save You"'s 28-second experimental bridge is based on various musical works by Wolfgang Amadeus Mozart (pictured on right).

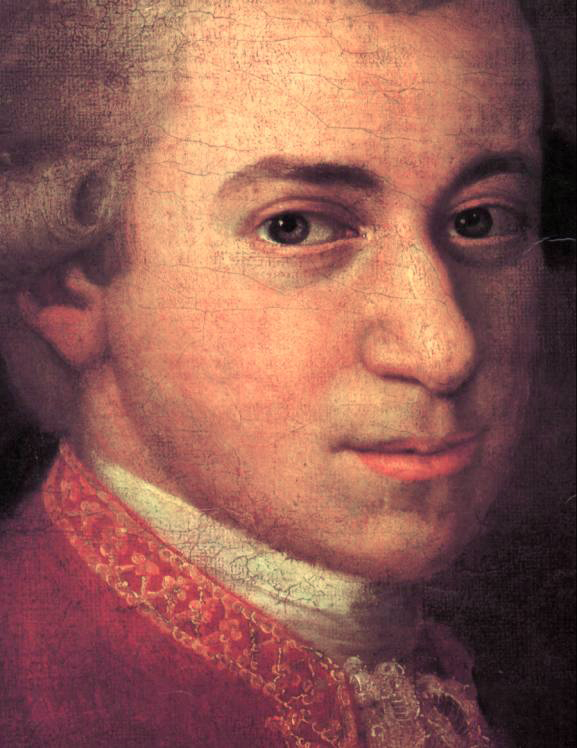
Tedder has always cited western classical music as one of his inspirations, particularly Mozart's (pictured) works.

"Save You" is a midtempo rock ballad. Tedder describes its sound as "orchestral, classical rhythmic". During its bridge, the song interpolates into a piano solo which was based on various works by Wolfgang Amadeus Mozart, whom Tedder often credits as one of his musical inspirations. The instruments used for the song include: an electric Guitar, a piano, and strings, all of which were performed by Tedder. OneRepublic drummer Eddie Fisher performed the drums in the song.

"Save You" is written in the key of E major, Clarkson's vocal range spans from F♯_{3} to E_{5}. Lyrically, the song is about a person's lamentation and desire to save someone from a self-destructive behaviour, similar her 2003 song "Beautiful Disaster". In an interview with The Republican, Proal revealed that she wrote the song for her friend. she said, "She unfortunately lost her mother and I kind of wrote that as an apology because I wasn't around – I was in Los Angeles, I just wanted her to know that I was still thinking about her."

== Critical reception ==
Matt Busekroos of The Quinnipiac Chronicle praised the song as "a beautifully composed ballad with a nod to Mozart, especially near the bridge where a piano solo is prominently featured. The song is pure pop bliss." Debayan Deb of The Hindu praised it as "one of the best engineered tracks as the drums and Kelly Clarkson’s soaring vocals compliment [sic] each other." Larry Rodgers of The Arizona Republic noted that ""Save You" mine the same break-up territory but show added maturity in their delivery by the 26-year-old singer." Leah Greenblatt of Entertainment Weekly described the song as a "soaring, impeccably constructed power ballad."

Jonathan Keefe of Slant Magazine gave a mixed review, he wrote: "The bombastic orchestral arrangement and multi-tracked vocals on "Save You" are overdone, but the strength of Clarkson's dramatic vocal turn still shines through." David Sessions of Patrol Magazine criticized Tedder's production on the song, remarking that he "seems to be intent on bringing his band’s vague, clichéd, synthy rock to girl-pop", which sinks "Save You." and "Already Gone." Brian Linder of IGN gave a mixed review, he wrote, "It's not that the Tedder joints are bad. In fact, they're all perfectly radio-ready tunes. But with the possible exception of "Save You," this synth-heavy stuff is just not what best suits Clarkson's skillset. It makes for a soft midsection of the album that isn't as memorable as the bookends."

== Credits and personnel ==
Credits adapted from the All I Ever Wanted liner notes.

Personnel

- Lead Vocals – Kelly Clarkson
- Production, Programming, Arranging – Ryan Tedder
- Electric Guitar, Piano, Strings – Ryan Tedder
- Drums – Eddie Fisher
- Assistance – Tom Syrowski, Joe Martino, Mike Rooney
- Production Manager – Sam Watters
- Recording – Ryan Tedder, Craig Durrance
- Songwriting – Ryan Tedder, Aimée Proal
