= All I Ever Wanted (album) =

Studio album by Kelly Clarkson
- Released: March 6, 2009
- Recorded: 2008
- Studios: Conway Recording Studios (Los Angeles, CA); Dr. Luke's Studio (Malibu, CA); Bay7 Studios (Valley Village, CA); Sparky Dark Studios (Calabasas, CA); Sunset Sound Studios (Hollywood, CA); Homesite 13 (Novato, CA); Starstruck Studios (Nashville, TN); Chalice Recording Studios (Los Angeles, CA); 4014 Mixing Studios (Los Angeles, CA); Blackbird Studio (Nashville, TN); Henson Recording Studios (Los Angeles, CA); Ocean Way Recording (Nashville, TN); Hong Kong International Airport (Hong Kong); Mansfield Studios (Los Angeles, CA); Ante Up Studios (Cleveland, OH); Chicago Recording Company (Chicago, IL)
- Genres: Pop; pop rock
- Length: 50:28 (standard); 58:49 (deluxe)
- Labels: RCA; 19
- Producers: Howard Benson; Louis Biancaniello; Kelly Clarkson; Dre & Vidal; Dr. Luke; Max Martin; Ryan Tedder; Sam Watters

Kelly Clarkson chronology
My December (2007)	All I Ever Wanted (2009)	Stronger (2011)

Singles from All I Ever Wanted
- 1. "My Life Would Suck Without You" Released: January 13, 2009; 2. "I Do Not Hook Up" Released: March 31, 2009; 3. "Already Gone" Released: August 11, 2009; 4. "All I Ever Wanted" Released: March 9, 2010; 5. "Cry" Released: March 12, 2010

All I Ever Wanted is the fourth studio album by American singer Kelly Clarkson, released on March 6, 2009, by RCA Records. After the controversies that surrounded her previous studio album, My December (2007), which was seen as much darker than her two previous albums, Clarkson went on to record a more pop-oriented album. In order to do so, she worked with previous collaborators Max Martin, Dr. Luke, (with whom she had worked on her 2004 second album, Breakaway), Sam Watters and Louis Biancaniello (with whom she had worked on her 2003 debut album Thankful), and new collaborators, Ryan Tedder, Howard Benson and Dre & Vidal.

Originally entitled Masquerade, its title was changed due to the similarities to those of other albums released at the same time, such as Pink's Funhouse (2008) and Britney Spears's Circus (2008). All I Ever Wanted was considered lighter and less angry than her previous effort, though it also features pop rock and pop punk-inspired songs, as well as dance and soul. Its cartoon-colored artwork was criticized by reviewers and Clarkson herself for using too much Photoshop. All I Ever Wanted mainly deals with themes of romantic relationships, dignity, independence and emotional truthfulness.

The album received generally favorable reviews from most music critics, who praised her approach with mainstream music, without losing her identity and personality. Her vocals were also praised, but a few critics called the album "hackneyed" and "overworked". The album was also a success, debuting at number-one on the US Billboard 200 chart, becoming her second to do so, and peaking inside the top-ten in more than ten countries. It was certified platinum in Australia and Canada, and gold in Ireland and the United Kingdom. The album was nominated for Best Pop Vocal Album at the 52nd Grammy Awards.

Three singles were released from the album worldwide: "My Life Would Suck Without You" was the lead single and became Clarkson's second number-one single on the Billboard Hot 100 and also the biggest leap to number one on the same chart; it also topped the charts of Canada and the United Kingdom. Its second single, "I Do Not Hook Up", fared well, though it was moderate in some countries, while the third, "Already Gone", was more successful but faced controversies due to its similarity to Beyoncé's "Halo"; both co-written and produced by Tedder. The album's title track was released as a radio single only in the U.S., while "Cry" was released only in selected territories. To promote the album, Clarkson embarked on the All I Ever Wanted Summer Fair Tour and the All I Ever Wanted Tour, between 2009 and 2010.

== Background and recording ==
After her successful second studio album, Breakaway (2004), which gave her two Grammy Awards as well as other awards, four successful singles and over ten million copies sold, Clarkson felt pressure from her label to duplicate the album's success while recording her third studio album, My December (2007). The album was marked by many conflicts with her label, RCA Records, and the head of Sony Music, Clive Davis, who was dissatisfied with the album's darker tone and asked her to scrap the album in favor of making a more commercial one. Clarkson declined to do it and the album's date was pushed back several times. Eventually, My December was released amidst the controversies, and while receiving generally favorable reviews from music critics and debuting on the Billboard 200 chart with expressive sales, it only produced one successful single, "Never Again", and its promotion was dubbed "confused" due to its controversies.

After promoting the album with the "My December Tour" (2007–2008), and later embarking on a co-headlining tour with Reba McEntire, Clarkson, who was with a new manager, felt confident again in the studio and started writing a new album. In October 2008, she posted on her blog she had finished the album and was very excited about it. Clarkson also told the same month, she was working with a new collaborator, Ryan Tedder, claiming that the recording sessions with him "went really well". She also explained that Clive Davis introduced them to each other in a label meeting, and later they ended up writing five or six songs. Tedder explained to Digital Spy that the songs featured "big choruses" and "heavy drum programming" and were influenced by nineties electro-rockers Garbage. She also worked for the first time with Howard Benson, claiming she was a big fan of him and his production with many artists such as Daughtry, stating that she loved the way he produced and how he captured how she sounds live.

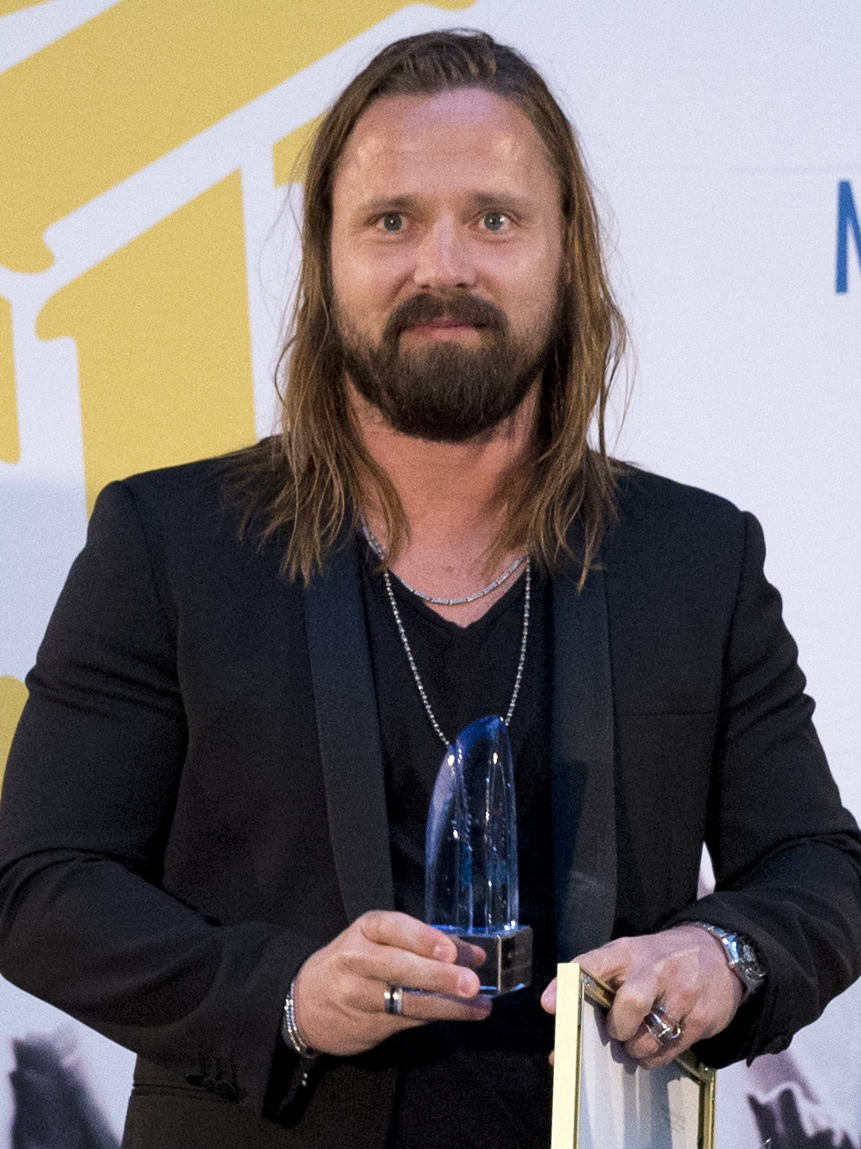
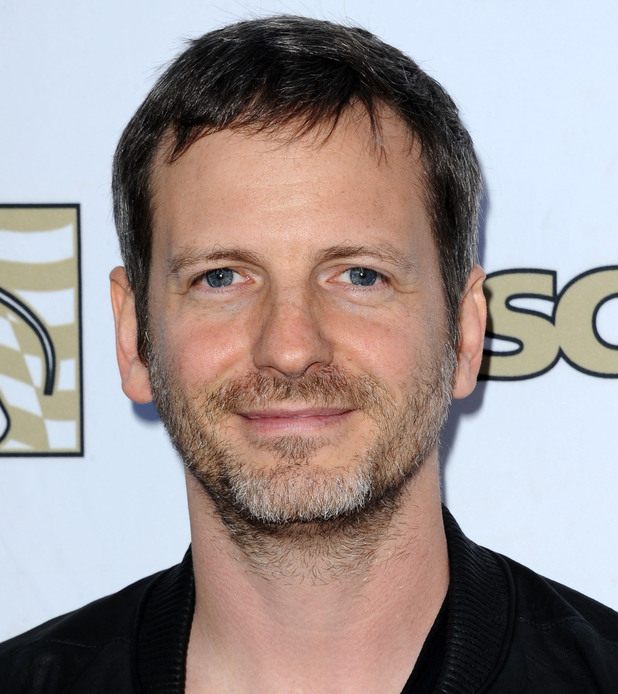
Max Martin (left) and Dr. Luke (right) collaborated with Clarkson again after the success of "Since U Been Gone".

Clarkson also worked with previous producers, such as Sam Watters and Louis Biancaniello, whom produced the song "Anytime" on her debut album, Thankful (2003), as well as Max Martin and Dr. Luke, the producers behind Clarkson's signature song "Since U Been Gone" and "Behind These Hazel Eyes" on Breakaway (2004). Dr. Luke was interviewed by Entertainment Weekly and said: "After "Since U Been Gone", we wrote all these songs for Kelly. This one, ["My Life Would Suck Without You"], which I think is the first single — we had the chorus a while ago and added the verse more recently." He further added: "She sings a song in two hours and kills it. You're just like, 'Holy sh–.' She has powerful lungs. She's like the Lance Armstrong of vocal cords." She also worked again with songwriter Kara DioGuardi, who co-wrote several tracks on Breakaway, and received two songs co-written by Katy Perry. Perry claimed she worked on her debut album for five years and recorded so many songs for it that both songs didn't make it to the album, then Clarkson heard them, liked them, and recorded them.

== Music ==
=== Production and sound ===
"The album is very personal and all over the place. All my albums always have been. I don't know about you, but I get really pissed off when I buy an album and every song's the same. [...] Some artists complain about leaking a bit of the album with each song. I'm like, 'That's just forcing you to come out with better music'."

— Clarkson about the sound of the album.

All I Ever Wanted is considered a pop and pop rock album, with influences of dance, rock and soul music. Sonically different than her previous album, My December (2007), the album also features pop punk influences that are reminiscent from her third album. James Montgomery of MTV News noted that the album has "unabashed pop, big crunchy guitar chords and tear-tinged ballads," while Evan Sawdey of PopMatters noted that "[t]hough some of the post-breakup bitterness of My December still lingers here, All I Ever Wanted remains a remarkably upbeat record." Maura of Idolator called it a "pop redemption" [...] "a fun collection of pop tracks", with Slant Magazine's Jonathan Keefe dubbing it "Clarkson's version of Now That's What I Call Music! 29." Michael Cragg of MusicOMH summarized the album as a "musical partner" to Clarkson's second album, Breakaway, "in terms of the sound and the sheer commercial appeal."

The first track, "My Life Would Suck Without You", was considered an explicit sequel to "Since U Been Gone", having a mainstream dance/guitar-pop sound, with thumping synths and guitar riffs. "I Do Not Hook Up" was named a "punchy, spunky pop stormer", while "Long Shot" was dubbed a "string-infused rocker"; both songs were originally demos from Katy Perry. "Don't Let Me Stop You" was called an "arena rocker track" and compared to her single "Behind These Hazel Eyes", due to the use of the same chord progression. Clarkson defined "If I Can't Have You", a dance and synthpop song, as "very like Eurythmics meets The Killers" in a sexy vibe, while "I Want You" was labeled a "pure pop", "girl group" song, with vocal stutters, fluid harps, and a dry kick-drum beat. The album's title track and "Whyyawannabringmedown" are two covers from the band Aranda's debut album; the first was considered a soul-rock-funk song, with its disco bass heavily compared to Spoon's song "I Turn My Camera On", while the latter was named a "bubblegum punk" song.

The power ballad "Save You" was written by Aimée Proal with Ryan Tedder for her now-disbanded group Gone 'Til November, who recorded its demo and Tedder pitched the song to Clarkson's label. It features an experimental bridge that was inspired by Mozart. "If No One Will Listen" is a cover of Keri Noble's song from her debut album Fearless, "Cry" was defined by Clarkson as a "waltz" ballad influenced by country music, and "Already Gone" was considered a "kick drum-driven" ballad and it was largely compared to Beyoncé's "Halo"; both produced by Tedder. "Impossible" was called a "piano-riddled rocker", while "Ready" was named a "breezy, carefree pop" song.

=== Lyrical content ===
Lyrically, All I Ever Wanted talks generally about romantic relationships— the good, the bad and the dysfunctional —with Clarkson defining it as "pretty personal". Ann Powers of Los Angeles Times noted that the album "provides her faithful female fans with a solid group of anthems and introspective moments expressing dignity, independence and emotional truthfulness." "My Life Would Suck Without You" "describes two people who've committed to each other even though their relationship has some rough edges", while "I Do Not Hook Up" has Clarkson informing "would-be suitors that [she]'s looking for a lasting commitment, not a casual fling." "Cry" talks about betrayal, with the singer writing about a friendship that went wrong, while wondering, "Is it over yet? Can I open my eyes?," meanwhile "Don't Let Me Stop You" has Clarkson "demonstrat[ing] self-respect and emotional resiliency even when things aren't working out." "All I Ever Wanted" deals with "Clarkson's conflicted feelings", while "Already Gone" is about coming to terms with a relationship that was destined for failure. "If I Can't Have You" playfully talks about Clarkson finding what she's looking for, while "Save You" is about a person's lamentation and desire to save someone from a self-destructive behaviour after a loss. "Whyyawannabringmedown" finds Clarkson singing, "I'm not your love monkey, so be takin' back all of the lies you sold," "Long Shot" "acknowledges the risk involved with a new romantic endeavor", and with "Impossible" she admits: "I will stumble and I'll make my own mistakes, yeah/But I won't worry 'bout it anymore." "I Want You" finds the singer "swooning over a hot-tempered, noncommunicative guy," who is "such a mess with an attitude," and "If No One Will Listen" ends with Clarkson "encouraging a struggling friend, [herself or anyone else], to relinquish pent-up fears."

== Title and artwork ==
On January 2, 2009, The Wall Street Journal published an article about the upcoming albums of 2009, and Clarkson's fourth studio album was among them. At the time, RCA general manager Tom Corson claimed she was "in a period where she wants to take on the pop world again." [...] "She's ready, and she's got all the right support." The newspaper also revealed its working title, Masquerade. However, Clarkson changed it to All I Ever Wanted, since she felt the title was too similar to other pop albums released near the time of her album, such as Britney Spears' Circus (2008) and P!nk's Funhouse (2008). Its cartoon-colored, airbrushed cover art was revealed on January 9, 2009. As Rolling Stone's Daniel Kreps described, "the cover depicts a shiny, happy Clarkson, one ready to step out of the shadows of the brooding My December and reclaim her pop throne." Kreps opined that the cover resembles another "comeback album"—Spears's Circus. The cover faced some controversy due to the heavy usage of Photoshop. Clarkson herself commented, "We decided the cover of the album and just in case you haven't seen it I'll post it! It's very colorful and they have definitely Photoshopped the crap out of me—but I don't care, haha! Whoever she is, she looks great, ha!."

== Singles ==
The album's first single, "My Life Would Suck Without You", had its artwork revealed on January 5, 2009, and it shows "Clarkson sporting a wide-eyed [...] look and a heart-shaped lollipop." It was released to airplay on January 13, 2009, and three days later was made available for digital download. On January 28, 2009, Billboard announced that the single went from number 97 to number one on the Billboard Hot 100, making the biggest leap to the top in the chart's history, as well as marking Clarkson's second US number-one single, and her first in seven years. Elsewhere, it was a chart success, also reaching the top of the Canadian and UK charts, and the top 10 in over ten countries. Its music video leaked on January 28, 2009, and it shows Clarkson and her boyfriend having a dysfunctional relationship.

"I Do Not Hook Up" was released to Russian radio on March 31, 2009, as the second single off the album. The cover art for the single was released on March 26, 2009. The music video for the song, directed by Bryan Barber, was shot in March 2009 and released on April 20, 2009, on MTV. As described by Clarkson, the video is about "how the girl is a good girl, she doesn't hook up. But inside her head, every time she turns around, she's fantasizing. So she's hooking up in her fantasies, but never in real life." The song was a moderate success on the charts, reaching number nine in Australia, the top 20 in Canada and the US, and the top 40 in other six countries.

"Already Gone" was sent to US radio on August 11, 2009, as the album's third single. The single's artwork was released on July 8, 2009. The song faced controversy due to its similarity to another Ryan Tedder-produced track, Beyoncé's "Halo", with Clarkson going as far as trying to prevent the single's release, but her label chose to release it anyway. In the United States, the song was more successful than "I Do Not Hook Up", reaching number 13 on the Billboard Hot 100 and spending eight consecutive weeks at number one on the Billboard Adult Pop Songs chart. Elsewhere, it reached the top twenty in four countries, and the top forty in another four countries. The music video was directed by Joseph Kahn and released on July 27, 2009. Kahn was dissatisfied with the result of the video, which shows Clarkson "singing in various luxurious locations while violins play themselves."

The album's title track, "All I Ever Wanted", was released as the fourth and final single in the United States. It was officially sent to US radio on March 9, 2010, and to the US and Canadian iTunes Store for download on March 15, 2010. It only peaked at number 96 on the Billboard Hot 100 chart, while being more successful on the Adult Pop Songs sub-chart, where it reached number 11. Meanwhile, "Cry" was released as the fourth single in Germany and Australia and as the fifth single overall. It was released as a digital download in Germany on March 12, 2010 and sent to Australian radio on March 15, 2010. It became the second most added song to radio in Australia the week it was sent for airplay. The song was also covered by Lea Michele in the Glee episode "Choke" on May 1, 2012.

== Promotion ==
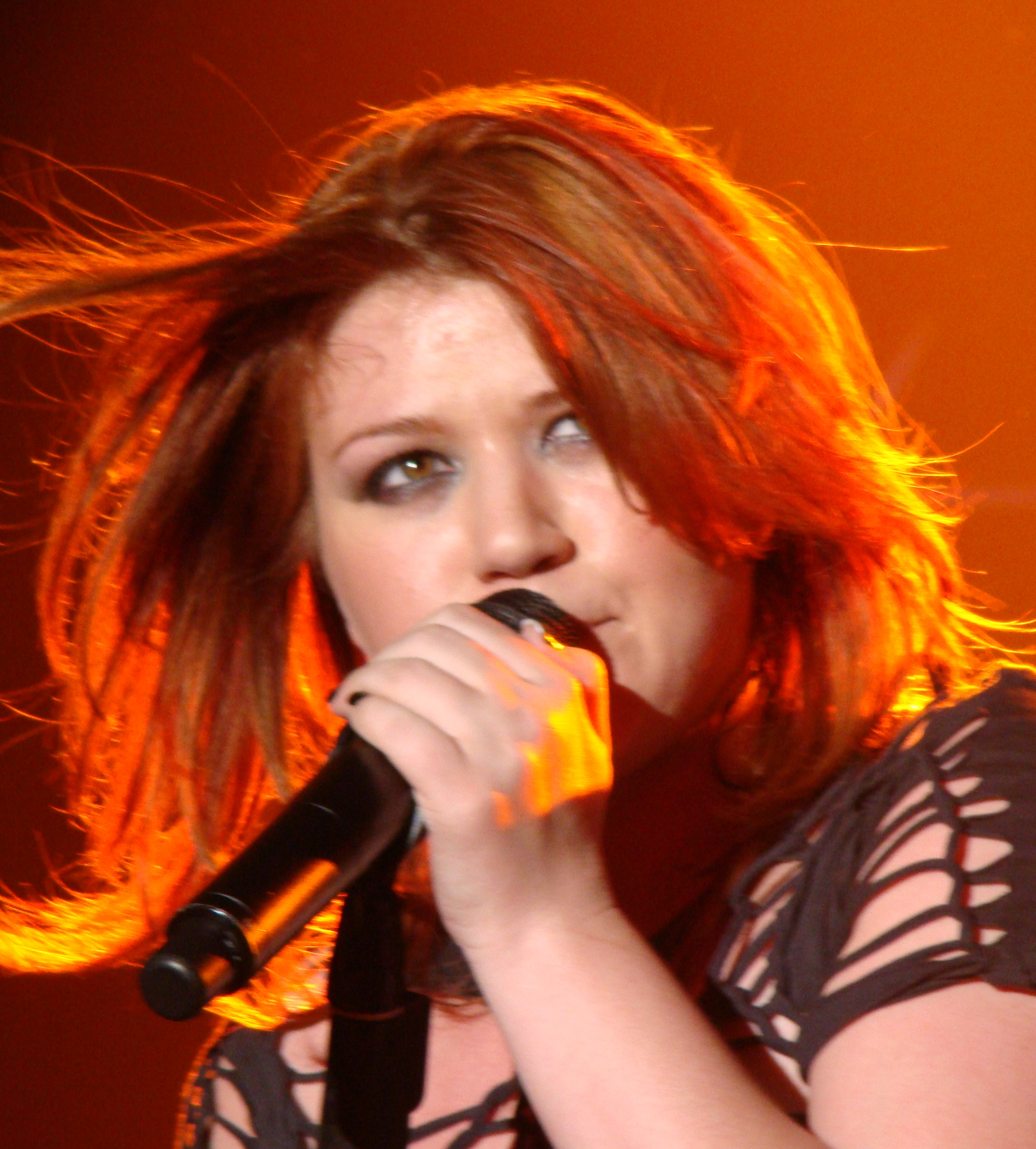
Clarkson performing as part of her All I Ever Wanted Tour.

To promote the album, Clarkson performed "My Life Would Suck Without You" and "I Do Not Hook Up" on Good Morning America on the US album's launch date, March 10, 2009. The singer performed the album's first single "My Life Would Suck Without You" on the eighth season of American Idol on March 11, 2009. Clarkson also performed "My Life Would Suck Without You" and the album's second single "I Do Not Hook Up" on the 34th season of Saturday Night Live on March 14, 2009. The singer also promoted the album on Walmart Soundcheck on March 18, 2009, performing "My Life Would Suck Without You" and "I Do Not Hook Up", as well as her older hits "Since U Been Gone", "Because of You" and "Walk Away". On March 20, 2009, she also appeared on The Oprah Winfrey Show to give an interview and perform a medley of "Because of You", "Behind These Hazel Eyes" and "My Life Would Suck Without You". Clarkson was also on So You Think You Can Dance to perform "I Do Not Hook Up", on the David Letterman Show, The View the American Music Awards of 2009 to perform "Already Gone", as well as on VH1 Divas to also perform "Already Gone" and "Bring Me Some Water" with Melissa Etheridge. She also promoted the album with live performances on The Ellen DeGeneres Show, Live with Regis & Kelly and The Tonight Show with Jay Leno. She also gave interviews and appeared on many magazines, such as the Rolling Stone issue of April 30, 2009, Teen Vogue, Newsweek, and on the cover of Blender and Self magazines. "My Life Would Suck Without You", "Already Gone", "Don't Let Me Stop You" and "If I Can't Have You" were also featured on the TV series The Hills.

=== Tours ===
All I Ever Wanted Summer Fair Mini-Tour

A 23 date mini-tour to promote the album, with all dates being at state fairs around the United States.

All I Ever Wanted Tour

A world tour covering North America, Europe, Asia, Oceania, and South Africa.

== Critical reception ==
Professional ratings
Aggregate scores
Source	Rating
Metacritic	70/100
Review scores
Source	Rating
AllMusic	3.5/5 stars
The A.V. Club	C+
Blender	4/5 stars
Entertainment Weekly	B+
Los Angeles Times	3.5/4 stars
musicOMH	2/5 stars
Now	3/5 stars
PopMatters	6/10
Rolling Stone	3/5 stars
Slant Magazine	3/5 stars

All I Ever Wanted received positive reviews from critics. At Metacritic, which assigns a normalized rating out of 100 to reviews from mainstream critics, the album received a score of 70, indicating "generally favorable reviews". Ann Powers of Los Angeles Times called it "a masterful rapprochement with the mainstream, full of cheerfully ear-snagging tunes, inventive production, exhilarating vocals and enough inherent Kelly-ness to put aside fears that her label bosses implanted blond electrodes in her brain to make her behave." Kerri Mason of Billboard praised the album for " show[ing] a lighter-hearted, but more vocally mature Clarkson than her last outing" and Clarkson for "becoming a masterful interpreter too." Sarah Rodman of The Boston Globe observed that the singer is "learning to strike the age-old pop music balance that her hired hands perfected in the past, [...] expressing emotional truth while crafting something that sounds good on the radio." Jon Dolan of Blender gave praise to Clarkson for "mak[ing] nice with the pop machine and tak[ing] back the mall while keeping her integrity and personality intact," while J. Freedom du Lac of The Washington Post called it "one of those rare pop albums that should resonate with the mainstream while also generating critical heat." Hugh Montgomery of The Observer opined that "on its own limited terms, it's a job well done." While calling her first album "the Obligation", her second "the Breakthrough", and her third "the Reaction," Jon Caramanica of The New York Times noted that All I Ever Wanted "plays out as Ms. Clarkson's Concession," pointing out that "Ms. Clarkson's identity is finally firm: spurned, hurt and torn."

Stephen Thomas Erlewine of AllMusic recognized that she "sounds impassioned and invested in these numbers, selling every one of the skyscraper hooks, but better still she sounds relatable, pulling listeners into a song instead of keeping them at a distance," observing that "while it's not perfect, largely due to those dreary Tedder tunes, much of All I Ever Wanted does justice to Clarkson's considerable skills." Elle J Small of BBC Music declared that the album "won't disappoint hardcore fans but is unlikely to garner new listeners," a sentiment echoed by Vibe's Claire Lobenfeld, who wrote that it "will be a hit with Clarkson die-hards, but is unlikely to influence any Top 40 outsiders." Evan Sawdey of PopMatters noticed that "[t]hough All I Ever Wanted is not a classic pop album by any means, it's most assuredly a fun one—flaws and all. It might be a bit quirky at times, but therein lies the charm: no one could've filled up such a deliberately commercial album with so much personality aside from Kelly Clarkson, and for that, we should all be a bit thankful." In a more mixed review, Jody Rosen of Rolling Stone admitted that "Clarkson's sense of grievance, inflated to gargantuan size by her huge voice, can be wearying over 14 songs, particularly when the music sags." Michaelangelo Matos of The A.V. Club called it "a likeable but ultimately hackneyed album that presents her as the über-everygirl", while Michael Cragg of musicOMH was more critical, writing that "as an album, the whole thing feels precision tooled, vacuum-packed and strangely lifeless." Jonathan Keefe of Slant Magazine analyzed the album in his review, declaring:

"Taken in isolation and out of the context of the album as a whole—say, on the radio—nearly all of these songs work well enough, despite the production choices that don't always play to Clarkson's strengths and which draw too much attention to themselves. And if all Clarkson ever wanted was a major commercial comeback, then this album should undoubtedly give it to her. But whatever her army of producers and legion of co-writers may have brought to the project in terms of radio-ready pop hooks, there's just too much tone and subtext to her performances here—and hell, even consider the record's title—that betrays Clarkson's ironic take on the whole affair."

=== Accolades ===
The album was nominated for Best Pop Vocal Album at the 52nd Grammy Awards. It also entered AllMusic's list of "Favorite Pop Albums of 2009", as well as MTV's "Best Albums Of 2009" at number 12. All I Ever Wanted was also selected by Entertainment Weekly as the "Best Comeback".

Publication	List	Rank
AllMusic	Favorite Pop Albums of 2009	3
Entertainment Weekly	10 Best (and 5 Worst) Albums of 2009	Best Comeback
MTV	Best Albums Of 2009	12
Rolling Stone	Top Albums of the Decade	8

== Commercial performance ==
All I Ever Wanted debuted on the Billboard 200 at number one with sales of 255,000 copies, becoming the second time Clarkson topped the chart; her debut set, Thankful, also began at number one with 297,000 copies sold in its first week in 2003. In its second week, the album remained at the top, with 90,000 copies, whilst in its third week, it fell to number five, selling 52,000 copies. As of September 2017, the album has sold 1,004,000 copies in the United States, becoming her fourth highest-selling album of her career, behind Thankful (2003), Breakaway (2004) and Stronger (2011). In Canada, it debuted at number 2, becoming her highest debut along with her previous album, My December (2007), selling 15,000 copies. In Australia, it also debuted at number two, becoming her highest debut along with Breakaway (2004). It was later certified platinum by the Australian Recording Industry Association for exceeding 70,000 copies. In New Zealand, the album debuted at number six; also her highest since Breakaway.

In the United Kingdom, the album sold 40,000 copies and debuted at number 3 on the UK Albums Chart. As of June 2012, All I Ever Wanted has sold 197,817 copies in the United Kingdom. The album also debuted inside the top ten of the album charts in Austria, Belgium (Flanders), Ireland, the Netherlands, South Africa and Switzerland. In Spain, the album reached number forty, becoming her highest debut of her career, while tying with Stronger years later. Meanwhile, in Sweden, it became her second and last album, so far, to reach the top-twenty, debuting at number fifteen. In contrast, in Finland, the album became her first to miss the top-twenty, though it was her last to chart there.

== Track listing ==
All I Ever Wanted — Standard edition
No.	Title	Writer(s)	Producer(s)	Length
1.	"My Life Would Suck Without You"	Lukasz Gottwald; Claude Kelly; Max Martin	Dr. Luke; Martin	3:32
2.	"I Do Not Hook Up"	Katy Perry; Kara DioGuardi; Greg Wells	Howard Benson	3:20
3.	"Cry"	Kelly Clarkson; Jason Halbert; Mark Lee Townsend	Benson	3:34
4.	"Don't Let Me Stop You"	Claude Kelly; Andreas Romdhane; Josef Larossi	Benson	3:20
5.	"All I Ever Wanted"	Sam Watters; Louis Biancaniello; Dameon Aranda	Biancaniello; Watters	3:59
6.	"Already Gone"	Clarkson; Ryan Tedder	Tedder	4:41
7.	"If I Can't Have You"	Clarkson; Tedder	Tedder; Greg Ogan	3:39
8.	"Save You"	Tedder; Aimée Proal	Tedder	4:03
9.	"Whyyawannabringmedown"	Watters; Biancaniello; Aranda	Biancaniello; Watters	2:42
10.	"Long Shot"	Perry; Glen Ballard; Matt Thiessen	Benson	3:36
11.	"Impossible"	Clarkson; Tedder	Tedder	3:23
12.	"Ready"	Clarkson; Halbert; Aben Eubanks	Benson	3:05
13.	"I Want You"	Clarkson; Joakim Åhlund	Biancaniello; Watters	3:31
14.	"If No One Will Listen"	Keri Noble	Clarkson	4:03
Total length:				50:28

All I Ever Wanted — Japanese, international Amazon MP3 and South Asian digital edition (bonus track)
No.	Title	Writer(s)	Producer(s)	Length
15.	"Can We Go Back"	Adam Watts; Andy Dodd; Shanna Crooks	Benson	2:52
Total length:				53:20

All I Ever Wanted — Deluxe edition (bonus tracks)
No.	Title	Writer(s)	Producer(s)	Length
15.	"Tip of My Tongue"	Clarkson; Tedder	Tedder	4:18
16.	"The Day We Fell Apart"	Watters; Biancaniello; Andre Harris; Vidal Davis; Harry Zelnick; Alexander Chiger	Harris; Davis; Biancaniello; Watters	4:03
Total length:				58:49

All I Ever Wanted — North American iTunes Store pre-order, international digital store and Japanese deluxe edition (bonus track)
No.	Title	Writer(s)	Producer(s)	Length
17.	"Can We Go Back"	Adam Watts; Andy Dodd; Shanna Crooks	Benson	2:52
Total length:				61:09

All I Ever Wanted — Deluxe edition (bonus DVD)
No.	Title	Length
1.	"Making the Video"	7:35
2.	"Making the Album"	6:46
3.	"My Life Would Suck Without You" (music video)	3:33
4.	"Photo Gallery"	3:00
Total length:		20:14

- Clarkson was involved in writing "My Life Would Suck Without You", however, she decided to remain unspecified in the song's credits because she didn't want to be associated with producer Dr. Luke.

== Personnel ==
=== Musicians ===
- Dameon Aranda – guitars (5, 9), bass (9), backing vocals (9)
- Howard Benson – keyboards (2, 3, 4, 10, 12, 17), programming (2, 3, 4, 10, 12, 17)
- Louis Biancaniello – keyboards (5, 9, 13, 16), programming (5, 9, 13, 16), bass (5)
- Michael Biancaniello – guitars (5, 13), bass (13)
- Owen Biddle – guitars (16), bass (16)
- RaVaughn Brown – backing vocals (16)
- Tom Bukovac – guitars (14)
- Kim Bullard – keyboards (12, 17), programming (12, 17)
- Paul Bushnell – bass (2, 3, 4, 10, 12, 17)
- Alexander Chiger – guitars (16), bass (16)
- Kelly Clarkson – all vocals (1–8, 10–15, 17), lead vocals (9, 16)
- Josh Freese – drums (2, 3, 4, 10, 12, 17)
- Eddie Fisher – drums (7, 8)
- Luke Gottwald – programming (1), synthesizers (1), guitars (1), bass (1), drums (1)
- John Jarvis – acoustic piano (14)
- Alain Johannes – additional guitars (7)
- Paul Leim – drums (14)
- Max Martin – synthesizers (1), guitars (1)
- Jamie Muhoberac – keyboards (2, 4)
- Brian Ray – guitars (6, 15)
- Aaron Sterling – drums (11)
- Ryan Tedder – various instruments (6, 7, 15), programming (6, 7, 8, 11, 15), arrangements (6, 7, 8, 11, 15), acoustic piano (8), electric guitars (8, 11), strings (8)
- Glenn Worf – bass (14)
- Phil X – guitars (2, 3, 4, 10, 12, 17)
- Jonathan Yudkin – all strings (14)
- Harry Zelnick – guitars (16), bass (16)

=== Production ===
- Narvel Blackstock – manager
- Pete Ganbarg – A&R
- Erwin Gorostiza – creative director
- Meghan Foley – art direction, design
- Frances Hathaway – make-up
- Claude Kelly – additional vocal production (1)
- Karen Levitt – wardrobe stylist
- Campbell McAuley – hair stylist
- Trisha McClanahan – manager
- Mike Ruiz – photography
- Gary Silver – production coordinator (1)
- Sam Watters – vocal production (5, 9, 13, 16)

=== Technical ===
- Chris Ashburn – recording assistant (14)
- Derek Bason – recording (14)
- Howard Benson – recording (12, 17)
- Louis Biancaniello – recording (5, 9, 13, 16)
- Kim Bullard – recording (12, 17)
- Paul Decarli – digital editing (2, 3, 4, 10, 12, 17)
- Craig Durrance – recording (7, 8), recording assistant (15)
- Jimmy Frysinger – recording assistant (11)
- Serban Ghenea – mixing
- Chris Gehringer – mastering
- Gary Gershunoff – drum technician
- Anelia Gottwald – vocal editing assistant (1)
- John Hanes – additional Pro Tools engineer
- Simon Heeger – recording assistant (15)
- Sam Holland – engineer (1)
- Graham Hope – recording assistant (2, 3, 4, 10, 12, 17)
- Hatsukazu "Hatch" Inagaki – additional engineer (2, 3, 4, 10, 12, 17)
- Koolkojak – vocal editing assistant (1)
- Joe Martino – recording assistant (7, 8)
- Jared Newcomb – recording assistant (6, 15)
- Dan Piscina – recording assistant (11, 15)
- Mike Plotnikoff – recording (2, 3, 4, 10)
- Dave Reiley – recording (11)
- Tim Roberts – assistant engineer
- Mike Rooney – recording assistant (7, 8)
- Tom Syrowski – recording assistant (7, 8, 15)
- Ryan Tedder – recording (6, 7, 8, 11)
- Mark Vangool – guitar technician
- Seth Waldmann – recording assistant (15)
- Sam Watters – recording (5, 9, 13, 16)
- Emily Wright – engineer (1), vocal editing (1)
- Joe Zook – recording (6, 11, 15)

== Charts ==
=== Weekly charts ===
Chart (2009)	Peak position
Australian Albums (ARIA)	2
Austrian Albums (Ö3 Austria)	4
Belgian Albums (Ultratop Flanders)	6
Belgian Albums (Ultratop Wallonia)	45
Canadian Albums (Billboard)	2
Dutch Albums (Album Top 100)	6
Finnish Albums (Suomen virallinen lista)	32
German Albums (Offizielle Top 100)	4
Greek Albums (IFPI)	19
Hungarian Albums (MAHASZ)	30
Irish Albums (IRMA)	4
Italian Albums (FIMI)	48
Japanese Top Album Sales (Billboard Japan)	46
Japanese Albums (Oricon)	34
Mexican Albums (Top 100 Mexico)	28
New Zealand Albums (RMNZ)	6
Polish Albums (ZPAV)	32
Scottish Albums (Official Charts)	3
South African Albums (RISA)	3
Spanish Albums (Promusicae)	40
Swedish Albums (Sverigetopplistan)	15
Swiss Albums (Schweizer Hitparade)	7
UK Albums (Official Charts)	3
US Billboard 200	1
US Indie Store Album Sales (Billboard)	4

=== Year-end charts ===
Chart (2009)	Position
Australian Albums (ARIA)	38
Belgian Albums (Ultratop Flanders)	91
Dutch Albums (Album Top 100)	94
German Albums (Offizielle Top 100)	100
UK Albums (OCC)	82
US Billboard 200	33

== Certifications ==
Region	Certification	Certified units/sales
Australia (ARIA)	Platinum	70,000^{^}
Canada (Music Canada)	Platinum	80,000^{^}
GCC (IFPI Middle East)	Gold	3,000^{*}
Ireland (IRMA)	Gold	7,500^{^}
Malaysia (RIM)	Gold	10,000
United Kingdom (BPI)	Gold	191,953
United States	—	1,004,000
^{*} Sales figures based on certification alone.^{^} Shipments figures based on certification alone.

== Release history ==
Region	Date	Edition	Format	Label
Ireland	March 6, 2009	Standard	CD; digital download	Sony Music
Germany	March 6, 2009	Standard	CD; digital download	Sony Music
Australia	March 6, 2009	Standard	CD; digital download	Sony Music
Hong Kong	March 9, 2009	Standard	CD; digital download	Sony Music
Poland	March 9, 2009	Standard	CD; digital download	Sony Music
New Zealand	March 9, 2009	Standard	CD; digital download	Sony Music
United Kingdom	March 9, 2009	Standard	CD; digital download	RCA; 19
Canada	March 10, 2009	Standard	CD; digital download	Sony Music
Europe	March 10, 2009	Standard; Deluxe	CD; CD+DVD; digital download	Sony Music
Mexico	March 10, 2009	Standard; Deluxe	CD; CD+DVD; digital download	Sony Music
Netherlands	March 10, 2009	Standard	CD; digital download	Sony Music
Philippines	March 10, 2009	Standard	CD; digital download	Sony Music
South Korea	March 10, 2009	Standard	CD; digital download	Sony Music
Taiwan	March 10, 2009	Standard	CD; digital download	Sony Music
Thailand	March 10, 2009	Standard; Deluxe	CD; CD+DVD; digital download	Sony Music
United States	March 10, 2009	Standard; Deluxe	CD; CD+DVD; digital download	RCA; 19
Brazil	March 11, 2009	Standard	CD; digital download	Sony Music
Sweden	March 11, 2009	Standard	CD; digital download	Sony Music
Italy	March 13, 2009	Standard	CD; digital download	Sony Music
Singapore	March 13, 2009	Standard	CD; digital download	Sony Music
Japan	March 25, 2009	Standard	CD; digital download	Sony Music
Japan	May 13, 2009	Deluxe	CD+DVD	Sony Music
