= My Life Would Suck Without You =

2009 single by Kelly Clarkson

Single by Kelly Clarkson

from the album All I Ever Wanted
- Released: January 13, 2009
- Recorded: 2008
- Studio: Conway Recording (Los Angeles, California); Dr. Luke's Studio (Malibu, California)
- Genre: Power pop; pop rock
- Length: 3:31
- Label: RCA
- Songwriters: Max Martin; Lukasz Gottwald; Claude Kelly; Kelly Clarkson (uncredited)
- Producers: Martin; Dr. Luke

Kelly Clarkson singles chronology
| "Don't Waste Your Time" (2007) | "My Life Would Suck Without You" (2009) | "I Do Not Hook Up" (2009) |

Music video
- "My Life Would Suck Without You" on YouTube

"My Life Would Suck Without You" is a song by American singer Kelly Clarkson from her fourth studio album, All I Ever Wanted (2009). Clarkson co-wrote the track with Claude Kelly and its producers Max Martin and Dr. Luke, but refused to include her name in the credits, not wanting to be associated with the lattermost. "My Life Would Suck Without You" was released as the lead single from the album and premiered on January 13, 2009, in the United States on New York City's Z100 radio station and was made available to download three days later. The song has met with positive reviews from music critics, who praised the song's pop composition, which incorporates dance and rock elements.

"My Life Would Suck Without You" peaked at the top of the Billboard Hot 100 when it moved up the chart 96 places from number 97 in its second week on the chart. The song's chart climbing gave Clarkson the record for a single with the furthest jump to number one on the Billboard Hot 100 after achieving the feat with her 2002 single "A Moment Like This". Outside of the United States, "My Life Would Suck Without You" topped the charts in Canada, Hungary, and the United Kingdom, and peaked within the top ten of the charts in Australia, Belgium, the Netherlands, the Republic of Ireland, Sweden, and Switzerland. In the United Kingdom, where the Idols franchise that spawned American Idol originated, Clarkson became the only alumnus of an international version of Pop Idol to top the UK Singles Chart until Canadian Idol alumnus Carly Rae Jepsen achieved the feat with "Call Me Maybe" in April 2012.

The accompanying music video was directed by Wayne Isham and presents Clarkson's relationship with her fictional boyfriend as being fluctuating and tumultuous as the two are depicted arguing and throwing out each other's belongings whilst mirroring the sentiments of the song and the positive influence each has on the other. The video was nominated for an MTV Video Music Award in the Best Female Video category in 2009.

== Background and release ==
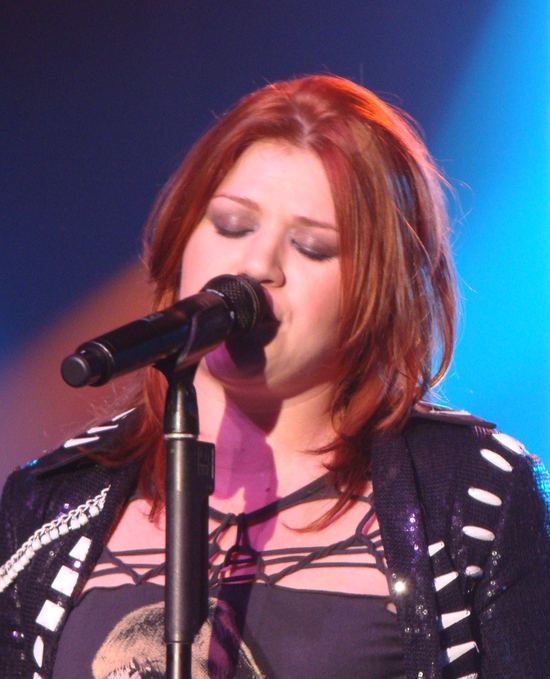
Clarkson performing as part of her All I Ever Wanted Tour

"My Life Would Suck Without You" was written by Lukasz "Dr. Luke" Gottwald, Max Martin and Claude Kelly, with additional uncredited songwriting by Kelly Clarkson. Record executive Clive Davis hired Gottwald and Martin to produce a new song for Clarkson in 2008 after her 2007 album My December, for which she refused to work with them, under-performed commercially. Clarkson explained that she objected to the collaboration through the entire process due to previous bad experiences working with Gottwald, who co-produced "Since U Been Gone" and "Behind These Hazel Eyes" for Clarkson in 2004. Clarkson eventually gave in claiming the label wouldn't put out her record otherwise. Yet, she was unsatisfied with the original version of the song, which she says differed greatly from the final version and included lyrical references to marijuana, so the writers assisted her in making the song more personal to her and "better than it was," according to Clarkson. After the song was finalized and significant changes to the lyrics had been made, Clarkson said RCA approached her about taking a proper writing credit for the track, which she refused in order to make a point to the label as they failed to meet her one request which was not to have her work with Luke again.

Claude Kelly worked on additional vocal production for the song. Dr. Luke provided the drums, bass and programming as well as working with Martin on guitars and synthesizers. The song was engineered at Conway Recording Studios in Los Angeles, California and Dr. Luke's Studio by Emily Wright and Sam Holland. Wright also edited the vocals with Aniela Gottwald and Kool Kojak.

Originally scheduled to hit airwaves on January 19, the song debuted on New York City Top 40 station Z100 on January 13, and the single was then transmitted digitally to radio stations at 6:00 pm EST for immediate airplay. It went officially for adds on radio station playlists on January 20, 2009. It was given a digital release on January 16, 2009, at Amazon.com's MP3 store, with a subsequent release on the US and Canadian iTunes Stores soon after. The song was also released as a download on January 16 in Australia on iTunes. On January 23, the song was announced as the most added song to radio in Australia.

== Composition ==
"My Life Would Suck Without You" is a pop, power pop, and pop rock song which is somewhat closer to dance-pop than her earlier hit "Since U Been Gone". The song is set in the time signature of common time and has a moderate fast tempo of 145 beats per minute. It was written in a key of A major and Clarkson's vocal range within the song spans from A_{3} to E_{5}. The instruments utilized in the song include synthesizers, guitars, drums, and bass. The song begins with mellow guitar plucking and transcends into a melody of synthesizers, guitars, and synthesized pop drums. The melody then cascades into a chorus of crashing cymbals, bass, synthesizers, and loud guitars. The lyrics for "My Life Would Suck Without You" are centered around a tumultuous relationship.

== Critical reception ==
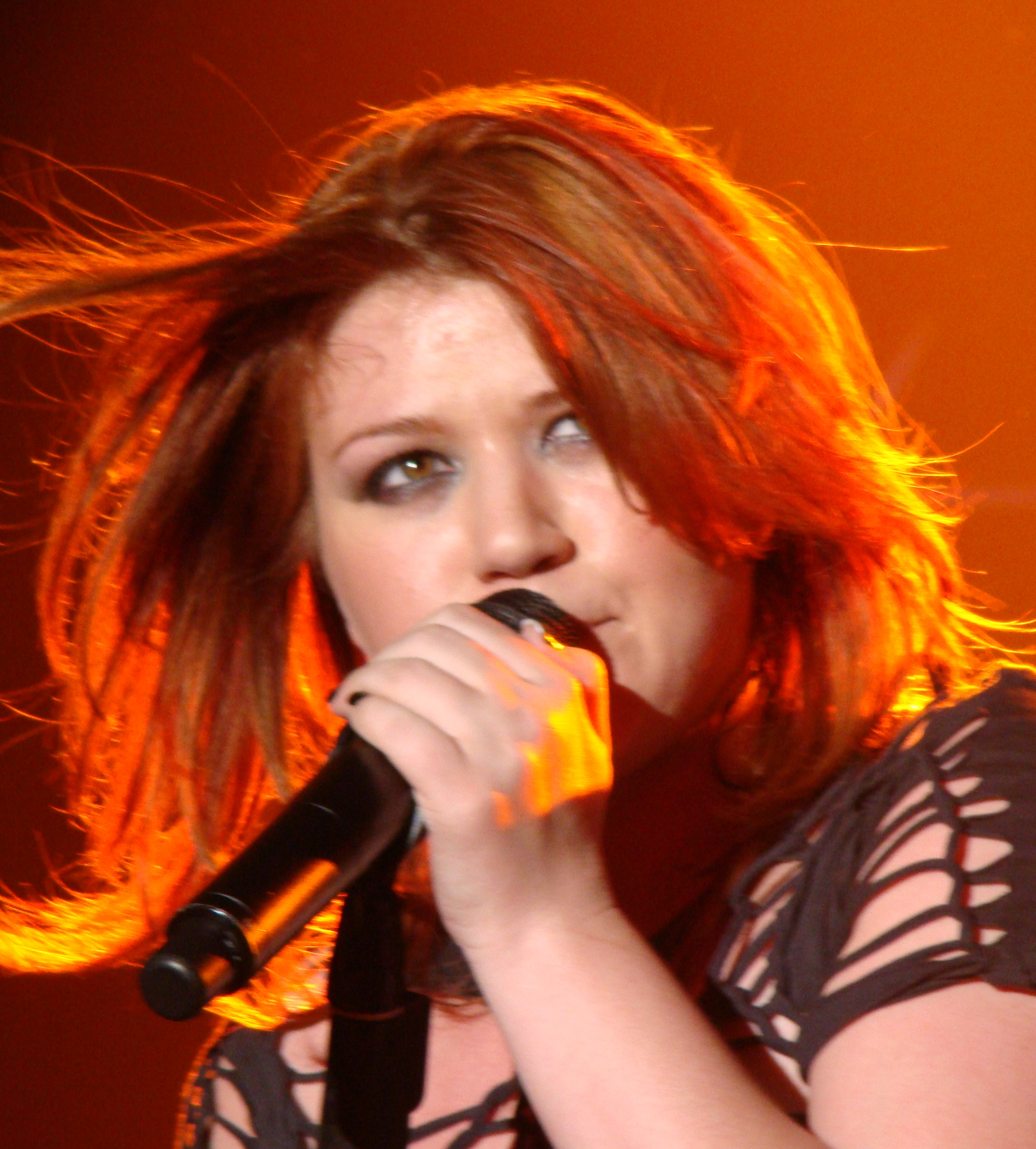
Clarkson performing as part of her All I Ever Wanted Tour

The song received generally positive reviews. Billboard labelled it "a propulsive blast of rock-tinged pop" and stated that "the countdown to No. 1 begins." About.com's Bill Lamb named it "pop perfection that could easily end up one of the biggest hits of the year." Rolling Stone called the song "fantastic — the early favorite for single of the year." and "straight-up pop [that] cascades into an avalanche of synths and a steady beat," mentioning that it "has all the characteristics of a surefire radio hit." TIME also listed "My Life Would Suck Without You" as number one in their top ten songs of 2009. Brian Mansfield from USA Today stated that there were "disco rhythms and lots of synth-dance-pop layers over the top, but the guitar pattern... keeps it from sounding too artificial"; eventually stating that he was "liking it".

The Los Angeles Times said the song "zooms forward from its guitar-plucky intro toward a cymbal-crashing climax without ever slowing down", commenting that the song would be "huge"; however, it also stated that the song had "empty calories delivered within those compressed, subtly Auto-Tuned vocals [riding] high-fructose beats." Nick Levine of Digital Spy rated the song four out of five stars, commenting "It's as original as shoving a slither of cheese between two slices of bread and calling it lunch, and the lyrics are a bit juvenile for the 26-year-old Clarkson, but these quibbles melt away when the heroically catchy chorus arrives. Best of all, you come away thinking that no-one else could have sung that heroically catchy chorus quite as well as Kelly Clarkson." Rhiannon Haller of Michigan Daily gave the same rating, praising it as "pure, radio-pop goodness that’s bound to become the guilty pleasure of many." On March 5, 2013, Billboard ranked the song number eight on its list of Top 100 American Idol Hits of All Time.

== Chart performance ==
"My Life Would Suck Without You" debuted at number 97 on the Billboard Hot 100 the week of January 31, 2009, and went to number one in its second week, setting the record for the furthest jump to number one in history. This is the second time Clarkson has set this record, after her debut single "A Moment Like This" went from number 52 to number one in 2002. "My Life Would Suck Without You" and Clarkson's own "Stronger (What Doesn't Kill You)" are also the only songs by an American Idol alum to top the Hot 100 chart that were not associated with the show. The song also advanced to number three on Billboard's Mainstream Top 40 chart, giving her her first top ten airplay hit since "Because of You". The song was dethroned from the top of the Hot 100 chart by Eminem's "Crack a Bottle" after two weeks. As of September 10, 2017, the song has sold over 2,855,000 copies in the United States.

In Australia, "My Life Would Suck Without You" debuted at number 16 on the ARIA Singles Chart and later peaked at number five on the chart.

In the United Kingdom, "My Life Would Suck Without You" debuted at the top of the UK Singles Chart on March 1, 2009 – for the week ending date March 7, 2009 – becoming Clarkson's first number one song in Britain, selling 51,114 copies in its first week as a digital release. As the Idols franchise originated in the United Kingdom, Clarkson became the only alumnus of an international version of Pop Idol to top the UK Singles Chart until Canadian Idol alumnus Carly Rae Jepsen topped the chart with "Call Me Maybe" in April 2012.

Despite "My Life Would Suck Without You" being Clarkson's highest-charting song in Britain, its stay on the chart is considerably less than some of her other singles. With 17 weeks inside the UK Singles Chart, it ranks behind her number five hit "Since U Been Gone" at 37 weeks and her number seven hit "Because of You" at 25 weeks. According to the Official Charts Company, as of April 2016, "My Life Would Suck Without You" has sold 423,000 copies in the United Kingdom.

== Music video ==
The music video for the song was directed by Wayne Isham and was shot in Los Angeles in December 2008. It is available for digital download on iTunes and is featured on the DVD of the Deluxe Edition of All I Ever Wanted. A preview of the video was shown during a commercial break for American Idol on January 28, 2009. The full video then premiered via AT&T's website directly after the broadcast. The video was subsequently nominated for a 2009 MTV Video Music Award in the category for Best Female Video.

The video begins with Clarkson sitting on a swing set at night before segueing into her earlier memories as a small girl playing on a playground together with her young male best friend, teasingly pushing each other around. The boy hands her a beaded necklace, which she puts on admiringly. The shot closes in on the necklace, then pulls back to reveal it's still worn as a bracelet on the wrist of now-adult Clarkson, her boyfriend (played by Houston Rhines) shows up at her apartment door, presumably after an argument. Clarkson teases him with a set of keys, which she then throws down the toilet. The two are then shown sitting on a couch, reading magazines, when Clarkson grabs her boyfriend's magazine. The two are shown throwing various possessions of one another out of the apartment window, though in a playful manner. Such items include numerous articles of clothing, magazines, a guitar (which Clarkson tries to stop him throwing out), and a fishbowl (with the fish being taken out and put in a glass first, after which they look out the window). After throwing these items out the window, the two are seen sitting affectionately on the couch. Clarkson and her boyfriend are shown still fighting and bickering as they did as children, over the remote control. The latter portion of the video shows the two driving in a first generation Ford Bronco (with the necklace/bracelet hanging from the rear view mirror), eventually getting into an argument. Distracted by the tiff over directions, the Bronco nearly ends up in a head-on collision with an approaching car. After spinning out to avoid the crash, Clarkson simply grabs her boyfriend and pulls him into a kiss, where the video ends.

== Track listings ==
Digital download

1. "My Life Would Suck Without You" (Album Version) - 3:31
2. "My Life Would Suck Without You" (Music Video) - 3:32

CD single

1. "My Life Would Suck Without You (Album Version) " – 3:31
2. "My Life Would Suck Without You (Instrumental Version)" – 3:31

Remixes

- Dr. Luke Remix featuring Former Fat Boy
- Friscia & Lamboy Radio Edit
- Bryan Reyes & Amy Alderman Miami Mix
- Chriss Ortega Radio & Club Mixes
- U.S. X Factor's inTENsity

== Credits and personnel ==
Credits are adapted from the liner notes of All I Ever Wanted, RCA Records, 19 Recordings.

Recording

- Engineered at Conway Recording Studios in Los Angeles, California and at Dr. Luke's Studio

Personnel

- Lead vocals – Kelly Clarkson
- Songwriting – Lukasz Gottwald, Max Martin, Claude Kelly
- Production – Dr. Luke, Max Martin
- Drums, bass and programming – Dr. Luke
- Guitars and synthesizers – Dr. Luke, Max Martin
- Engineering – Emily Wright, Sam Holland
- Vocal editing – Emily Wright, Aniela Gottwald (assistant), Kool Kojak (assistant)

== Charts ==
=== Weekly charts ===
| Chart (2009) | Peak position |
|---|---|
| Australia (ARIA) | 5 |
| Austria (Ö3 Austria Top 40) | 6 |
| Belgium (Ultratop 50 Flanders) | 18 |
| Belgium (Ultratip Bubbling Under Wallonia) | 2 |
| Canada Hot 100 (Billboard) | 1 |
| Canada AC (Billboard) | 44 |
| Canada Hot AC (Billboard) | 1 |
| Canada CHR/Top 40 (Billboard) | 4 |
| Czech Republic Airplay (ČNS IFPI) | 15 |
| Denmark (Tracklisten) | 31 |
| Europe (European Hot 100 Singles) | 2 |
| Finland Download (Latauslista) | 22 |
| Germany (GfK) | 6 |
| Global Dance Tracks (Billboard) | 24 |
| Hungary (Rádiós Top 40) | 1 |
| Ireland (IRMA) | 4 |
| Israel International Airplay (Media Forest) | 3 |
| Italy (FIMI) | 47 |
| Japan Hot 100 (Billboard) | 7 |
| Japan Adult Contemporary (Billboard) | 6 |
| Mexico Anglo (Monitor Latino) | 1 |
| Mexico (Billboard Mexican Airplay) | 24 |
| Netherlands (Dutch Top 40) | 3 |
| Netherlands (Single Top 100) | 5 |
| New Zealand (Recorded Music NZ) | 11 |
| Poland Digital Songs (Billboard) | 1 |
| Scottish Singles Sales (Official Charts) | 3 |
| Spain (Promusicae) | 38 |
| Sweden (Sverigetopplistan) | 2 |
| Switzerland (Schweizer Hitparade) | 5 |
| UK Singles (Official Charts) | 1 |
| US Billboard Hot 100 | 1 |
| US Adult Contemporary (Billboard) | 16 |
| US Adult Pop Airplay (Billboard) | 3 |
| US Dance Club Songs (Billboard) | 7 |
| US Dance Airplay (Billboard) | 3 |
| US Pop Airplay (Billboard) | 3 |
| US Rhythmic Airplay (Billboard) | 38 |

=== Year-end charts ===
| Chart (2009) | Position |
|---|---|
| Australia (ARIA) | 40 |
| Austria (Ö3 Austria Top 40) | 42 |
| Brazil (Crowley) | 85 |
| Canada (Canadian Hot 100) | 20 |
| Europe (European Hot 100 Singles) | 67 |
| Germany (Media Control GfK) | 32 |
| Hungary (Rádiós Top 40) | 16 |
| Japan (Japan Hot 100) | 60 |
| Japan Adult Contemporary (Billboard) | 12 |
| Netherlands (Dutch Top 40) | 14 |
| Netherlands (Single Top 100) | 65 |
| Sweden (Sverigetopplistan) | 31 |
| Switzerland (Schweizer Hitparade) | 55 |
| UK Singles (OCC) | 46 |
| US Billboard Hot 100 | 23 |
| US Adult Contemporary (Billboard) | 40 |
| US Adult Top 40 (Billboard) | 10 |
| US Mainstream Top 40 (Billboard) | 9 |

== Certifications and sales ==
| Region | Certification | Certified units/sales |
|---|---|---|
| Australia (ARIA) | Platinum | 70,000^{^} |
| Canada (Music Canada) | 2× Platinum | 80,000^{*} |
| Germany (BVMI) | Gold | 150,000^{‡} |
| Japan (RIAJ) Digital single | Gold | 100,000^{*} |
| New Zealand (RMNZ) | Platinum | 30,000^{‡} |
| South Korea (Gaon) | — | 104,324 |
| United Kingdom (BPI) | Platinum | 600,000^{‡} |
| United States | — | 2,855,000 |
^{*} Sales figures based on certification alone.^{^} Shipments figures based on certification alone.^{‡} Sales+streaming figures based on certification alone.

== Release history ==
| Country | Release date | Format | Label |
|---|---|---|---|
| North America | January 13, 2009 | Airplay | RCA Records |
| Europe | January 15, 2009 | Digital download | Sony Music |
| Canada | January 15, 2009 | Digital download | Sony Music |
| United States | January 15, 2009 | Digital download | RCA Records |
| Australia | January 19, 2009 | Digital download | Sony Music |
| Australia | February 2, 2009 | CD single | Sony Music |
| New Zealand | January 19, 2009 | Digital download | Sony Music |
| Italy | January 30, 2009 | Digital download | Sony Music |
| United Kingdom | February 21, 2009 | Digital download | RCA Label Group (UK) |
| United Kingdom | March 2, 2009 | CD single | RCA Label Group (UK) |
| Netherlands | February 16, 2009 | Digital download | Sony Music |
| Germany | February 27, 2009 | CD single; digital download | Sony Music |

== Cover versions ==
- "My Life Would Suck Without You" was covered in the episode "Sectionals" of the TV series Glee in 2009.
- "My Life Would Suck Without You" was covered in the seventh series of The X Factor UK by One Direction in 2010.
- "My Life Would Suck Without You" was covered by Erik Gronwall on his debut album in 2009.

== In popular culture ==
Michael Scott plays the song in "Ultimatum," a seventh-season episode of The Office, to celebrate Holly Flax not being engaged to AJ.

== See also ==
- List of Hot 100 number-one singles of 2009 (U.S.)
- List of Hot 100 number-one singles of 2009 (Canada)
- List of number-one singles from the 2000s (UK)
