= Cry (Kelly Clarkson song) =

2010 single by Kelly Clarkson

Single by Kelly Clarkson

from the album All I Ever Wanted
- Released: March 12, 2010
- Recorded: 2008
- Studio: Bay 7 Studios (Valley Village, CA); Sparky Dark Studio (New York, NY); Sunset Sound Studios (Hollywood, CA)
- Genre: Pop rock
- Length: 3:34
- Label: RCA
- Songwriters: Kelly Clarkson; Jason Halbert; Mark Townsend
- Producer: Howard Benson

Kelly Clarkson singles chronology
"All I Ever Wanted" (2010)	"Cry" (2010)	"Don't You Wanna Stay" (2010)

Audio
- "Cry" on YouTube

"Cry" is a song by American singer and songwriter Kelly Clarkson, taken from her fourth studio album, All I Ever Wanted (2009). It was written by Clarkson, Jason Halbert and Mark Townsend, with production being done by Howard Benson. It was released as the album's fourth single (fifth and final overall) only in Australia and Germany; it was released as a digital download on March 12, 2010 in Germany and added to Australian radio stations on March 15, 2010.

"Cry" is a pop rock ballad, with Clarkson adding that it is a "waltz" ballad with influences of country music. Inspired by a friendship that went sour, lyrically, "Cry" talks about betrayal. The song received positive reviews from music critics, who agreed the song matched Clarkson's ability to dominate a ballad, while also praising her vocals on the track and the track's composition. The song was covered by Lea Michele on a season three episode of Glee, and her version charted in Canada, Ireland and the United Kingdom.

== Composition and lyrics ==
The song was written by Kelly Clarkson, Jason Halbert and Mark Townsend. Production was done by Howard Benson, who was also responsible for providing keyboards and programming. Drums were played by Josh Freese, Paul Bushnell provided bass and guitar was played by Phil X. Mike Plotnikoff was responsible for recording, while digital editing was added by Paul Decarli, with additional engineering being done by Hatsukazu "Hatch" Inagaki. According to the sheet music published at Musicnotes.com by Alfred Publishing Company, "Cry" was written in the key of B♭ major, with a moderate tempo of 70 beats per minute. Clarkson's vocals span from the low note of B♭_{3} to the high note of F_{5}.

"Cry" is a power ballad, written as a "waltz" song, according to Clarkson, who also explained that it is "very much influenced by country." Lyrically, "Cry" talks about betrayal with Clarkson describing it as "the most personal song on the album." She also explained that the main inspiration behind the song was about a friendship that went wrong and she decided to write in the form of a relationship, because "usually people relate to those songs." She further added: "With that song, I went through a really shitty thing with someone who betrayed me. When I started writing the song I was like, 'I'm gonna write this like it's a guy and a relationship.'" In the chorus, she wonders, "Is it over yet? Can I open my eyes?."

== Release and reception ==
Clarkson originally wanted "Cry" to be released as the third single from the album, but her record label RCA decided to release "Already Gone" instead. Later, "Cry" was released as the album's fourth single in Germany and Australia. It was released as a digital download in Germany on March 12, 2010, and was sent to Australian radio on March 15, 2010, where it became the second most-added song to radio that week.

=== Critical response ===
The song received positive reviews by music critics. Ann Powers of Los Angeles Times considered an "old-fashioned tear-jerker that Clarkson does so well." J. Freedom du Lack of The Washington Post agreed, also calling it a "big, bereft tear-jerker, a Clarkson specialty." Kerri Mason of Billboard noted that the song is "memorable", while Evan Davies of Now called it a "requisite (and equally decent) ballad that make[s] use of her impressive range." While analysing her vocal performance on the album, Daniel Brockman wrote for The Boston Phoenix that her "tone-deaf emotional bludgeoning tends to work in her favor on monstrous power ballads like 'Cry' and 'Already Gone,' which linger in your memory long after the Max Martin love hangover fades." Eric R. Danton of The Hartford Courant noted that she "shines brightest" on the album's ballads. Jon Dolan of Blender noted that, on "Cry", "breaking up triggers an eye-flood of biblical proportion."

For Elle J Small of BBC Music, "'Cry' gleams from the rest of the pack with its beautiful guitar riffs and gushing melodies. Clarkson is the cherry on the cake of this future hit." Michael Cragg of musicOMH described it as "particularly dreary", whilst Jon Caramanica of The New York Times called it "a shouter of a breakup song." Jody Rosen of Rolling Stone agreed with Clarkson definition of the song, naming it "a big waltz-time ballad whose tune holds a hint of Nashville-pop twang. Clarkson grew up in Texas listening to country; 'Cry' serves notice that she could give Carrie Underwood a run for her money." Huffington Post's Mike Ragogna noted that her vocals on the track "blow[s] away any comparisons to her youngish peers, such as those of the Disney variety." In a less favorable review, Jonathan Keefe of Slant Magazine stated that "the use of electronic vocal enhancement throughout the album [...] strips the natural warmth of her voice on 'Cry', making her delivery sound distant and tinny".

== Credits and personnel ==
Recording

- Recorded at Bay 7 Studios, Valley Village, CA; Sparky Dark Studio, Calabasas, CA; Sunset Sound Studios, Hollywood, CA
- Assisted at Sunset Sound by Graham Hope

Personnel

- Songwriting - Kelly Clarkson, Jason Halbert, Mark Lee Townsend
- Production - Howard Benson
- Vocals - Kelly Clarkson
- Keyboards and Programming - Howard Benson
- Drums - Josh Freese
- Bass - Paul Bushnell
- Guitar - Phil X
- Recording - Mike Plotnikoff
- Digital Editing - Paul Decarli
- Additional engineering - Hatsukazu "Hatch" Inagaki

Credits adapted from All I Ever Wanted booklet liner notes.

== Release history ==
Region	Date	Format
Germany	March 12, 2010	Digital download
Australia	March 15, 2010	Contemporary hit radio

== Glee version ==
"Cry"

Single by Glee Cast
- Released: May 1, 2012
- Recorded: 2012
- Genre: Pop rock
- Length: 3:31
- Label: Columbia
- Songwriters: Kelly Clarkson, Jason Halbert, Mark Townsend

The song was covered by actress Lea Michele in the Glee episode "Choke", which first aired on May 1, 2012. It was later available for digital download.

=== Charts ===
Chart (2012)	Peak position
Canadian Hot 100	96
Irish Singles Chart	100
UK Singles Chart	116
