= I Do Not Hook Up =

2009 single by Kelly Clarkson

Single by Kelly Clarkson

from the album All I Ever Wanted
- Released: March 31, 2009
- Recorded: 2008
- Studio: Bay7 Studios (Valley Village, Los Angeles); Sparky Dark Studio (Calabasas, California); Sunset Sound Studios (Hollywood, California)
- Genre: Dance-rock; power pop
- Length: 3:20
- Label: RCA
- Songwriters: Kara DioGuardi; Greg Wells; Katy Perry
- Producer: Howard Benson

Kelly Clarkson singles chronology
"My Life Would Suck Without You" (2009)	"I Do Not Hook Up" (2009)	"Already Gone" (2009)

Music video
- "I Do Not Hook Up" on YouTube

"I Do Not Hook Up" is a song recorded by American singer Kelly Clarkson for her fourth studio album, All I Ever Wanted (2009), released as the second single from the album. Katy Perry originally co-wrote the song with Kara DioGuardi and Greg Wells for herself, but after being dropped from Def Jam, she gave the song and "Long Shot" to Clarkson. RCA Records serviced the song to mainstream radio in the United States on April 14, 2009. The song is a dance-rock and power pop song that is structured upon a muscular arrangement with lyrics about empowerment and healthy relationships.

The song received positive reviews from music critics, with many praising its arrangement and Clarkson's vocals. Some critics gave different interpretations of the song's message. It fared well domestically, peaking at number 20 on the US Billboard Hot 100 and sold nearly 700,000 downloads. It was also certified Gold in Canada and Australia, peaking within the top 20 in both markets. It failed to make as strong of an impact in several other international markets, peaking within the lower regions of the charts in countries like Austria and Germany. The accompanying music video was released in the United States on May 1, 2009.

== Background ==
"I Do Not Hook Up" was written and composed by Katy Perry, Kara DioGuardi, and Greg Wells. The song was originally penned by Perry for a studio album titled Fingerprints made between Katy Hudson and One of the Boys. This release never materialized, so she subsequently gave this song and "Long Shot" to Clarkson's label to be included on her fourth studio album, All I Ever Wanted (2009). It was produced and programmed by Howard Benson, who with Jamie Muhoberac provided the keyboards featured on the track. Mike Plotnikoff was the engineer behind recording the song, which took place at three different studios in California: Bay7 Studios in Valley Village, Sparky Dark Studio in Calabasas, and Sunset Sound Studios in Hollywood. Graham Hope assisted Plotnikoff at Sunset Sound Studios in recording "I Do Not Hook Up". Instrumentation featured on the song, besides keyboards, includes the drums, bass, and guitars, which were performed by musicians Josh Freese, Paul Bushnell, and Phil X respectively. "I Do Not Hook Up" was released as the second single from All I Ever Wanted (2009). It was released to Russian radio on March 31, 2009, as the second single off the album. RCA Records serviced the song to contemporary hit radios on the week of April 14, 2009 in the United States.

== Composition ==
"I Do Not Hook Up" is a melodic dance-rock and power pop song with a length of 3:20 (3 minutes and 20 seconds). The song is built around a muscular rock arrangement that is accompanied by danceable beats, guitar riff and strong vocals. According to the digital music sheet published at Musicnotes.com by EMI Music Publishing, it is written in the key of E major. The song is set in common time a follows a moderately fast tempo of 144 beats per minute. Clarkson's vocals ranged from B_{3} to an E_{5}. Chuck Campbell of Boulder Daily Camera describes the song as "another flurry of almost desperate, albeit effective, rock/dance mania." Lyrically, "I Do Not Hook Up" is about keeping a healthy and romantic relationship alive. It has been viewed as a feisty independent-woman anthem by music critics. Other critics felt that the song's lyrics promote chastity. Jon Caramanica of The New York Times defines the song's lyrics to be about falling for an addict and dangling love as a tool for recovery.

== Critical reception ==
Billboard's Kerri Mason, in her review of the album, comments that "she enunciates the heck out of two tunes co-written by Perry." Bill Lamb of About.com praised the song's hook, chorus and Clarkson's voice, writing that they take the record to the next level. He was dismissive of the song's arrangement, describing it as "standard rock". Lamb gave "I Do Not Hook Up" a four-star rating, stating that "Kelly Clarkson proves she knows her way all around a melodic rock song, and you will find yourself singing along." Ann Powers, a writer for Los Angeles Times, commented that it "should be heard by every teen girl contemplating chucking her purity ring." The Harvard Crimson writer Olivia S. Pei finds "I Do Not Hook Up" as a refreshing change from music like Katy Perry's single "I Kissed a Girl" (One of the Boys, 2008), while noting irony in the fact that Perry co-wrote the single. Pei also adds that "I Do Not Hook Up" and "My Life Would Suck Without You" show off Clarkson's vocal versatility, but fails to make up for the absence of creative rhythms. Matt Busekroos of The Quinnipiac Chronicle commented that Clarkson adds more to the Perry-penned tracks "with her voice and revamped studio production."

Nick Levine of Digital Spy gave the song a four-star rating, praising the song as "a giddy power-pop nugget with a Haribo buzz of a chorus." Levine also praised Clarkson's vocal abilities, commenting that she "tears into the anti-one night stand lyrics with gusto." A writer for Female First described the single as "a feisty anthem with a catchy guitar riff and chorus, which Kelly bellows out with her amazing voice. After just one listen you find yourself already singing along." Blake Solomon, a writer for AbsolutePunk, praised the recording as a forceful pop song reminiscent of Clarkson's earlier singles from her second studio album, Breakaway (2004), writing that it relies on a massive chorus that will "destroy radio as we know it" but comments that it is "less serious and dancey as hell." Patrick Ferrucci of The New Haven Register praised it as a "fiery and empowering anthem for young females". Lisa Norman of This is Nottingham labeled "I Do Not Hook Up" as one of the album's highlights. Allmusic writer Stephen Thomas Erlewine also listed it as a highlight of All I Ever Wanted, writing that she "sounds impassioned and invested in these numbers, selling every one of the skyscraper hooks, but better still she sounds relatable, pulling listeners into a song instead of keeping them at a distance." Sal Cinquemani of Slant Magazine comments that "it doesn't say much that her take on "I Do Not Hook Up" improves on Perry's original demo version." Rolling Stone's Jody Rosen praised the song as a "spitfire mix of melody and crashing guitars" and described it as "one of the most raucous odes to chastity in recent memory." On March 5, 2013, Billboard ranked the song #45 in its list of Top 100 American Idol Hits of All Time.

== Chart performance ==
"I Do Not Hook Up" was a moderate hit in North American markets. In the United States, the song debuted on the Billboard Hot 100 at number 88 on the week ending May 2, 2009. In the following week, the song jumped 42 places to number 46. it continued to fluctuate in the top 40 until the week of June 18, 2009, where it peaked on the chart at number 20. "I Do Not Hook Up" also charted on several Billboard charts, including Hot Digital Songs, Radio Songs and Pop Songs. The song has sold 823,000 downloads in the United States, as of September 2017. In Canada, the single debuted on the Canadian Hot 100 at number 65 on the week ending May 9, 2009. It rose to number 44 in the next week and slowly ascended the chart, reaching its peak position at number 13 on the week ending July 18, 2009. "I Do Not Hook Up" was certified gold by Music Canada for sales of 40,000 downloads on January 5, 2010.

"I Do Not Hook Up" did not fare as well in the international markets. The song had some success in Australia, where it peaked at number nine on the week of June 21, 2009 and held on the chart for ten weeks. It was awarded the gold certification by the Australian Recording Industry Association (ARIA) for sales of 35,000 units. In Belgium, the song peaked on the chart at number eight, its highest international peak. "I Do Not Hook Up" failed to match the success of "My Life Would Suck Without You" in Sweden. Where as "My Life Would Suck Without You" lasted 22 weeks on the chart, "I Do Not Hook Up" charted for two weeks, only reaching a peak of number 30 on the singles chart. The song reached its lowest international peak in the Netherlands at number 97.

== Music video ==
The music video was directed by Bryan Barber and was shot on March 25, 2009 in Los Angeles. A 30-second preview debuted of the video on Clarkson's official website. Clarkson revealed to Access Hollywood the plot of the video:"I go into fantasy mode. So the girl that’s a good girl, in her fantasy, she’s always hooking up. I’m throwing guys around". The video was supposed to be released on April 20 on MTV. Clarkson stated in the Access Hollywood interview that there are three guys for her in the video, but in the final version of the video there are only two, meaning that the fantasy with the third man was cut off from the video. The video begins with Clarkson at a social event where she is bored and gets excited just as she sees a handsome waiter. She imagines seducing him, right on the table, and imagines the two kissing. Soon after, she realizes that was only her imagination and a guy that is sitting next to her says that "the strawberry is delicious" while eating the chocolate covered strawberry. In the second scene, Clarkson is at a bar with her friends enjoying and watching the guys in place. They then have the idea of dancing on the counter, to call attention. It's there that Clarkson slips and falls on the floor, but she quickly gets up and gives a happy scream. (Making reference to a scene of Cameron Diaz in the movie What Happens in Vegas). In the end, she holds the guy she was interested in and winks for the camera. It then shows her and her friends laughing at what they could do. There are also scenes where Clarkson is singing the song with her band on stage.

The music video of Clarkson's 2011 single "Mr. Know It All" also features Clarkson watching snippets of the "I Do Not Hook Up" music video on a Sony Google TV.

== Promotion ==
Clarkson performed the song live on Good Morning America on March 20, 2009, and also on the March 14, 2009 episode of Saturday Night Live. She also performed the song live in the UK at The Album Chart Show, and later on The Tonight Show with Jay Leno on May 12, 2009 and The Ellen DeGeneres Show on May 14. Clarkson also performed "I Do Not Hook Up" on several Australian television shows, including Rove, and Australia's Funniest Home Videos Show in early June. Clarkson performed the single on Monday, 8 June on GMTV. Also on the same day, she appeared on Loose Women performing the single. Clarkson appeared on the hit United States show So You Think You Can Dance on July 2, during the results show and performed it. The song was included on tours All I Ever Wanted Summer Fair Mini-Tour and All I Ever Wanted Tour.

== Track listings ==
Single (Europe - CD)
No.	Title	Writer(s)	Producer(s)	Length
1.	"I Do Not Hook Up" (album version)	Kara DioGuardi; Greg Wells; Katy Perry	Howard Benson	3:20
2.	"I Do Not Hook Up" (instrumental version)	DioGuardi; Wells; Perry	Benson	3:20

Single EP (Australia - CD) (88697 52450 2)
No.	Title	Writer(s)	Producer(s)	Length
1.	"I Do Not Hook Up" (album version)	DioGuardi; Wells; Perry	Benson	3:20
2.	"I Do Not Hook Up" (instrumental version)	DioGuardi; Wells; Perry	Benson	3:20
3.	"My Life Would Suck Without You" (Chriss Ortega radio mix)	Lukasz Gottwald; Claude Kelly; Max Martin	Dr. Luke; Martin; Chriss Ortega^{[a]}	3:40
4.	"My Life Would Suck Without You" (F&L radio edit)	Gottwald; Kelly; Martin	Dr. Luke; Martin; F&L^{[a]}	3:53

Remixes (Europe - MP3 download)
No.	Title	Writer(s)	Producer(s)	Length
1.	"I Do Not Hook Up" (album version)	DioGuardi; Wells; Perry	Benson	3:20
2.	"I Do Not Hook Up" (Ashanti Boyz radio mix)	DioGuardi; Wells; Perry	Benson; Ashanti Boyz^{[a]}	3:39
3.	"I Do Not Hook Up" (Ashanti Boyz club mix)	DioGuardi; Wells; Perry	Benson; Ashanti Boyz^{[a]}	5:56

Notes

- ^{^a} denotes additional producer

== Remixes/covers ==
1. I Do Not Hook Up (Bimbo Jones club mix) – 6:48
2. I Do Not Hook Up (Bimbo Jones radio edit) – 3:56
3. I Do Not Hook Up (Bimbo Jones radio mix) – 3:56
4. I Do Not Hook Up (Bimbo Jones club edit) – 4:50
5. I Do Not Hook Up (DJ Tim A club remix) – 7:05
6. I Do Not Hook Up (Tim Dance Vocal Experience remix) – 6:29
7. I Do Not Hook Up (Mike Junior remix) – 3:43

German vocalist Martina Dennis did a Eurodance (also referred to as 'Hands Up') cover, which also features many remixes. Brian Fallon of The Gaslight Anthem did a cover on a radio broadcast.

== Credits and personnel ==
Credits adapted from the liner notes of All I Ever Wanted, RCA Records, in association with 19 Recordings.

Recording

- Recorded at Bay7 Studios in Valley Village, California, Sparky Dark Studio in Calabasas, California, and Sunset Sound Studios in Hollywood, California

Personnel

- Songwriting - Katy Perry, Kara DioGuardi, Greg Wells
- Production - Howard Benson
- Vocals - Kelly Clarkson
- Programming - Howard Benson
- Keyboards - Howard Benson, Jamie Muhoberac
- Drums - Josh Freese
- Bass - Paul Bushnell
- Guitar - Phil X
- Recording engineer - Mike Plotnikoff, Graham Hope (assisted at Sunset Sound Studios)

== Charts ==
=== Weekly charts ===
Weekly performance for "I Do Not Hook Up"
Chart (2009)	Peak position
Australia (ARIA)	9
Austria (Ö3 Austria Top 40)	68
Belgium (Ultratip Bubbling Under Flanders)	8
Canada Hot 100 (Billboard)	13
Canada CHR/Top 40 (Billboard)	9
Canada Hot AC (Billboard)	2
Czech Republic Airplay (ČNS IFPI)	45
European Hot 100 Singles (Billboard)	81
Germany (GfK)	55
Hungary (Rádiós Top 40)	10
Ireland (IRMA)	30
Italy (Musica e dischi)	47
Mexico Singlés Airplay (Billboard)	4
Netherlands (Dutch Top 40)	19
Netherlands (Single Top 100)	97
New Zealand (Recorded Music NZ)	31
Scottish Singles Sales (Official Charts)	14
Slovakia Airplay (ČNS IFPI)	35
Sweden (Sverigetopplistan)	30
UK Singles (Official Charts)	36
US Billboard Hot 100	20
US Adult Pop Airplay (Billboard)	12
US Pop Airplay (Billboard)	8

=== Year-end charts ===
Year-end performance for "I Do Not Hook Up"
Chart (2009)	Position
Canada (Canadian Hot 100)	78
Hungary (Rádiós Top 100)	75
US Billboard Hot 100	91
US Adult Top 40 (Billboard)	43
US Mainstream Top 40 (Billboard)	40

== Certifications ==
Certifications and sales for "I Do Not Hook Up"
Region	Certification	Certified units/sales
Australia (ARIA)	Gold	35,000^{^}
Canada (Music Canada)	Gold	20,000^{*}
^{*} Sales figures based on certification alone.^{^} Shipments figures based on certification alone.

== Release history ==
Release dates and formats for "I Do Not Hook Up"
Region	Date	Format(s)	Label(s)	Ref.
Russia	March 31, 2009	Airplay	Sony	
United States	April 14, 2009	Airplay	RCA	
Australia	April 21, 2009	CD single	Sony Music	
Worldwide	April 23, 2009	Digital EP	19	
Germany	May 22, 2009	CD single	Sony Music	
United Kingdom	June 1, 2009	CD single	RCA (UK)	
