= All I Ever Wanted (Aranda song) =

2008 song by Aranda

Song by Aranda

from the album Aranda
- Released: April 22, 2008
- Length: 3:50
- Label: Astonish
- Songwriters: Sam Watters, Louis Biancaniello, Dameon Aranda

"All I Ever Wanted" is a song by American rock band Aranda, from their debut studio album, Aranda (2008). The song was written and produced by Sam Watters and Louis Biancaniello and Dameon Aranda. In 2009, the song was covered by American singer Kelly Clarkson, for her album of the same name, and it was released as a single on March 9, 2010.

== Writing ==
"All I Ever Wanted" was written by Dameon Aranda, Louis Biancaniello and Sam Watters.

== Kelly Clarkson version ==
"All I Ever Wanted"

Single by Kelly Clarkson

from the album All I Ever Wanted
- Released: March 9, 2010
- Studio: Homesite 13 (Novato, CA); Starstruck Studios (Nashville, TN); Sunset Sound (Los Angeles, CA)
- Genre: Soul; pop rock
- Length: 3:59
- Label: RCA
- Songwriters: Sam Watters; Louis Biancaniello; Dameon Aranda
- Producers: Sam Watters; Louis Biancaniello

Kelly Clarkson singles chronology
"Already Gone" (2009)	"All I Ever Wanted" (2010)	"Cry" (2010)

Audio
- "All I Ever Wanted" on YouTube

American pop rock singer Kelly Clarkson recorded a cover version of the song, and released it as the fourth single and title track from her fourth studio album of the same name.

=== Release ===
The single was officially sent to U.S. radio on March 9, 2010. It was released commercially as a digital download in the US and Canadian iTunes stores on March 15, 2010.

=== Composition and critical reception ===
The Clarkson version of "All I Ever Wanted" is a song set in common time composed in a moderate tempo, written in G minor. The cover version has a vocal range from the low note of F_{3} to the high note of E♭_{5}. Critical reviews by contemporary music critics have been generally positive. Los Angeles Times declared "The title track evokes the soul-rock fusions of Timbaland and Rihanna". Jon Dolan, from Blender magazine noted on the album review: 'Sometimes her vocal oomph gets reduced or technologically fuzzed [...] But she ably sinks her chops into a Franz Ferdinand funk groove on “All I Ever Wanted”'. Sarah Rodman, from The Boston Globe, wrote: '"I Do Not Hook Up" and the title song instantly lodge in the brain, even as their bittersweet sentiments drip a bit of acid". Evan Sawdey, PopMatters reviewer, says, "Though some of the post-breakup bitterness of My December still lingers here (most notably on the storming title track), "All I Ever Wanted" remains a remarkably upbeat record, which, in turn, plays to Clarkson’s strengths".

=== Charts ===
The song debuted at number 99 on the Billboard Hot 100, and peaked at number 96 on the Hot 100. It has sold 129,000 copies to date.

Chart (2010)	Peak position
US Billboard Hot 100	96
US Adult Pop Airplay (Billboard)	11
US Pop Airplay (Billboard)	37

==== Year-end charts ====
Chart (2010)	Position
US Adult Pop Songs (Billboard)	40

=== Release history ===
Region	Date	Format
United States	March 9, 2010	Mainstream and Hot AC airplay
United States	March 15, 2010	Digital download
Canada	March 15, 2010	Digital download
