= Already Gone (Kelly Clarkson song) =

2009 single by Kelly Clarkson

Single by Kelly Clarkson

from the album All I Ever Wanted
- Released: August 11, 2009
- Recorded: 2008
- Studio: Chalice Recording Studios (Los Angeles, California); 4014 Mixing Studios (Los Angeles, California)
- Genre: Pop
- Length: 4:41
- Label: RCA
- Songwriters: Kelly Clarkson; Ryan Tedder
- Producer: Ryan Tedder

Kelly Clarkson singles chronology
"I Do Not Hook Up" (2009)	"Already Gone" (2009)	"All I Ever Wanted" (2010)

Music video
- "Already Gone" on YouTube

"Already Gone" is a song performed by American pop singer-songwriter Kelly Clarkson from her fourth studio album, All I Ever Wanted. It is co-written by Clarkson and Ryan Tedder, who also produced it. The song was released as the album's third single in August 2009. Lyrically, "Already Gone" is about the breakup of a relationship; the music consists of an arrangement using a piano, drums, and string instruments.

The production and release of "Already Gone" have been surrounded in controversy. Clarkson claimed that Tedder re-used the musical arrangement on the Beyoncé's "Halo", and stated that the public would incorrectly assume that she had stolen it; Tedder declared the accusations hurtful and false. After failing to prevent the song from being included on All I Ever Wanted because the track listing had already been finalized and the album was already being pressed, Clarkson then voiced her anger towards her record company bosses for subsequently deciding to release it as a single. The accompanying music video was directed by Joseph Kahn, who complained that he was not allowed to fully realize his vision, and stated he was unhappy with the final result. It features scenes of Clarkson dressed in a gold gown and expensive jewelry while lying on a chaise longue in an apartment. Shots of floating objects intersperse a second scene in which Clarkson, wearing a black dress, sings in a rehearsal room while surrounded by the instruments of an invisible orchestra.

Despite her dissatisfaction with the song's release as a single, Clarkson began promoting it in July 2009, performing it live on the Late Show with David Letterman and other talk shows. In the fall, she performed the song on VH1 Divas and at the American Music Awards. She included "Already Gone" in the encore set of her 2009 All I Ever Wanted Tour. Clarkson has also performed the song in tours after. The song has received positive reviews. It peaked at number 13 on the Billboard Hot 100, and was certified Platinum in Canada and Gold in Australia.

== Writing and composition ==
"Already Gone"
A 27-second sample of the bridge and chorus of "Already Gone", highlighting the musical composition, and Clarkson's vocals which span from B_{3} to E_{5}.

"Already Gone" was co-written by Clarkson and OneRepublic lead singer Ryan Tedder. Tedder describes it as "an emotional, heartbreaking breakup song." Tedder and Clarkson wrote six songs together for inclusion on Clarkson's fourth studio album All I Ever Wanted, and "Already Gone" is one of three that appear on the track list.

"Already Gone" is a pop ballad. The music is described by Sarah Liss of CBC News as having "a pounding heartbeat, twinkly piano and swooping strings", and by James Montgomery of MTV as having "somber piano, crashing drums and hand-claps". Eric R. Danton from The Hartford Courant explains that the piano and string arrangements "roll mournfully" over the percussion. The sheet music indicates that the song is set in common time and has a moderately slow tempo with a metronome of 74 beats per minute. It is written in the key of A major arranged in the chord progression of A–Esus4–E–F♯m–D–A–Esus4-E–F♯m–D–Bm–D in the verses, and A–Esus4–E–F♯m–E–D–E in the chorus. The vocal range spans from B_{3} to E_{5}.

The song's narrative is in first person, and depicts Clarkson telling her lover that although he has done nothing wrong in their relationship, it was never meant to be and is destined for failure. She tells her partner that he "couldn't have loved [her] better", but to avoid hurting him in the future, he should move on, as she "is already gone". Clarkson sings with what Danton describes as "layered vocals".

== Beyoncé similarities and Ryan Tedder feud ==
"Ryan and I met each other at the record label, before he was working with anyone else [...] We wrote about six songs together, four or five of them made the album. It was all fine and dandy. I'd never heard of a song called 'Halo'. Beyoncé's album came out when my album was already being printed. No-one's gonna be sittin' at home, thinking 'Man, Ryan Tedder gave Beyoncé and Kelly the same track to write to.' No, they're just gonna be saying I ripped someone off. I called Ryan and said, 'I don't understand. Why would you do that?'"

— Kelly Clarkson, speaking to CBC News

Before teaming with Clarkson to write "Already Gone", Ryan Tedder had co-written Beyoncé's song "Halo" for her album I Am... Sasha Fierce. Clarkson later heard "Halo" and noticed distinct similarities between the two songs, most notably in the melancholy piano, loud drums, and handclaps in their backing tracks. She confronted Tedder about using the same arrangement, arguing that people would assume she had stolen it from Knowles. Clarkson tried to have the song removed from All I Ever Wanted, but it was too late to make any changes; the album was already being pressed and it was not possible to make any changes to the track listing.

Tedder responded to the allegations with a statement posted on his MySpace account, arguing that the two songs are "entirely different" and that the criticism was "hurtful and absurd". He told website Idolator that he was "absolutely livid", and added, "If I was going around and selling the same track to the biggest artists in the world, how long would my career last? It's ludicrous. [...] I'm not an idiot. I'm not the kinda guy who's gonna bust my ass for ten years to try and pull a fast one on Beyoncé or Kelly."

"'Already Gone' is one of the best songs I've written or produced since 'Bleeding Love' and stands tall on it's [sic] own merits apart from 'Halo'. They are two entirely different songs conceptually, melodically, [and] lyrically and I would never try to dupe an artist such as Kelly Clarkson or Beyoncé into recording over the same musical track, the idea is both hurtful [and] absurd. I think when people hear 'Already Gone' they will hear what I hear—one of the greatest female vocalists on earth giving her most haunting and heart-breaking performance on a song she helped write. I challenge people to listen and form their own opinions."

— Statement released by Ryan Tedder, reacting to criticisms from Clarkson

Clarkson fought with her bosses to prevent "Already Gone" from being released as a single, out of respect for Beyoncé. She wanted "Cry" to be released instead, but conceded that, "in the end, they're releasing it without my consent. It sucks, but it's one of those things I have no control over... At this point, the record company can do whatever they want with it." Tedder, however, was pleased that the song was released, saying that he liked it more than "Halo". The song was sent to radio airplay on August 11, 2009. In September 2009, Clarkson told MTV that it was unfortunate the two songs sound exactly the same, but noted that they have different vocal melodies.

Clarkson continued feuding with Tedder in 2010. In December 2009, Tedder said that he was no longer angry over the accusations Clarkson made, but warned, "fool me once, shame on you; fool me twice, shame on me. [...] I don't wanna get some crazy-ass backlash or get my head snapped off for writing a hit song." He later told The Denver Post that he had gotten over the situation and was working on new material for Clarkson's fifth album. Clarkson, however, told the Daily Star that she was writing and recording new songs with new, low-profile producers. "I don't like working with people who have worked with everyone. Sometimes I get blackmailed into doing so by my label," she said, "but I prefer collaborating with people who aren't on the grid. I don't want to sound exactly like other people's records." In May, an unreleased electro-pop song by Clarkson called "Wash, Rinse, Repeat" was leaked on the Internet. The song contains auto tuned lyrics that Idolator said were likely written about Tedder: "I can't take the pressure of new. Give me old, rip it off. / Let's see if it sticks to the wall again. / Does it sound familiar? Does it linger in your ear? / Like something you remember from just last year?" and "Music from the past, from the present, well, just last week / We will change a note and get away with it, wait and see." Tedder said that he thought the song was written about him, too, but admitted he liked the song. "I think Kelly speaks her mind regardless of anything. She's great with lyrics, and I love that she is her own person. She's no puppet."

== Critical reception ==
Ken Tucker from Entertainment Weekly said Clarkson "knows that the anguish she likes to sing about is enjoyed by millions of people as grandiose admissions of vulnerability. Yet the music that delivers that message is anything but vulnerable. There's a reason they call them power ballads: a sad song blasted at full volume is a metaphor for finding strength in pain." His point was echoed by Danton of The Hartford Courant, who stated that Clarkson "pours on the heartache", and by Greg Kot of the Chicago Tribune, who called the song an "extravagant ballad".

Mike Ragogna added that it "already sounds timeless" in The Huffington Post. In the Houston Chronicle, Joey Guerra wrote that "'Already Gone' ... is a striking change of pace [from the other songs on All I Ever Wanted]. The tempo slows, and Tedder gives Clarkson's vocals a gauzy quality that synchs perfectly with the mournful lyrics. It's an emotive, emotional shot of electricity." Billboard likened Clarkson's "ghostly delivery" to that of Sinéad O'Connor. Jonathan Keefe from Slant Magazine said that "Ryan Tedder's production on 'Already Gone' is identical to Beyoncé's 'Halo' to the point of distraction, but [Already Gone] has a far stronger melody and Clarkson turns in one of her most evocative performances". Jim Abbott of the Orlando Sentinel wrote that the lyrics are not unique or enlightening, and Tedder's production on the track was disliked. Jon Caramanica from The New York Times thought that Tedder "drowns [Clarkson] under murky piano on 'Already Gone'."

On March 5, 2013, Billboard ranked the song at number 19 in its list of Top 100 American Idol Hits of All Time. Additionally, it also appeared at number nine of Clarkson's Top 15 Biggest Billboard Hot 100 hits through the week ending April 29, 2017.

== Chart performance ==
In North America, digital sales of "Already Gone" resulted in it entering the Billboard Hot 100 and Canadian Hot 100 charts on March 28, 2009, at number 70. It dropped out of both charts the following week, and re-entered them in August 2009. It peaked at number 13 on the Billboard Hot 100, and number 15 on the Canadian Hot 100, charting for 31 weeks on the former and 32 weeks on the latter. The song peaked at number three on the Adult Contemporary chart, where it charted for 51 weeks, and number five on the Pop Songs chart, where it charted for 23 weeks. Its greatest success was on the Adult Top 40 chart, where it peaked at number one and remained atop for eight consecutive weeks. As of September 2017, 2,009,000 copies of the single had been sold in the US, while in Canada it was certified also certified Platinum, denoting sales of 80,000 units. Internationally, "Already Gone" had moderate success. It entered the Australian Singles Chart at number 70 on July 13, 2009, peaked at number 12 on September 13, 2009, and was certified Gold. In New Zealand, it peaked at number 23 and spent eight weeks on the chart. It charted on the UK Singles Chart on August 9, 2009, at number 153 and peaked at number 66 in September. Elsewhere in Europe, the song charted in Austria, Belgium, the Netherlands, Sweden, and Switzerland.

== Music video ==
The music video for "Already Gone" was shot in Toronto, Ontario, Canada, on June 20, 2009, at The Carlu, and was directed by Joseph Kahn, with whom Clarkson had previously worked on the videos for "Never Again", "Walk Away" and "Behind These Hazel Eyes". The video is set primarily in an apartment and a rehearsal room and features Clarkson "lounging on chaises and lolling around while zazzed [sic] out in the sort of gowns and jewels we've yet to spot this girl-next-door pop star wearing in real life". Clarkson explains that the video is a departure from her previous videos in that she is "completely glammed out. It's the opposite of my everyday life." The video begins with Clarkson alone in an apartment wearing a gold gown, sequined elbow gloves, and a large pearl necklace, while lying on a chaise longue. This scene alternates with a second location, where Clarkson wears a black dress, singing in a rehearsal room, surrounded by invisible members of an orchestra playing their instruments. As the video alternates back and forth between the two locations, the scenes are interspersed with slow-motion shots of falling champagne glasses, floating pearls, and flying violins. It uses a shortened version of the song, cutting out the final chorus.

The video was uploaded to Clarkson's official website on July 27. Following its release, Kahn posted statements to his Twitter account that his vision of the video was not realized, and complained, "I don't think I won a single battle". A review in Rolling Stone described the video as "boring stuff", and Leah Collins of Dose said the video was uncontroversial, "unless there's more meaning to those lingering shots on pearl necklaces than we thought".

== Live performances ==
Due to the controversy surrounding the album version's similarity with "Halo", and because Clarkson wanted to perform what she later called a "diva-esque" version of "Already Gone", she composed a new arrangement with her musical director Jason Halbert for performances during her 2009 All I Ever Wanted Tour. She sings it as part of the concert's encore. Danton was impressed by the acoustic arrangement when she performed on the first night of her tour in Uncasville, Connecticut, and Keith O'Connor wrote in The Republican that it was one of the night's highlights. Lori Hoffman of Atlantic City Weekly described Clarkson's performance of the song as an "emotional wallop" and a stand-out moment at Trump Taj Mahal in Atlantic City, New Jersey. Jocelyn Vena from MTV reported that Clarkson's performance of the song was one of the fans' favorite moments, and Rolling Stone noted that during her performance at Hammerstein Ballroom, New York, the audience sang "Already Gone", and Clarkson "was happy to play cheerful conductor, holding up her mic stand to the crowd." On October 31, in St. Charles, Missouri, Clarkson mashed "Already Gone" with "Halo".

Clarkson began promoting "Already Gone" on television by debuting it on the Late Show with David Letterman on July 13, in a live performance in which she "belted out" the lyrics to the reworked arrangement. The same arrangement was used when she sang on VH1 Divas later in the year. Her performance of the song at the 37th Annual American Music Awards was graded as "B+" in the Los Angeles Times, which noted that she was "solid" and "sound[ed] terrific". Jeremy Blacklow from Access Hollywood described it as "pitch-perfect".

== Track listing ==
European version
No.	Title	Writer(s)	Producer(s)	Length
1.	"Already Gone"	Kelly Clarkson; Ryan Tedder	Tedder	4:41
2.	"Already Gone" (Bimbo Jones Radio Mix)	Clarkson; Tedder	Tedder; Marc Jackson Burrows^{[a]}; Lee Dagger^{[a]}	3:34

Australian version
No.	Title	Writer(s)	Producer(s)	Length
1.	"Already Gone" (Album Version)	Clarkson; Tedder	Tedder	4:41
2.	"Already Gone" (Instrumental Version)	Clarkson; Tedder	Tedder	3:31

Notes

- ^{^a} denotes additional producer

== Personnel ==
Credits are adapted from the liner notes of All I Ever Wanted, RCA Records, 19 Recordings.

- Kelly Clarkson - All vocals
- Brian Ray - Guitars
- Ryan Tedder - Keyboards, Synthesizers, Programming and all other instrumentation

== Production ==
- Written by Kelly Clarkson and Ryan Tedder
- Published by Songs For My Shrink/Kobalt Songs Music Publishing/Write 2 Live/Kobalt Songs Music Publishing
- Arranged and Produced by Ryan Tedder
- Recorded by Ryan Tedder and Joe Zook at Chalice Recording Studios and 4014 Mixing Studios; assisted by Jared Newcomb at Chalice and Daniel Piscina at 4014
- Mixed by Serban Ghenea

== Charts ==
=== Weekly charts ===
Weekly chart performance for "Already Gone"
Chart (2009–2010)	Peak position
Australia (ARIA)	12
Austria (Ö3 Austria Top 40)	36
Belgium (Ultratip Bubbling Under Flanders)	15
Canada Hot 100 (Billboard)	15
Canada AC (Billboard)	1
Canada Hot AC (Billboard)	1
Canada CHR/Top 40 (Billboard)	17
Germany (GfK)	23
Mexico Inglés Airplay (Billboard)	44
Netherlands (Dutch Top 40 Tipparade)	8
Netherlands (Single Top 100)	78
New Zealand (Recorded Music NZ)	23
Slovakia Airplay (ČNS IFPI)	17
Sweden (Sverigetopplistan)	26
Switzerland (Schweizer Hitparade)	15
UK Singles (Official Charts)	66
US Billboard Hot 100	13
US Adult Contemporary (Billboard)	3
US Adult Pop Airplay (Billboard)	1
US Pop Airplay (Billboard)	5

=== Monthly charts ===
Monthly chart performance for "Already Gone"
Chart (2009)	Position
Brazil (Brasil Hot 100 Airplay)	77

=== Year-end charts ===
2009 year-end chart performance for "Already Gone"
Chart (2009)	Position
Australia (ARIA)	86
Canada (Canadian Hot 100)	70
Switzerland (Schweizer Hitparade)	96
US Billboard Hot 100	95
US Adult Top 40 (Billboard)	36

2010 year-end chart performance for "Already Gone"
Chart (2010)	Position
Canada (Canadian Hot 100)	88
US Billboard Hot 100	74
US Adult Contemporary (Billboard)	5
US Adult Top 40 (Billboard)	19

== Certifications ==
Certifications and sales for "Already Gone"
Region	Certification	Certified units/sales
Australia (ARIA)	Gold	35,000^{^}
Canada (Music Canada)	Gold	40,000^{^}
United States	—	2,009,000
^{^} Shipments figures based on certification alone.

== Release history ==
Release dates and formats for "Already Gone"
Region	Date	Format(s)	Label(s)	Ref.
United States	August 11, 2009	Mainstream radio	RCA	
Australia	August 21, 2009	CD single	Sony Music	
Worldwide	September 7, 2009	Digital download	RCA	
Germany	September 18, 2009	CD single	RCA; Sony Music	

== See also ==
- List of Adult Top 40 number-one songs of the 2000s
