= If I Can't Have You (Kelly Clarkson song) =

Song by Kelly Clarkson

from the album All I Ever Wanted
- Recorded: 2008
- Studio: Henson Recording, Hollywood; Ocean Way, Nashville; Blackbird, Nashville; Hong Kong International Airport
- Genre: Electro
- Length: 3:39
- Label: RCA
- Songwriters: Kelly Clarkson, Ryan Tedder
- Producer: Ryan Tedder

"If I Can't Have You" is a song performed by American singer and songwriter Kelly Clarkson, derived from her fourth studio album All I Ever Wanted (2009). The song was composed by Clarkson and American songwriter and producer Ryan Tedder, who was at helm for the song's production. "If I Can't Have You" is an electro song. The song has garnered comparisons to Miley Cyrus' "Fly on the Wall".

"If I Can't Have You" garnered mixed to positive reviews from music critics, with many praising it for its unique sound and as one of the album's highlights. Others however dismissed its similarities to the synthesized pop music on mainstream radios and its use of Auto-tune. Upon the release of All I Ever Wanted in the United States, "If I Can't Have You" entered the Billboard Bubbling Under Hot 100 Singles at number eighteen.

== Background ==
"If I Can't Have You" was written and produced by American producer, musician, and songwriter Ryan Tedder, while additional writing and production was performed by Kelly Clarkson and Greg Ogan, respectively. Tedder also took part in programming and arranging the track as well as performing on all instruments that complete the song's structure, with the exception of the drums, which were played by Eddie Fisher, and additional guitars, performed by Alain Johnannes. Tedder and Craig Durrance were the engineers behind recording the song, which took place at several studios and at the Hong Kong International Airport in China. "If I Can't Have You" was recorded at Henson Recording Studios in Hollywood, California with assistance from Tom Syrowski. It was also recorded in Nashville, Tennessee at Ocean Way with Joe Martino as the assistant engineer and at Blackbird Studios with assistance from engineer Mike Rooney. "If I Can't Have You" was selected for inclusion in All I Ever Wanted (2009). Clarkson recorded an acoustic version of the song for her first EP, The Smoakstack Sessions (2011).

== Composition ==
"If I Can't Have You" is an electro song with a length of 3:20 (3 minutes and 20 seconds). The song, according to Blake Solomon of AbsolutePunk, bears beats reminiscent of musical compositions by American singer Britney Spears while its composition is reminiscent of 1980s dance music. The composition is composed of synthesizers, vocoders, radioed-out vocal repeats, reverbed guitar and keyboard hits. According to the digital music sheet published at Musicnotes.com by Kobalt Music Publishing America, Inc., it is written in the key of E minor. The song is set in common time a follows a moderately fast tempo of 140 beats per minute. Clarkson's vocals ranged from G3 to an E5. The song has garnered comparison's to "Fly on the Wall" (Breakout, 2008) by American singer and songwriter Miley Cyrus. Nick Levine of Digital Spy describes it as "The Killers covering Miley Cyrus's 'Fly On The Wall'" Chuck Campbell of Boulder Daily Camera describes the song as "whip-whirling electricity" while Greg Kot of the Chicago Tribune labeled it as "thumping disco." The Quinnipiac Chroonicle's Matt Busekroos found the recording to be similar to Clarkson own "Judas" (My December, 2007)

== Critical reception ==
Bill Lamb of About.com dismissed "If I Can't Have You" as being to similar in sound to Miley Cyrus' "Fly on the Wall", deeming the song as one that should not have been included on All I Ever Wanted. The Harvard Crimson writer Olivia S. Pei finds it, "Already Gone" and "Impossible" as the album's soothing tunes, writing that they "to the cheerful and energetic whole" and generate "some of the album's moving pieces". Pei also commented that the song's use of Auto-Tune gives it an impersonal feel. Blake Solomon, a writer for AbsolutePunk, compared the recording to musical compositions by American pop singers Lady Gaga and Katy Perry, writing that its lack of youthful authenticity, which he claims is displayed in the two artists' works. Sal Cinquemani of Slant Magazine commented that the vocal procession present in the song creates a synthetic tone, but otherwise found the song to be "terrific".

Jim Abbot of The Orlando Sentinel named it a guilty pleasure, while defining it as "predictable radio-friendly pop". Rachael Linder of The Daily Iowan praised it as an example of what Clarkson does well on All I Ever Wanted, which she claims as "integrating fast beats with slower ones, making the songs play off each other and flow beautifully." The Huffington Post's Mike Ragogna compared the record's intro to Joe Jackson's "Steppin' Out" (Night and Day, 1982), writing that the overuse of Korg rhythm pattern in the 80s compared to the overuse of electronic synthesizers in modern pop music, but the Korg rhythm pattern was not easily recognized throughout the song as modern pop synthesizers are. Ragogna further commented that with the addition of several instruments in "If I Can't Have You" "you're grinning your ass off."

== Credits and personnel ==
Credits adapted from the liner notes of All I Ever Wanted, RCA Records, in association with 19 Recordings.

Recording

- Recorded at Henson Recording Studios in Hollywood, California, Ocean Way Recording and Blackbird Studios in Nashville, Tennessee, and Hong Kong International Airport in Hong Kong, China

Personnel

- Songwriting – Kelly Clarkson, Ryan Tedder
- Vocals – Kelly Clarkson
- Production – Ryan Tedder, Greg Ogan (additional)
- Programming, arranging and all instruments (except for drums) – Ryan Tedder
- Drums – Josh Freese
- Guitars (additional) – Alain Johannes
- Recording engineer – Ryan Tedder, Craig Durrance, Tom Syrowski (assisted at Henson Recording Studios), Joe Martino (assisted at Ocean Way Recording), Mike Rooney (assisted at Blackbird Studios)

== Chart performance ==
Upon the release of All I Ever Wanted, due to digital downloads, "If I Can't Have You" entered the Billboard Bubbling Under Hot 100 Singles for one week at number eighteen.

Chart (2009)	Peak position
US Bubbling Under Hot 100 Singles (Billboard)	18
