= Kelly Clarkson videography =

Videos and media by American singer

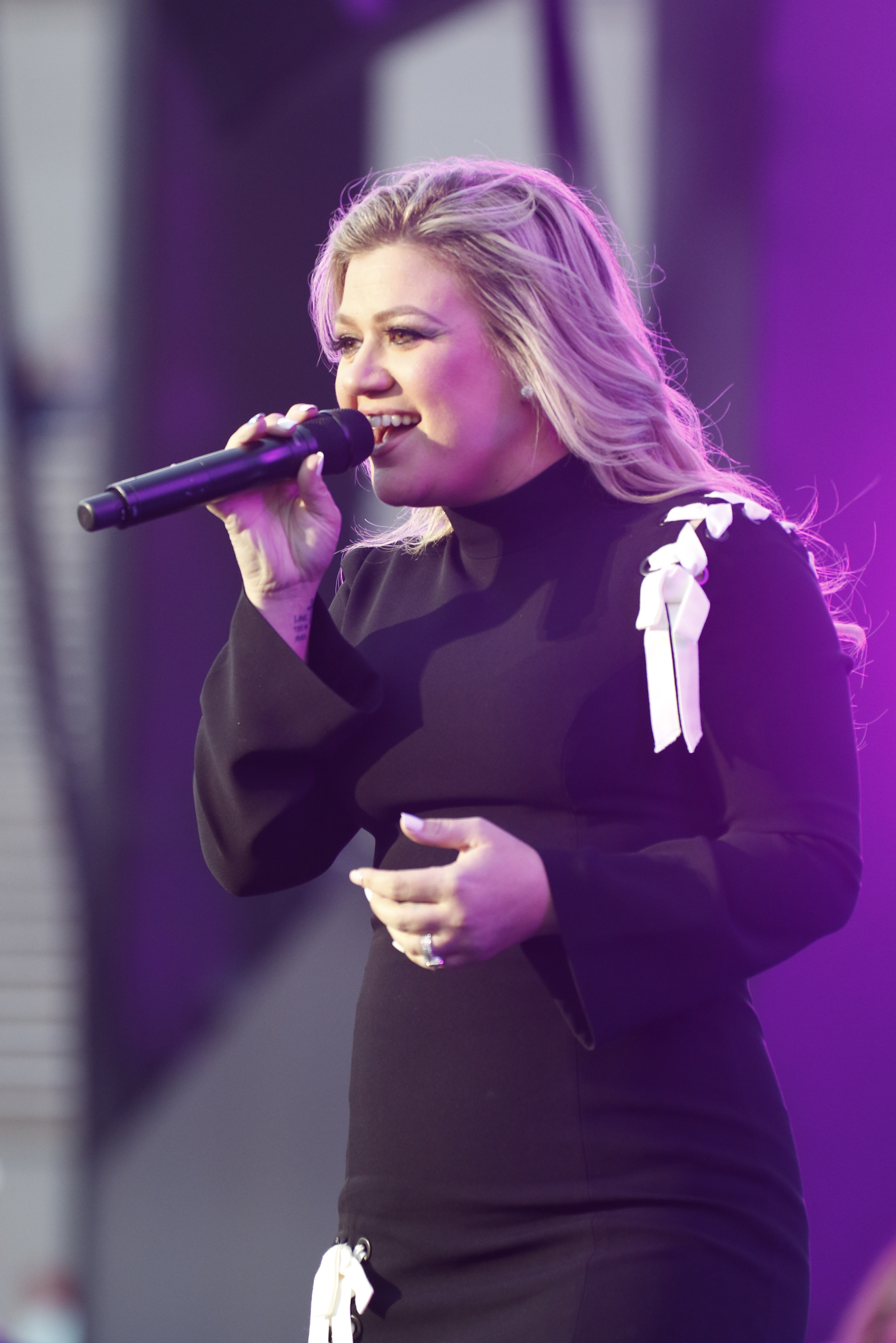
Clarkson performing in 2018

American singer Kelly Clarkson has released two video albums and has appeared in forty-four music videos. In 2002, she made her debut music video appearance for the video "Before Your Love", which was immediately released after winning the first season of American Idol. An accompanying music video for the companion single, "A Moment Like This", was also issued later that same year. From her debut studio album, Thankful (2003), Clarkson released music videos for the singles "Miss Independent", "Low", and "The Trouble with Love Is", the foremost of which earned her three MTV Video Music Award nominations, including Best New Artist in a Video. Thankful was immediately followed by the release of Clarkson's debut video album Miss Independent that same year. In 2004, a music video for her single "Breakaway" was released to promote the Disney feature film The Princess Diaries 2: Royal Engagement. Clarkson's sophomore studio album Breakaway (2004) issued accompanying music videos for its singles "Since U Been Gone", "Behind These Hazel Eyes", "Because of You", "Walk Away", and an additional live video for "Breakaway". The music videos for the songs "Since U Been Gone" and "Because of You" earned a total of three MTV Video Music Awards and a MuchMusic Video Award. Clarkson's second video album Behind Hazel Eyes was released in 2005 as a companion piece to Breakaway.

From her third studio album My December (2007), three music videos were issued to accompany its singles "Never Again", "One Minute", and "Don't Waste Your Time". In 2009, Clarkson's fourth studio album All I Ever Wanted released three music videos for the songs "My Life Would Suck Without You", "I Do Not Hook Up", and "Already Gone", with the foremost receiving a MTV Video Music Award nomination. From 2011 to 2012, three music videos were released from her fifth studio album Stronger to accompany its singles "Mr. Know It All", "Stronger (What Doesn't Kill You)", and "Dark Side", all of which collective earned three nominations for an MTV Video Music Award and MuchMusic Video Award. Stronger was followed by her first greatest hits album, Greatest Hits – Chapter One (2012), which released music videos for its singles "Catch My Breath", "Don't Rush" and "People Like Us", the latter two of which was nominated for a CMT Music Award and an MTV Video Music Award, respectively. From 2013 to 2014, three music videos were released to promote her first Christmas album Wrapped in Red: two live performance videos for the songs "Underneath the Tree" and "Silent Night" from the television special Kelly Clarkson's Cautionary Christmas Music Tale, and an accompaniment video for the titular track. Throughout 2015, her seventh studio record Piece by Piece issued three music videos for "Heartbeat Song", "Invincible" and "Piece by Piece". Clarkson's eighth studio album, Meaning of Life, issued music videos for "Love So Soft", "I Don't Think About You", and "Meaning of Life".

In addition to her musical work, Clarkson has appeared in film and television as an actress and a participant. She made her film debut as a lead actress on the 2003 feature From Justin to Kelly. Prior to winning American Idol, Clarkson has appeared as an extra in the television series That '80s Show and Sabrina the Teenage Witch in 2002. She made her television debut as an actress on the television drama American Dreams in 2003 and has appeared as guest judge and a mentor in various television competitions, including American Idol, Canadian Idol, X Factor, and The Voice. Clarkson starred as a judge and mentor on the short-lived series Duets in 2012 and debuted as a coach on the fourteenth season of The Voice in 2018. She also hosts her own daytime talk show, The Kelly Clarkson Show, which premiered in 2019. Clarkson has appeared in advertisements to promote brands such as Ford, NASCAR, Pepsi, Amazon Kindle, and Citizen Watches.

== Video albums ==
List of video releases, with relevant details and certifications
Title	Album details	Peak chart positions	Certifications
Title	Album details	US Video	Certifications
Miss Independent	Released: November 18, 2003; Label: RCA, 19, S; Format: DVD	—	RIAA: Gold
Behind Hazel Eyes	Released: March 29, 2005; Label: StudioWorks, 19; Format: DVD	7	
"—" denotes a recording that did not chart or was not released in that territory.

== Music videos ==
List of music videos
Year	Title	Other performer(s)	Director(s)	Description	Ref.
2002	"Before Your Love"	None	Antti J	Clarkson prepares to leave for a party hosted by her boyfriend in honor of winning American Idol. Credited as Clarkson's first music video.	
2002	"A Moment Like This"	None	Antti J	Singing at an empty theater, Clarkson reflects on her tenure on the first season of American Idol. Immediately released after "Before Your Love".	
2003	"Miss Independent"	None	Liz Friedlander	Clarkson performs at a house party until meeting a man whose reflection she keeps seeing in mirrors. It received three nominations at the 2003 MTV Video Music Awards, including Best New Artist in a Video.	
2003	"Low"	None	Antti J	Clarkson sings and drives through a desert with her old boyfriend's car, which she later drives off a cliff.	
2003	"The Trouble with Love Is"	None	Bryan Barber	Clarkson witnesses various troubled relationships in an apartment where couples are viewing the film Love Actually on its rooftop.	
2004	"Breakaway"	None	Dave Meyers	Clarkson reminisces her journey from a small town girl to a pop star at the premiere of the film The Princess Diaries 2: Royal Engagement.	
2004	"Since U Been Gone"	None	Alex De Rakoff	Clarkson decimates the apartment her ex-boyfriend shares with another woman. It won two MTV Video Music Awards for Best Female Video and Best Pop Video at the 2005 presentation.	
2005	"Behind These Hazel Eyes"	None	Joseph Kahn	Clarkson attempts to escape from her wedding after seeing visions of her groom having an affair. The video received a nomination for a MuchMusic Video Award.	
2005	"Because of You"	None	Vadim Perelman	Clarkson is reminded of her troubled divorced childhood by her younger self to stop her own household from falling apart. It won the MTV Video Music Award for Best Female Video at the 2006 MTV Video Music Awards and a MuchMusic Video Award at the 2006 event.	
2006	"Walk Away"	None	Joseph Kahn	People from different walks of life across the city begin to sing the song while Clarkson is performing it live at the radio station.	
2006	"Breakaway"	None	None	Released exclusively to European countries, Clarkson performs the song live from the Hammersmith Apollo in London.	
2006	"Go"	None	Christian Lamb	Produced by the Ford Motor Company for its "Bold Moves" marketing campaign, two manifestations of Clarkson (in monochrome and color) attempt to outrace each other while driving in 2007 Ford Shelby GT500 Mustangs.	
2007	"Never Again"	None	Joseph Kahn	Clarkson haunts her ex-husband for attempting to murder her in order to elope with his mistress.	
2007	"One Minute"	None	None	Released exclusively to Australia, Clarkson performs the song live from the Take 40 Australia's Live Lounge program.	
2007	"Because of You"	Reba McEntire	Roman White	Playing 1930s lounge performers at a singing bar, McEntire tries to convince Clarkson to leave an abusive relationship. It was nominated for a CMT Music Award for Collaborative Video of the Year in 2008.	
2007	"Don't Waste Your Time"	None	Roman White	Clarkson plays a darker version of Sleeping Beauty featuring a prince who is having a severe difficulty of finding her.	
2009	"My Life Would Suck Without You"	None	Wayne Isham	Clarkson's erratic relationship with her boyfriend transits from tumultuous taunting to dysfunctional love. There are also cut to shots of Clarkson performing with her band. The video was nominated for an MTV Video Music Award for Best Female Video.	
2009	"I Do Not Hook Up"	None	Bryan Barber	Clarkson plays a good girl with romantic fantasies.	
2009	"Already Gone"	None	Joseph Kahn	Clarkson performs the song as a phantom accompanied by a mirage of musical instruments.	
2010	"Don't You Wanna Stay"	Jason Aldean	Paul Miller	Aldean and Clarkson perform the song live from the 2010 CMA Awards. It received a nomination for a CMT Music Award in 2011.	
2011	"Mr. Know It All"	None	Justin Francis	Clarkson reproaches mainstream media's perception of her character. It was nominated for a MuchMusic Video Award in 2012.	
2011	"Stronger (What Doesn't Kill You)"	None	Shane Drake	Clarkson forms a global flash mob featuring audience-submitted videos of various people performing the song in different locations. It received a MuchMusic Video Award nomination in 2012.	
2012	"Dark Side"	None	Shane Drake	Clarkson comforts downtrodden people suffering from bullying, unemployment, war, and weight issues. It was nominated for an MTV Video Music Award for Best Video with a Message.	
2012	"Get Up (A Cowboys Anthem)"	None	None	Behind-the-scenes footage of Clarkson recording the song, interspersed with Dallas Cowboys archival vignettes.	
2012	"Catch My Breath"	None	Nadia Marquard Otzen	Clarkson conjures the elements representing breath-like emotions.	
2012	"Don't Rush" (CMA Awards Performance 2012)	Vince Gill	Paul Miller	Clarkson and Gill perform the song live from the 2012 CMA Awards. It was nominated for a CMT Music Award in 2013.	
2013	"People Like Us"	None	Chris Marrs Piliero	Clarkson covertly rescues a young girl from a monochromatic world. The video was nominated for an MTV Video Music Award for Best Video with a Social Message.	
2013	"Tie It Up"	None	Weiss Eubanks	Clarkson performs at a wedding party; featuring audience-submitted content of people in wedding-themed events.	
2013	"Underneath the Tree"	None	Hamish Hamilton; Weiss Eubanks	Featuring behind-the-scenes footage of Kelly Clarkson's Cautionary Christmas Music Tale television special, Clarkson performs a reprise of the song.	
2013	"Silent Night"	Reba McEntire; Trisha Yearwood	Hamish Hamilton	Clarkson, Yearwood, and McEntire perform the song live from Kelly Clarkson's Cautionary Christmas Music Tale television special.	
2014	"Wrapped in Red"	None	Weiss Eubanks	Clarkson performs the song while reminiscing her Christmas past.	
2015	"Heartbeat Song"	None	Marc Klasfeld	Various heartbroken people find a chance to love again as Clarkson performs the track.	
2015	"Invincible"	None	Alon Isocianu	Accompanied by Clarkson, women of different walks of life begin to break free from their adversities.	
2015	"Second Hand Heart"	Ben Haenow	James Lees	Haenow hitchhikes his way through Nashville to go home to Clarkson.	
2015	"All I Ask of You" (From Josh Groban: Stages Live)	Josh Groban	Dick Carruthers	Groban and Clarkson perform the song live from Stages Live television special.	
2015	"Piece by Piece"	None	Alon Isocianu	Presented in black-and-white, Clarkson celebrates women of all ages with her daughter.	
2017	"Love So Soft"	None	Dave Meyers	Clarkson sings at different setups of how love can come across — from explosive and defiant, to bold, sexy & sassy.	
2018	"I've Loved You Since Forever"	Hoda Kotb	None	Clarkson sings the lullaby from a recording studio, accompanied by a silhouette animation of a mother and her child.	
2018	"I Don't Think About You"	None	Sarah McColgan	Clarkson, empowered by the afflictions endured by the ghosts of her younger self, sings her past hardships away—now proud of the woman she has become.	
2018	"Meaning of Life"	None	Sarah McColgan	Clarkson's darkened past is cascaded by a new light by finding the "meaning of life"—the love of her children.	
2019	"Broken & Beautiful"	None	Jay Martin	Clarkson sings in her dressing room with her daughter, River. Meanwhile, her UglyDolls character, Moxy, sneaks her way into the theater and on stage alongside Clarkson.	
2020	"Under the Mistletoe"	Brett Eldredge	Jay Martin	Animated versions of Clarkson and Eldrege team up with Santa Claus to help various couples busk in blissful Christmas romance.	
2021	"I Would've Loved You"	Jake Hoot	Taylor Ballantyne	Hoot and Clarkson sing the track in an empty Wiltern Theatre.	
2023	"Favorite Kind of High"	None	Weiss Eubanks; Johnny Mars	Clarkson performs the song live during her show at the Belasco Theatre in April 2023.	
2025	"Where Have You Been"	None	Weiss Eubanks; Johnny Mars	Clarkson and her band performing the song in a theater in Montana.	

== Filmography ==
List of film roles, showing year released and notes
Year	Title	Role	Notes	Ref.
2002	Issues 101	Crystal		
2003	From Justin to Kelly	Kelly Taylor		
2011	Broke*	Herself	Documentary	
2017	The Star	Leah	Voice role	
2019	UglyDolls	Moxy	Voice role	
2020	Trolls World Tour	Delta Dawn	Voice role	

== Television ==
List of television roles, showing year released and notes
Year	Title	Role	Notes	Ref.
2002	That '80s Show	Dancer	Season 1, episode 2 (Uncredited role)	
2002	Sabrina the Teenage Witch	Girl	Season 6, episode 20 (Uncredited role)	
2002	American Idol	Contestant	Season 1, 24 episodes (Winner)	
2002	Mad TV	Herself	Season 8, episode 1	
2002	Diary	Herself	Season 1, one episode	
2003	Australian Idol	Mentor	Season 1, one episode	
2003	American Juniors	Musical guest	Season 1, episode 12	
2003	American Dreams	Brenda Lee	Season 2, episode 1	
2003	An American Idol Christmas	Herself	Television special	
2003–04	World Idol	Herself	Two-episode special (Runner-up)	
2004	King of the Hill	Herself (voice)	Season 8, episode 19	
2004	American Dreams	Brenda Lee	Season 3, episode 9	
2004	Kelly, Ruben & Fantasia: Home for Christmas	Herself	Television special	
2005	Saturday Night Live	Musical guest	Season 30, episode 12	
2005	Damage Control	Herself	Season 1, episode 4	
2006	CMT Giants: Reba	Herself	Television special	
2007	Reba	Kelly	Season 6, episode 8	
2007	CMT Crossroads	Herself	Episode 24	
2009	London Live	Herself	Series 5, episode 4	
2009	X Factor	Mentor	Season 2, one episode	
2009	Saturday Night Live	Musical guest	Season 34, episode 18	
2009	Get Schooled	Herself	Documentary	
2010	Superstar K	Guest judge	Season 2, one episode	
2011	Phineas and Ferb	Herself (voice)	Season 3, episode 139	
2012	Saturday Night Live	Musical guest	Season 37, episode 11	
2012	The Voice	Adviser	Season 2, 4 episodes	
2012	Duets	Judge / Mentor	Season 1, 9 episodes	
2012	Blake Shelton's Not So Family Christmas	Herself	Television special	
2013	Who Do You Think You Are?	Herself	Season 4, episode 1	
2013	The Crazy Ones	Herself	Season 1, episode 1	
2013	Kelly Clarkson's Cautionary Christmas Music Tale	Herself	Television special	
2014	Nashville	Herself	Season 2, episode 11	
2015	American Idol	Mentor	Season 14, episode 23	
2015	Josh Groban: Stages Live	Herself	Television special	
2016	American Idol	Guest judge	Season 15, episode 16	
2016	A Pentatonix Christmas Special	Herself	Television special	
2017	The Voice	Key Advisor	Season 13	
2017	Home: Adventures with Tip & Oh	Herself (voice)	Television special	
2018–2021, 2023, 2026	The Voice	Coach	Seasons 14–21, 23, 29, 30	
2018	2018 Billboard Music Awards	Host	Television special	
2018	Hollywood Game Night	Herself	Red Nose Day special	
2018	Sugar	Herself	Season 1, episode 7	
2018	Pentatonix: A Not So Silent Night	Herself	Television special	
2019	2019 Billboard Music Awards	Host	Television special	
2019	Hollywood Game Night	Herself	Red Nose Day special	
2019–2026	The Kelly Clarkson Show	Herself	Daytime talk show; also executive producer	
2019	The Morning Show	Herself	Season 1, episode 4	
2020	America's Got Talent	Guest judge	Season 15, two episodes	
2020	2020 Billboard Music Awards	Host	Television special	
2021	That's My Jam	Herself	Season 1, episode 1	
2021	Kelly Clarkson Presents: When Christmas Comes Around	Herself	Television special; also executive producer	
2022	American Song Contest	Co-host	Season 1; also executive producer	
2023	The Rookie	Herself	Season 5, episode 12	
2023	12th NFL Honors	Host	Television special	
2023	Christmas in Rockefeller	Host, musical guest	Television special	
2023	Christmas at the Opry	Musical guest	Television special	
2024	NBC's Paris Olympics Opening Ceremony	Co-host	Television special	
2024	Christmas in Rockefeller	Host, musical guest	Television special	
2025	Songs & Stories with Kelly Clarkson	Host	Four-episode television special	

== Advertisements ==
List of advertisements, showing year released, roles and description
Year	Advertisement	Featured song(s)	Description	Ref.
2003	2003 MTV Movie Awards	"A Moment Like This"	Clarkson appears as Seann William Scott's dream co-host, which turns out to be Justin Timberlake	
2004	Oxygen	—N/a	Clarkson promotes the network on its "Watch it!" advertisement.	
2006	Proactiv	—N/a	Clarkson reveals her testimony about the benefits of using the product	
2006	Ford Motor Company	"Go"	Clarkson drives a Ford Mustang and announces a promotional raffle to win tickets to her Addicted Tour	
2007	NASCAR	"One Minute"	Clarkson performs and races at the Daytona 500.	
2007	Vitamin Water	—N/a	Clarkson is interviewed about her third album and upon drinking the product, she demonstrates a unique talent.	
2007	Ford Motor Company	—N/a	Clarkson promotes the company's "Warriors in Pink" campaign.	
2007	NASCAR Foundation	—N/a	Clarkson appears and the spokesperson for the fourth annual NASCAR day.	
2011	Toyota Camry	"Stronger (What Doesn't Kill You)"	Clarkson, Andrew Zimmern, James Lipton and Chris Berman, embark on a road trip while listening to the song in the car.	
2013	Pepsi	"Get Up (A Cowboys Anthem)"	Clarkson's song is exclusively used to promote the "Pepsi NFL Anthems" campaign.	
2013	Amazon Kindle Fire HDX Wrapped in Red	"Underneath the Tree"	Clarkson joins a family as they celebrate the holiday season by using the product to listen to her Christmas album.	
2014	Citizen Watch	—N/a	Clarkson overcomes the adversities of the music industry while wearing her watch.	
2020–present	Wayfair	—N/a	Clarkson helps people buy things for their homes.	
