= Greatest Hits – Chapter One (Kelly Clarkson album) =

2012 greatest hits album by Kelly Clarkson

Greatest hits album by Kelly Clarkson
- Released: November 16, 2012
- Recorded: 2002–2012
- Genres: Pop; pop rock
- Length: 63:42
- Labels: RCA; 19
- Producers: Max Martin; Dr. Luke; Rhett Lawrence; Greg Kurstin; David Hodges; Ben Moody; David Kahne; Jimmy Messer (co.); Ryan Tedder; Brian Kennedy; Ester Dean (co.); Dante Jones (add.); John Shanks; Michael Knox; Raine Maida; Kara DioGuardi; Stephen Ferrera; Steve Mac; Dan Huff; Sound Kollectiv; Thuy-An Julien

Kelly Clarkson chronology
iTunes Session (2011)	Greatest Hits – Chapter One (2012)	Wrapped in Red (2013)

Singles from Greatest Hits – Chapter One
- 1. "Catch My Breath" Released: October 15, 2012; 2. "Don't Rush" Released: October 30, 2012; 3. "People Like Us" Released: April 8, 2013

Greatest Hits – Chapter One (stylized as Greatest Hits • Chapter One) is the first greatest hits album by American singer Kelly Clarkson, released on November 16, 2012, by RCA Records. It contains material from Clarkson's first five studio albums: Thankful (2003), Breakaway (2004), My December (2007), All I Ever Wanted (2009), and Stronger (2011). Its three newly recorded songs, "Catch My Breath", "Don't Rush", and "People Like Us", served as singles; contributions to their production came from Sound Kollectiv, Greg Kurstin, and Dann Huff.

== Background and release ==
"It’s been a decade now since I won American Idol. Sometimes it feels longer because although it has been exciting that was a lot of pressure to have as a 19 year old girl. To own a company, lead an organization as a business woman, and be able to create music I’m proud of has been tough, but inspiring, for me. Thank you everyone that has been a part of my career and life. Here’s to another decade of passion and fun!"

— Clarkson on releasing the compilation album.

Clarkson was first approached on releasing a greatest hits album after releasing My December in December 2007, but found the idea appalling. She insisted: "Doing a greatest hits would be crazy. I am not 50. Artists who do one after three albums think their career is coming to an end." On September 11, 2012, the UK branch of Sony Music Entertainment revealed on a press conference that a greatest hits album from Clarkson would be released by the end of 2012. In an interview with The Insider promoting the release of her promotional single "Get Up (A Cowboys Anthem)" (2012), Clarkson hinted that she would release a new set of songs by the end of the year. On October 4, 2012, Clarkson announced that a new single from the compilation album, "Catch My Breath", would be released the following week. RCA Records later announced that the album's title would be Greatest Hits – Chapter One; the album was released on November 19, 2012, in the United States and was preceded by the release of "Catch My Breath" on October 16, 2012.

== Content and artwork ==
Greatest Hits – Chapter One contains seventeen tracks spanning ten years of music material from Clarkson's career, including a collaborative work with country artist Jason Aldean and three newly recorded tracks specifically made for the greatest hits album. "A Moment Like This", representing the oldest material on the compilation, is taken from her non-album single "Before Your Love"/"A Moment Like This" in 2002. "Miss Independent" is the only song from her debut album, Thankful (2003). "Breakaway" first appeared on the soundtrack of the Disney film The Princess Diaries 2 (2004). "Breakaway" also appeared on her 2004 album Breakaway, along with "Since U Been Gone", "Behind These Hazel Eyes", "Because of You", and "Walk Away". "Never Again" is the only song from her 2007 album My December. Tracks from her 2009 album All I Ever Wanted are "My Life Would Suck Without You" and "Already Gone". "Mr. Know It All" and "Stronger (What Doesn't Kill You)" both originally appeared on her 2011 album Stronger. "Don't You Wanna Stay" first appeared on Aldean's 2010 album, My Kinda Party, and was also included in Stronger. The remaining track, a cover of "I'll Be Home for Christmas", originally appeared on her second extended play, iTunes Session (2011).

The compilation features three previously unreleased tracks: "Catch My Breath", "Don't Rush" and "People Like Us". "Catch My Breath", an electropop song, was written by Clarkson along with her musical director Jason Halbert and Eric Olson. It was released as the first single from the compilation album. "Don't Rush" features the country artist Vince Gill. The international version of the compilation includes the songs "The Trouble with Love Is", "Beautiful Disaster", "I Do Not Hook Up" and "Dark Side". "The Trouble with Love Is" first appeared on the soundtrack of the Universal film Love Actually (2003), and also appeared on Thankful. The live version of "Beautiful Disaster" (originally from Thankful) also appeared as the final track from Breakaway. "I Do Not Hook Up" appeared on All I Ever Wanted and "Dark Side" appeared on Stronger. The deluxe edition DVD contains almost all of Clarkson's music videos including the accompanying music videos of "Low" and "Don't Waste Your Time" (which weren't included on the compilation). The photographic artwork for the album was shot by Canadian-American photographer Jill Greenberg, who was known for producing portrait covers of Time, Wired, Fast Company, and Entertainment Weekly. It also marked the first time Greenberg designed a phonographic cover despite photographing Clarkson back in 2002.

== Promotion ==
=== Live performances ===
Clarkson performed "Don't Rush" at the 46th Annual Country Music Association Awards with Vince Gill on November 1, 2012. On November 18, 2012, she performed a medley of "Miss Independent", "Since U Been Gone", "Stronger (What Doesn't Kill You)" and "Catch My Breath" at the 40th Annual American Music Awards. On November 20, 2012, she performed "Catch My Breath" on The Ellen DeGeneres Show.

=== Singles ===
"Catch My Breath"
The uptempo chorus of "Catch My Breath", the lead single of the album.

The compilation's lead single, "Catch My Breath", premiered on On Air with Ryan Seacrest on October 10, 2012, and was released to retail on October 15, 2012. It debuted on the Billboard Hot 100 at number 54 and peaked at number 19, becoming Clarkson's 15th top-40 hit on the chart. It also peaked at number 14 on the Billboard Pop Songs chart and at number 5 on the Billboard Adult Pop Songs chart. The second single, "Don't Rush", featuring Vince Gill, was released on October 30, 2012, exclusively for country music radio and retail, fifteen days after the release of "Catch My Breath". It entered the Billboard Hot 100 at number 97, eventually peaking at number 87, and at the Billboard Hot Country Songs chart at number 23. In January 2013, "People Like Us" was confirmed as the third single from the album. It was released to radio stations in the United States on April 8, 2013.

== Critical reception ==
Professional ratings
Review scores
Source	Rating
AllMusic	4/5 stars
Digital Spy	4/5 stars
musicOMH	4/5 stars
Slant Magazine	4/5 stars

AllMusic's senior editor Stephen Thomas Erlewine lauded Clarkson's transcendence from her American Idol image and her endurance throughout the 2000s, writing that "Consequently, Greatest Hits – Chapter One winds up sounding like pop sounded in the new millennium: alternatively calculated and inspired, a pop star who always seemed in control of her fate even when she aspired to be heard as bumper music in malls from sea to shining sea." Robert Copsey of Digital Spy opined that "the sailing has been pretty smooth for Kelly ever since, turning out big pop songs (courtesy of Dr. Luke and Max Martin) with even bigger vocals that are, for the most part, wholly reassuring." Philip Matusavage of musicOMH wrote a positive review, remarking: "Chapter One is a testament to Clarkson’s durability and she is one of the few artists to use such an ‘I’m still relevant, dammit!’ suffix whom you can envisage releasing a Chapter Two." Jonathan Keefe of Slant Magazine noted: "Clarkson's five studio albums have been a mixed bag, both in terms of quality and overall style, ranging from the R&B-lite of Thankful to the slick pop-rock of Breakaway and All I Ever Wanted. Clarkson has yet to settle on a distinct POV as an artist, but the smart sequencing of Chapter One downplays this limitation."

== Commercial performance ==
Greatest Hits – Chapter One debuted at number eleven on the Billboard 200 Albums Chart, selling about 75,000 copies in its first week. It has sold over 728,000 copies as of September 2017. It also debuted on the Swiss Albums Chart at number 92 on the week ending December 2, 2012. On the Japanese Oricon Albums Chart, the compilation debuted at number 80 on December 3, 2012.

== Track listing ==
No.	Title	Writer(s)	Length
1.	"Since U Been Gone" (from Breakaway, 2004)	Max Martin; Lukasz Gottwald	3:08
2.	"My Life Would Suck Without You" (from All I Ever Wanted, 2009)	Gottwald; Martin; Claude Kelly	3:32
3.	"Miss Independent" (from Thankful, 2003)	Kelly Clarkson; Rhett Lawrence; Christina Aguilera; Matt Morris	3:34
4.	"Stronger (What Doesn't Kill You)" (from Stronger, 2011)	Jörgen Elofsson; Ali Tamposi; David Gamson; Greg Kurstin	3:41
5.	"Behind These Hazel Eyes" (from Breakaway)	Clarkson; Martin; Gottwald	3:16
6.	"Because of You" (from Breakaway)	Clarkson; David Hodges; Ben Moody	3:39
7.	"Never Again" (from My December, 2007)	Clarkson; Jimmy Messer	3:37
8.	"Already Gone" (from All I Ever Wanted)	Clarkson; Ryan Tedder	4:41
9.	"Mr. Know It All" (from Stronger)	Brian Seals; Ester Dean; Brett James; Dante Jones	3:53
10.	"Breakaway" (from Breakaway)	Matthew Gerrard; Bridget Benenate; Avril Lavigne	3:57
11.	"Don't You Wanna Stay" (feat. Jason Aldean) (from My Kinda Party, 2010)	Jason Sellers; Paul Jenkins; Andy Gibson	4:20
12.	"Walk Away" (from Breakaway)	Clarkson; Chantal Kreviazuk; Raine Maida; Kara DioGuardi	3:08
13.	"Catch My Breath" (previously unreleased)	Clarkson; Jason Halbert; Eric Olson	4:10
14.	"People Like Us" (previously unreleased)	Meghan Kabir; James Michael; Blair Daly	4:19
15.	"Don't Rush" (feat. Vince Gill) (previously unreleased)	Blu Sanders; Natalie Hemby; Lindsay Chapman	4:02
16.	"A Moment Like This" (standalone single, 2002)	Elofsson; John Reid	3:48
17.	"I'll Be Home for Christmas" (iTunes Session Version) (from iTunes Session: Kelly Clarkson, 2011)	Kim Gannon; Walter Kent; Buck Ram	2:53
Total length:			63:42

iTunes Store bonus track
No.	Title	Length
18.	"Miss Independent" (Live from Wembley 2012)	3:54
Total length:		67:36

International deluxe edition
No.	Title	Writer(s)	Length
1.	"Since U Been Gone"		3:09
2.	"My Life Would Suck Without You"		3:32
3.	"Miss Independent"		3:35
4.	"Stronger (What Doesn't Kill You)"		3:41
5.	"Behind These Hazel Eyes"		3:16
6.	"Because of You"		3:44
7.	"Never Again"		3:37
8.	"Already Gone"		4:39
9.	"Mr. Know It All"		3:53
10.	"Breakaway"		3:56
11.	"Walk Away"		3:08
12.	"Don't You Wanna Stay" (feat. Jason Aldean)		4:15
13.	"Catch My Breath"		4:11
14.	"People Like Us"		4:20
15.	"Don't Rush" (feat. Vince Gill)		4:00
16.	"I'll Be Home for Christmas"		2:53
17.	"Dark Side" (from Stronger)	Busbee; Alex G.	3:45
18.	"A Moment Like This"		4:18
19.	"The Trouble with Love Is" (from Thankful)	Evan Rogers; Carl Sturken; Clarkson	3:42
20.	"I Do Not Hook Up" (from All I Ever Wanted)	Katy Perry; DioGuardi; Greg Wells	3:20
21.	"Beautiful Disaster (Live)" (from Thankful)	Matthew Wilder; Rebekah Jordan	4:34
Total length:			79:13

Deluxe edition DVD (music videos)
No.	Title	Length
1.	"Miss Independent"
2.	"Low" (from Thankful)
3.	"Since U Been Gone"
4.	"Behind These Hazel Eyes"
5.	"Because of You"
6.	"Walk Away"
7.	"Never Again"
8.	"Don't Waste Your Time" (from My December)
9.	"My Life Would Suck Without You"
10.	"I Do Not Hook Up"
11.	"Already Gone"
12.	"Mr. Know It All"
13.	"Stronger (What Doesn't Kill You)"
14.	"Dark Side"

Notes

- ^a signifies a vocal producer
- ^b signifies a co-producer
- ^c signifies an additional producer

== Charts ==
=== Weekly charts ===
Chart (2012–13)	Peak position
Australian Albums (ARIA)	20
Belgian Albums (Ultratop Flanders)	88
Belgian Albums (Ultratop Wallonia)	194
Canadian Albums (Billboard)	15
Irish Albums (IRMA)	21
South Korean Albums (Circle)	6
Japanese Albums (Oricon)	80
New Zealand Albums (RMNZ)	15
Scottish Albums (Official Charts)	12
Spanish Albums (Promusicae)	77
Swiss Albums (Schweizer Hitparade)	92
UK Albums (Official Charts)	18
UK Album Downloads (Official Charts)	21
US Billboard 200	11

=== Year-end charts ===
Chart (2012)	Position
UK Albums (OCC)	74
Chart (2013)	Position
UK Albums (OCC)	199
US Billboard 200	42

== Certifications ==
Region	Certification	Certified units/sales
Australia (ARIA)	Platinum	70,000^{^}
New Zealand (RMNZ)	2× Platinum	30,000^{‡}
United Kingdom (BPI)	Platinum	300,000^{^}
United States (RIAA)	Gold	728,000
^{^} Shipments figures based on certification alone.^{‡} Sales+streaming figures based on certification alone.

== Release history ==
List of release dates, showing region, label, formats, and catalog number
Region	Date	Label	Format(s)	Edition(s)
Belgium	November 16, 2012	Sony Music Entertainment	Digital download	Standard (88765-42275-2); Deluxe (88765-42280-2)
Netherlands	November 16, 2012	Sony Music Entertainment	Digital download	Standard (88765-42275-2); Deluxe (88765-42280-2)
Switzerland	November 16, 2012	Sony Music Entertainment	Digital download	Standard (88765-42275-2); Deluxe (88765-42280-2)
Canada	November 19, 2012	Sony Music Entertainment	CD	Standard (88765-42275-2)
Czech Republic	November 19, 2012	Sony Music Entertainment	Digital download	Standard (88765-42275-2); Deluxe (88765-42280-2)
France	November 19, 2012	Jive Epic France	Digital download	Standard (88765-42275-2); Deluxe (88765-42280-2)
Greece	November 19, 2012	Sony Music Entertainment	Digital download	Standard (88765-42275-2); Deluxe (88765-42280-2)
Hong Kong	November 19, 2012	Sony Music Entertainment	Digital download	Standard (88765-42275-2); Deluxe (88765-42280-2)
Hungary	November 19, 2012	Sony Music Entertainment	Digital download	Standard (88765-42275-2); Deluxe (88765-42280-2)
Malaysia	November 19, 2012	Sony Music Entertainment	Digital download	Standard (88765-42275-2); Deluxe (88765-42280-2)
Philippines	November 19, 2012	Ivory Music and Video	Digital download	Standard (88765-42275-2); Deluxe (88765-42280-2)
Poland	November 19, 2012	Sony Music Entertainment	Digital download	Standard (88765-42275-2); Deluxe (88765-42280-2)
Portugal	November 19, 2012	Sony Music Entertainment	Digital download	Standard (88765-42275-2); Deluxe (88765-42280-2)
Singapore	November 19, 2012	Sony Music Entertainment	Digital download	Standard (88765-42275-2); Deluxe (88765-42280-2)
Slovakia	November 19, 2012	Sony Music Entertainment	Digital download	Standard (88765-42275-2); Deluxe (88765-42280-2)
Thailand	November 19, 2012	Sony Music Entertainment	Digital download	Standard (88765-42275-2); Deluxe (88765-42280-2)
United States	November 19, 2012	RCA Records, 19 Recordings	CD, digital download	Standard (88725-49080-2)
Vietnam	November 19, 2012	Sony Music Entertainment	Digital download	Standard (88765-42275-2); Deluxe (88765-42280-2)
Argentina	November 20, 2012	Sony Music Entertainment	Digital download	Standard (88765-42275-2); Deluxe (88765-42280-2)
Brazil	November 20, 2012	Sony Music Entertainment	Digital download	Standard (88765-42275-2); Deluxe (88765-42280-2)
Canada	November 20, 2012	Sony Music Entertainment	Digital download	Standard (88765-42275-2); Deluxe (88765-42280-2)
Italy	November 20, 2012	Sony Music Entertainment	CD, digital download	Standard (88765-42275-2); Deluxe (88765-42280-2)
Mexico	November 20, 2012	Sony Music Entertainment	Digital download	Standard (88765-42275-2); Deluxe (88765-42280-2)
Spain	November 20, 2012	Sony Music Entertainment	CD, CD+DVD, digital download	Standard (88765-42275-2); Deluxe (88765-42280-2)
Japan	November 21, 2012	Sony Music Japan	CD, digital download	Deluxe (SICP-3715)
Australia	November 23, 2012	Sony Music Entertainment	Digital download	Standard (88765-42275-2); Deluxe (88765-42280-2)
Austria	November 23, 2012	Sony Music Entertainment	CD, CD+DVD, digital download	Standard (88765-42275-2); Deluxe (88765-42280-2)
Denmark	November 23, 2012	Sony Music Entertainment	Digital download	Standard (88765-42275-2)
Germany	November 23, 2012	Sony Music Entertainment	CD, CD+DVD, digital download	Standard (88765-42275-2); Deluxe (88765-42280-2)
Ireland	November 23, 2012	Sony Music Entertainment	Digital download	Standard (88765-42275-2); Deluxe (88765-42280-2)
New Zealand	November 23, 2012	Sony Music Entertainment	Digital download	Standard (88765-42275-2); Deluxe (88765-42280-2)
United Kingdom	November 26, 2012	RCA Records	CD, CD+DVD, digital download	Standard (88765-42275-2); Deluxe (88765-42280-2)
