= People Like Us (Kelly Clarkson song) =

2013 Kelly Clarkson song

Single by Kelly Clarkson

from the album Greatest Hits – Chapter One
- Released: April 8, 2013
- Recorded: 2012
- Studio: Echo Studio (Los Angeles); Crank Recording (Perth, Australia)
- Genre: Pop
- Length: 4:19 (album version); 3:45 (radio edit)
- Label: RCA
- Songwriters: Blair Daly; Meghan Kabir; James Michael
- Producer: Greg Kurstin

Kelly Clarkson singles chronology
"Don't Rush" (2012)	"People Like Us" (2013)	"Tie It Up" (2013)

Music video
- "People Like Us" on YouTube

"People Like Us" is a song by American singer Kelly Clarkson, from her first greatest hits album, Greatest Hits – Chapter One (2012). One of the three songs recorded for the compilation, it was released as its third and final single through RCA Records on April 8, 2013. Written by Meghan Kabir, James Michael, Blair Daly, and produced by Greg Kurstin, "People Like Us" is an uptempo pop song, with its lyrical content primarily dealing with themes of empowerment, acceptance, and assurance for the eccentrics, who were being dedicated to as "people like us".

Upon Chapter One's release, "People Like Us" received positive reviews from music critics, many of whom complimented its lyrical content and Clarkson's vocal performance. In the United States, it peaked on the Billboard Hot 100 at number 65 and has topped the Hot Dance Club Songs chart. It also charted on the Adult Pop Songs and Pop Songs charts. Internationally, "People Like Us" attained a top forty position in the national charts of Canada, New Zealand, Slovakia, South Korea, and Ukraine.

Filmed by Chris Marrs Piliero, the accompanying music video for "People Like Us" is presented in a predominantly monochromatic atmosphere and featured Clarkson portraying an undercover scientist who furtively escapes an experimental subject with a full colored appearance into freedom. The video has met with positive reception from critics, who complimented its visual treatment and compared it to the 1998 film Pleasantville. Clarkson has performed the song in limited live performances, premiering it on the twelfth season of American Idol.

== Production and release ==
Less than a year after the release of her fifth studio album, Stronger (2011), Clarkson began to record tracks with Greg Kurstin for a potential sixth studio album during the Labor Day weekend in 2012. She explained, "We're always working, I go overseas for awhile [sic] and when I come back it's the holidays. I wanna make sure I have actual time off, so I like to get ahead of the game." Kurstin had previously collaborated with Clarkson for Stronger, producing the songs "Stronger (What Doesn't Kill You)", "Dark Side" and "Honestly". She remarked, "He has this whole jazz background, brings kind of a cool element to pop music. The cool thing about it is he gets in the studio and he doesn't have a formula. It's like everything could change."

One of the three songs recorded for Greatest Hits – Chapter One, along with "Catch My Breath" and "Don't Rush", "People Like Us" was written by Meghan Kabir, James Michael and Blair Daly, with production handled by Greg Kurstin. It marked the first time Michael, lead singer of the rock band Sixx:A.M., had co-written a single for a pop artist, having previously written songs for rock musicians such as Sixx:A.M., Meat Loaf, and Papa Roach. On November 14, 2012, five days ahead of Chapter One's release, the song premiered online on Clarkson's YouTube channel.

== Composition ==
"People Like Us"
The 30-second chorus of "People Like Us", with synthesizers being prominently featured in the second half.

"People Like Us" is a pop anthem with a length of four minutes and 20 seconds, a radio edit of it omits a part of the final chorus. The track begins with a spoken word intro and opens into an up-tempo pop melody, with its lyrics mainly exploring the themes of assurance, empowerment, celebration for the eccentrics and outcasts, which were dedicated by Clarkson as "people like us".

The song is performed in the key of E♭ minor with a tempo of 128 beats per minute in common time. It follows a chord progression of E♭m–G♭–B♭m–A♭, and Clarkson's vocals span from D♭_{4} to E♭_{5}.

== Reception ==
=== Critical response ===
Andy Scott of Celebuzz also wrote a positive review, remarking: "the latest single from the Grammy-winning superstar is exactly what we've come to expect from her: infectious beats; uplifting lyrics; and a powerful chorus that reminds one of her past hits like "Since U Been Gone" and "Stronger (What Doesn't Kill You)". Multiple music critics also considered it to be a gay anthem. Zara Golden of VH1 compared the song's lyrical theme to Lady Gaga's "Born This Way" (2011), but also noted that "Clarkson is an old expert at spinning hope from hard times and this is the perfect final entry to Clarkson’s 'Chapter One.'"

=== Chart performance ===
Upon the release week of Chapter One, digital sales of "People Like Us" resulted in it entering the South Korean singles chart at number 14. Following its release as a single, the song entered the Billboard Adult Pop Songs chart at number 30 and on the Hot Dance Club Songs at number 32, and peaked at number 7 and number 1, respectively. It was Clarkson's fourth straight pop single to top the Hot Dance Club Songs chart and further extended her record as the top female solo artist on Adult Top 40 radio. It also debuted on the Pop Songs chart at number 36 and peaked at number 28. On the week ending June 1, 2013, "People Like Us" debuted on the Hot 100 chart at number 99, and peaked at number 65. As of September 2017, it has sold over 526,000 digital downloads in the United States. In Canada, "People Like Us" debuted on the Canadian Hot 100 at number 66, and peaked at number 28. In New Zealand, it debuted on the NZ Top 40 chart at number 37 on February 4, 2013 and peaked at number 25.

== Music video ==
=== Concept and synopsis ===
Stills from the "People Like Us" music video. The first (above) features Clarkson performing the song (as presented in color), it intersperses with black-and-white scenes of her portraying a scientist in a research facility with the girl in full color (below). Pilliero utilized color as a rhetorical device to distinguish the antagonists (in monochrome) from the misfits or "people like us" (in color).

The accompanying music video for "People Like Us" was directed by Chris Marrs Piliero. Filmed on April 9, 2013 at Mission Street Laboratories in South Pasadena, California, it utilizes a 2.39:1 anamorphic format (similar to "Catch My Breath"). A twenty-second preview of the video was broadcast on E! News on May 24, 2013, with the full video premiering on VEVO on May 28, 2013. The video utilizes several special effects shots, including the use of chroma key compositing and computer-generated imagery. In the video, Clarkson portrays a scientist breaking away from a monochromatic atmosphere and into a colorful one, accompanied with a young girl in full color.

The video, which uses the radio edit of the song, begins with a footage of Clarkson performing, alternating with scenes of her joining a group of scientists examining a young girl (played by twins Rebecca & Vanessa Rogers) in a research facility. The scenes in the facility were presented in black-and-white form, with the exception of the young girl being presented in full color to distinguish her in a drab, monochromatic world. Throughout the chorus, Clarkson furtively takes snapshots of the girl using a Nokia Lumia 920, an example of product placements used in the video. She then sneaks into the girl's holding cell and lets her wipe a part of her face, revealing a colored look. The two try to escape the facility while being chased by its guards. Riding in a red BMW Z4 while being followed, the two, Clarkson now in full color, drive through a tunnel with a bright light at the end. At the tunnel's end, the guards try apprehend them, but were stopped in flabbergast when other people in full color intervene and after discovering a world changing from black-and-white into color. The video zooms out to show a fractal landscape terrain and ends with a shot of Clarkson singing the last line, now revealing a full colored appearance.

=== Reception ===
The video received positive reviews from various critics, with many of them comparing the video's monochromatic treatment to the 1998 film Pleasantville. Emily Blake of MTV wrote that "Clarkson reminds her fans that differences really are what makes the world colorful." Courtney Smith of CBS Radio compared the final scene of the video to The Wonderful Wizard of Oz. She also wrote, "This sort of cinematic setting is nothing unusual for the director Piliero, although we've never seen him interconnect so many influences in one video before." Paul Duren of The Dallas Morning News wrote in his review, "The video is one of Kelly’s most creative ones, and with the most ads too. You can see Nokia and BMW getting the "in your face" treatment, but it really doesn't take much away from the video. All in all, the video gives a clear representation of the song and drives the point of the song home." Jayvee from The Round Table also pointed out a similar review, he wrote, "Aside from the insane amount of product placements (Nokia Windows Phone, BMW, etc.), which is new territory for Clarkson, the overall video concept and message behind the song is pretty damn cool." The video received a nomination for a MTV Video Music Award for Best Video with a Message at the 2013 MTV Video Music Awards.

== Live performances ==
Clarkson debuted "People Like Us" on the twelfth season of American Idol on April 11, 2013. It was later covered by the contestants as a group performance during the fourteenth season episode, "Evening with Kelly Clarkson."

== Formats and track listing ==
Digital download – Remixes EP

No.	Title	Length
1.	"People Like Us" (David Tort Remix)	6:31
2.	"People Like Us" (Johnny Labs & Adieux Club Mix)	6:59
3.	"People Like Us" (Fuego Remix)	6:13
4.	"People Like Us" (Baggi Begovic Remix)	5:44
5.	"People Like Us" (DEION Remix)	3:45
6.	"People Like Us" (Project 46 Remix)	4:38

Digital download – Single

No.	Title	Length
1.	"People Like Us"	4:18
2.	"People Like Us" (Fuego Remix)	6:13
3.	"People Like Us" (Baggi Begovic Remix)	5:44
4.	"People Like Us" (DEION Remix)	3:45

Digital download – EP

No.	Title	Length
1.	"People Like Us"	4:18
2.	"People Like Us" (Baggi Begovic Radio Mix)	3:30
3.	"People Like Us" (DEION Remix)	3:45
4.	"People Like Us" (Johnny Labs & Adieux Radio Mix)	4:01
5.	"People Like Us" (David Tort Remix)	6:31
6.	"People Like Us" (Fuego Remix)	6:13

== Credits and personnel ==
Credits adapted from the Greatest Hits – Chapter One liner notes.

Personnel

- Lead Vocals – Kelly Clarkson
- Backing Vocals – Ashley Donovan, Bryan Jones, Chris Dye, Chris Michaelessi, Chris Rodriguez, Einar Pedersen, Jill Pickering, Jim Fredley, Kate Rapier, Miles McPherson, Nicole Hurst, Robert Miller
- Engineering – Greg Kurstin, Jesse Shatkin
- Engineering for Mixing – John Hanes
- Assistant Engineering – Phil Seaford
- Mixing – Serban Ghenea
- Production, Programming, Bass, and Guitar – Greg Kurstin
- Production Manager – Jason Halbert
- Recording – Lee Buddle
- Songwriting – Blair Daly, James Michael, Meghan Kabir

== Chart performance ==
=== Chart ===
Chart (2013)	Peak position
Australia (ARIA)	46
Belgium (Ultratip Bubbling Under Flanders)	14
Canada Hot 100 (Billboard)	28
Canada AC (Billboard)	4
Canada Hot AC (Billboard)	7
Canada CHR/Top 40 (Billboard)	50
Global Dance Tracks (Billboard)	32
New Zealand (Recorded Music NZ)	25
Slovakia Airplay (ČNS IFPI)	35
South Korea International Singles (GAON)	14
UK Singles (Official Charts Company)	188
US Billboard Hot 100	65
US Adult Contemporary (Billboard)	17
US Adult Pop Airplay (Billboard)	7
US Dance Club Songs (Billboard)	1
US Pop Airplay (Billboard)	28

=== Year-end charts ===
Chart (2013)	Position
Canada (Canadian Hot 100)	94
US Adult Top 40 (Billboard)	39
US Dance Club Songs (Billboard)	18

== Radio and release history ==
List of release dates, showing region, release format, and label
Region	Date	Format	Label
United States	April 8, 2013	Mainstream Top 40, Hot AC radio	RCA Records
Canada	April 30, 2013	Digital download – Remixes EP	Sony Music Entertainment
United States	April 30, 2013	Digital download – Remixes EP	RCA Records
Belgium	May 10, 2013	Digital download – EP	Sony Music Entertainment
Denmark	May 10, 2013	Digital download – EP	Sony Music Entertainment
France	May 10, 2013	Digital download – EP	Sony Music Entertainment
Finland	May 10, 2013	Digital download – EP	Sony Music Entertainment
Italy	May 10, 2013	Digital download – EP	Sony Music Entertainment
Netherlands	May 10, 2013	Digital download – EP	Sony Music Entertainment
Norway	May 10, 2013	Digital download – EP	Sony Music Entertainment
Sweden	May 10, 2013	Digital download – EP	Sony Music Entertainment
Spain	May 10, 2013	Digital download – EP	Sony Music Entertainment
United Kingdom	June 30, 2013	Digital download – Single	RCA Records
Ireland	June 30, 2013	Digital download – Single	RCA Records
Austria	July 12, 2013	Digital download – Single	Sony Music Entertainment
Germany	July 12, 2013	Digital download – Single	Sony Music Entertainment

== Cover versions ==
In 2019, the song was covered in the episode "Danny Patrol" from the first season of the television series Doom Patrol, performed by Matt Bomer and Alan Mingo Jr.

== See also ==
- List of number-one dance singles of 2013 (U.S.)
