= Miss Independent =

Miss Independent may refer to:

- "Miss Independent" (Kelly Clarkson song), 2003
  - Miss Independent (video), a 2003 DVD album by Clarkson
- "Miss Independent" (Ne-Yo song), 2008
- "Miss Independent" (Maluma song), 2012
