= ITunes Session (Kelly Clarkson EP) =

iTunes Session

EP by Kelly Clarkson
- Released: December 23, 2011
- Recorded: November 21, 2011
- Genre: Pop
- Length: 63:33
- Labels: RCA; 19
- Producer: Jason Halbert

Kelly Clarkson chronology
Stronger (2011)	iTunes Session (2011)	Greatest Hits – Chapter One (2012)

Singles from iTunes Session
- 1. "I'll Be Home for Christmas" Released: December 2, 2011

iTunes Session is an extended play (EP) by American singer Kelly Clarkson. It was released on December 23, 2011 in Australia and on December 27, 2011 in the United States and the United Kingdom. In the United States, it peaked at number 85 on the Billboard 200; it has sold 17,000 copies as of September 2017.

== Singles ==
The EP's release was preceded by a Christmas single, "I'll Be Home for Christmas." "I'll Be Home For Christmas" debuted on the Billboard Hot 100 at number 93 for the chart dated December 24, 2011 with 24,000 copies sold. It also charted at number sixteen on Billboard Holiday Songs and at number 61 on Billboard Hot Digital Songs. It was re-released to AC radio on November 27, 2012. The song was later included on the deluxe edition of her first holiday album, Wrapped in Red (2013), as a bonus track.

== Track listing ==
iTunes Session track listing
No.	Title	Writer(s)	Length
1.	"Mr. Know It All"	Brian Seals; Ester Dean; Brett James; Dante Jones	3:33
2.	"What Doesn't Kill You (Stronger)"	Jörgen Elofsson; Ali Tamposi; David Gamson; Greg Kurstin	3:24
3.	"You Can't Win"	Kelly Clarkson; Josh Abraham; Oliver Goldstein; Felix Bloxsom	3:50
4.	"Never Again"	Clarkson; Jimmy Messer	4:03
5.	"Since U Been Gone"	Max Martin; Lukasz Gottwald	3:10
6.	"Why Don't You Try"	Eric Hutchinson	4:15
7.	"My Life Would Suck Without You"	Martin; Gottwald; Claude Kelly	3:08
8.	"I'll Be Home for Christmas"	Walter Kent; Buck Ram; Kim Gannon	2:53
9.	"Interview"		35:17
Total length:			63:33

== Charts ==
Chart performance for iTunes Session
Chart (2011)	Peak position
US Billboard 200	85

== Release history ==
Region	Date	Format	Label	Ref.
Australia	December 23, 2011	Digital download	Sony Music	
United Kingdom	December 27, 2011	Digital download	RCA	
United States	December 27, 2011	Digital download	RCA	
