= Get Up (A Cowboys Anthem) =

2012 single by Kelly Clarkson

- Original Pepsi release cover

Promotional single by Kelly Clarkson
- Released: October 2, 2012
- Recorded: 2012
- Studio: Pulse Recording Studio (Los Angeles, California)
- Genre: Dance-pop; synthpop
- Length: 3:46
- Label: RCA
- Songwriter(s): Kelly Clarkson; Josh Abraham; Oliver Goldstein; Ryan Williams
- Producer(s): Josh Abraham; Oligee

Alternate cover
- RCA re-release cover

"Get Up (A Cowboys Anthem)" is a song by American recording pop artist Kelly Clarkson. It was written by Clarkson and Ryan Williams, and co-written and produced by Josh Abraham and Oligee. It was originally released on August 13, 2012, as a free recording by Pepsi as part of their Pepsi NFL Anthems, an advertisement campaign with the National Football League to promote the Dallas Cowboys football team. It was re-released on October 2, 2012, by RCA Records.

== Background, composition and release ==
"Get Up (A Cowboys Anthem)" is a dance-pop song with a length of 3:46 (3 minutes and 46 seconds) with synthpop influences, which Clarkson developed upon the release of her album Stronger (2011) on songs such as "Stronger (What Doesn't Kill You)" and "Dark Side". The song has sampled crowd cheering sounds that can be heard within its dance beats. Clarkson, a native of Dallas–Fort Worth, Texas and a fan of the Dallas Cowboys football team, immediately wrote it the very same night she was invited by Pepsi and the NFL. She remarked: "Everyone knows that I am a huge Cowboys fan, and having the chance to be a part of the Pepsi NFL Anthems program and create a custom song for the team and city of Dallas overall was an honor." She co-wrote it with music producers Josh Abraham and Oligee, whom she had collaborated with previously on songs such as "Hello", "Alone", "You Can't Win" and "You Love Me". Clarkson revealed on an interview with The Hollywood Reporter that the Dallas Cowboys Cheerleaders inspired her in the writing sessions; she remarked: "The thing that inspired me the most was everybody knows the Dallas Cowboy Cheerleaders just as much as the Cowboys. So I wrote the verses from a cheer perspective. The anthem is in the chorus where everybody can sing along and have a good time. I am pretty pumped. I am glad it came to me so quickly. That doesn't really happen that fast, normally." The song was first released by Pepsi and the NFL on August 14, 2012 as a free digital download until February 2013. It was re-released on October 2, 2012, by RCA Records.

== Critical reception ==
"Get Up (A Cowboys Anthem)" was met with positive reviews. Katherine St. Asaph of Popdust remarked: "It’s pretty straightforward: the gloss-rock of All I Ever Wanted or Stronger, a chorus all about getting up and shouting about it, and Dallas Cowboys references everywhere. It’s like Usher's "Scream" if it were about legit screaming, not sexual screaming." Amy Sciarretto of PopCrush wrote: "The tune should amp up quarterback Tony Romo enough to complete his passes on the money. When she sings "Only Texas has it all," we believe her." Bradley Stern of MuuMuse remarked: "It's essentially the fun-loving companion to "Stronger (What Doesn't Kill You)", and maybe a bit of "Alone." If you just ignore all the cringe lyrics about lone stars and Texas and all the crowd noises (close your eyes and imagine that Kelly's in The Wild Wild West learning to lasso or something), it’s actually an amazing anthem."

== Track listing ==
- Digital download
1. "Get Up (A Cowboys Anthem)" – 3:46

== Charts ==
Chart (2012)	Peak position
Hungary (Rádiós Top 40)	38

== Release history ==
List of release format, release dates, and label
Format	Date	Label
Free download	August 13, 2012	PepsiCo, NFL
Paid digital download	October 2, 2012	RCA
