= Don't Rush (Kelly Clarkson song) =

2012 single by Kelly Clarkson and Vince Gill

Single by Kelly Clarkson featuring Vince Gill

from the album Greatest Hits – Chapter One
- Released: October 29, 2012
- Recorded: 2012
- Studio: Sound Stage Studios (Nashville, TN)
- Genre: Country; country soul; soft rock
- Length: 4:02
- Label: RCA, Columbia Nashville
- Songwriters: Blu Sanders, Natalie Hemby, Lindsay Chapman
- Producer: Dann Huff

Kelly Clarkson singles chronology
"Catch My Breath" (2012)	"Don't Rush" (2012)	"People Like Us" (2013)

Vince Gill singles chronology
"Train Wreck" (2012)	"Don't Rush" (2012)	"I Just Can't Help Believing" (2013)

Music video
- "Don't Rush (CMA Awards Performance 2012)" on YouTube

"Don't Rush" is a song by American pop recording artist Kelly Clarkson, from her first greatest hits album, Greatest Hits – Chapter One (2012). The song was released as the second single from the greatest hits album by RCA Records. It is also one of the three newly recorded songs for the compilation. Written by Blu Sanders, Natalie Hemby, and Lindsay Chapman, and produced by Dann Huff, it features country music singer Vince Gill on backing vocals. The song premiered on WSIX-FM radio station on October 29, 2012, and was made available for purchase on iTunes store on the following day. It was officially sent to country radio stations on November 15, 2012. Musically, "Don't Rush" is a country song with influences of country soul and soft rock. It is Clarkson's second country single as a main act.

"Don't Rush" received critical acclaim from music critics who praised its production for resonating the sound of country songs from the early 1970s and 1980s. Despite that, some critics felt the song is not as powerful as "Don't You Wanna Stay", Clarkson's country duet with Jason Aldean. It was nominated at various music industry awards, including a Grammy Award nomination for Best Country Duo/Group Performance at the 56th Grammy Awards. Commercially, the single enjoyed a moderate success in the United States, peaking at number 23 on the Hot Country Songs and at number 87 on the Billboard Hot 100. It is Clarkson's fifth country chart entry, and Gill's biggest country hit since "The Reason Why" in 2006. The song's first live performance was on the 46th Annual Country Music Association Awards on November 1, 2012. The song's accompanying music video is composed of the live footage from the Country Music Association awards which was directed by Paul Miller.

== Background and release ==
"Don't Rush" was originally written by Natalie Hemby and Blu Sanders in 2008. The idea of writing the song came from Hemby. She explained "My friend Blu Sanders and I were together, and he goes, ‘Have you ever met Lindsay Champan?’ And I was like, ‘Nope!’ Basically he was like, ‘Why don’t we write with her? She has an absolutely gorgeous R&B voice.’ He was like ‘Let’s get together and see what we can develop." Hemby also admitted that the song was written for Lindsay Chapman because the song's genre fit Chapman's musical direction at that time. She added, "It had an Al Green-ish feel with a '70s throwback kind of vibe, and that's kind of what we were going for with her sound." Once the collaboration was completed, the song was never recorded and Hemby said that it "just kind of fell by the wayside". Being a good friend with Clarkson, Sanders decided to take the initiative to send the song with a few other songs to the singer.

According to Clarkson, when she first heard the song in March 2012, she decided to put it on hold. She explained, "My goal as a singer is to capture the sentiment of a song and emote what the feeling is. I'm in a relationship and super happy, and I don't think I would have been able to sing this song eight months ago. Love should be celebrated, and this is a great description of where I'm at in my life. This is a couple's skate, not an all skate song." "Don't Rush" is one of the three new tracks (the other two being "Catch My Breath" and "People Like Us") that Clarkson recorded for her first greatest hits album, Greatest Hits – Chapter One. In an interview with Billboard, Clarkson expressed her excitement of recording the song, saying

People have been wanting me to release something specifically for country radio for years, but I didn't want to just release something that has a steel guitar on it [...] I wanted to release something I'm proud of, and we finally found that song. It's my favorite kind of country music; it's like 1980s, 1990s country music, that throwback, two-steppin' style. And I'm freakin' stoked I got Vince Gill to sing on it with me, so I win 'cause he's like one of my favorite people.

"Don't Rush" is Clarkson's second country single as a main act and her fourth overall. Her first solo country single was the country remix version of "Mr. Know It All". It is also her fourth country duet with other artists. She first collaborated with Reba McEntire on the 2007 country version of "Because of You", followed by a collaboration with Jason Aldean on "Don't You Wanna Stay", and another duet with Blake Shelton on a song entitled "There’s a New Kid in Town". The song premiered on WSIX-FM radio station on October 29, 2012. It was made available for purchase on iTunes Store the following day, on October 30, 2012, as the second single of the album. It received an immediate response from fans and an overwhelming demand from radio stations following Clarkson's performance of the song on Country Music Association Awards on November 1, 2012. The song was officially sent to country radio stations on November 15, 2012.

== Composition ==
"Don't Rush"
A 25-second sample of "Don't Rush", where Clarkson and Vince Gill's vocals are a layer of "soulful harmonies".

"Don't Rush" is a country song written by Blu Sanders, Natalie Hemby and Lindsay Dawn Chapman, and produced by Dann Huff. It features American country singer-songwriter Vince Gill. The song is set in a "drowsy, take-it-easy beat" which is composed of a layer of Clarkson's and Gill's soulful harmonies. The song begins with a breezy soft-rock tune. In the first verse, Clarkson sings "I see the way you’re looking at me / Baby know I’m feeling it too / We can just light up every candle / Move from room to room" which was ensued by the sound of Gill's guitar. As the song launches into the chorus, both Clarkson and Gill are heard singing "Stopping every minute just because you're in it/Wishing everyday was Sunday, you're right next to me/It's how it's supposed to be", a vocal chorus deemed as "slightly awkward" by Will Hermes of Rolling Stone. In the final chorus, the pair pauses before the key changes at minute three.

Jonathan Keefe of Slant Magazine praised the production of the song for its light-handed approach which resonates the early-'80s work of artists like Barbara Mandrell and Ronnie Milsap. Mark Blankenship of Logo also opined that the song "sounds like an easy listening hit from the 1970s or 1980s, with gently groovy music underneath a laid-back vocal." It is noted that the sound of Hammond organ is instrumental in resonating the vibe of early 1980s in the song. Zara Golden of VH1 called the instrumentation of the song as "bright and breezy" and remarked that it is more soft-rock-y than "Don't You Wanna Stay".

Lyrically, the song finds Clarkson taking her time in love, and crooning about praising her lover. Sam Wilbur of AOL Radio is contented with the song's central theme, writing "It's a simple, laid back love song that is a nice change of pace for Clarkson who, along with 'Catch My Breath,' is singing more about love and happiness, instead of break-ups and heartbreak."

== Reception ==
=== Critical reception ===
"Don't Rush" has generally received critical acclaim from music critics. Rachel Brodsky of MTV gave a positive review towards the song, writing "It's true – we're not totally used to hearing Kelly exploring her country side (though she is from Texas, so go figure), but judging by the vocals on "Don't Rush," we think we could get used to Country Kelly". Sam Wilbur of AOL Radio complimented the song for being "a feel-good track with a nostalgic, classic country feel". Billy Dukes of Taste of Country gave the song four stars and a half, writing "It’s difficult for a female vocalist to sound sexy without drawing criticism. Clarkson’s voice is a wine and roses romance, instead of the wanton yearn of a beauty in a too-short skirt. The original ‘American Idol’ may have found her niche." Michaelangelo Matos of New York Post gave the song three stars out of five and praised Clarkson for "getting completely into character" and successfully delivering the emotion of the song. Mark Blankenship of Logo complimented Clarkson for embracing her country side. Calling the song as "a good song", he concluded his review by writing "Even better, it’s a flirty, seductive love song, not a furious break-up anthem, which is a nice change after ten years of Kelly’s heartbroken rage." Chuck Dauphin of Billboard ranked "Don't Rush" at number eight in his list of Top 10 Country Songs of 2012, writing "One of the most luscious sounding love songs I have heard in a while. It's the definition of 'Ear Candy.' If you’re not in love, you'll want to be after hear it."

The song was nominated for Vocal Event of the Year at the 2013 Academy of Country Music Awards, Musical Event of the Year at the 2013 Country Music Association Awards, and a Grammy Award for Best Country Duo/Group Performance at the 56th Annual Grammy Awards.

=== Chart performance ===
Following Clarkson's performance of the song in the Country Music Association Awards, "Don't Rush" sold 41,000 paid digital downloads and debuted at number 35 on the Hot Digital Songs as well as at number 97 on the Billboard Hot 100 on the week ending November 17, 2012. The following week, the song jumped to a new peak on the Billboard Hot 100 at number 89. It also debuted on the Hot Country Songs at number 25 on the week ending November 17, 2012 and became Clarkson's fifth country hit on the chart, following "A Moment Like This", "Because of You", "Don't You Wanna Stay" and "Mr. Know It All". With "Don't Rush" debuting at number 25, it also became Gill's highest debuting song on the Hot Country Songs and it was his biggest hit since his song "Building Bridges", peaked at number four on the chart in September 2006. The song peaked at number 23 on the Hot Country Songs on the week ending November 24, 2012. As of March 20, 2013, "Don't Rush" has sold 215,000 paid digital downloads in the United States. In Canada, "Don't Rush" entered the Canadian Hot 100 at number 53 on the week ending November 24, 2012. On April 18, 2013, the song re-entered the Billboard Hot 100 at a new peak of 87, following Clarkson's performance on the ACM Awards. By May 2013 "Don't Rush" has sold over 346,000 copies.

== Live performances and usage in media ==
Clarkson and Gill performed the song for the first time on the 46th Annual Country Music Association Awards on November 1, 2012. Their performance earned positive reviews; Grady Smith of Entertainment Weekly deemed it as "smoky, smooth, soulful, and understated". Natalie Finn of E! noted that their performance of "Don't Rush" reminisces "Islands in the Stream", and welcomed Clarkson's venture to country music. Story Gilmore of Neon Limelight remarked, "The two stars dazzled by simply singing, and singing well for their performance. Kelly sang flawlessly alongside Vince as the country icon strummed on his guitar while adding smooth vocals." The song's accompanying music video is composed of the live footage from the Country Music Association awards which was directed by Glenn Weiss. On February 28, 2013, Clarkson took the stage to perform the single during the Country Radio Seminar concert. Wearing a T-shirt with the logo of Drug Abuse Resistance Education, she was joined by Jason Sellers who sang Gill's part. Clarkson also performed the song on the Academy of Country Music Awards on April 7, 2013, again with Sellers singing Gill's part.

== Track listing ==
Digital download

No.	Title	Writer(s)	Length
1.	"Don't Rush" (featuring Vince Gill)	Blu Sanders, Natalie Hemby, Lindsay Chapman	4:02

== Credits and personnel ==
Recording

- Recorded by Steve Marcantonio at Sound Stage Studios, Nashville, Tennessee; mixed by Justin Niebank at Blackbird Studios, Nashville, Tennessee.

Personnel

- Kelly Clarkson – lead vocals
- Drew Bollman – mixing assistant
- J. T. Corenflos – electric guitar
- Paul Franklin – steel guitar
- Vince Gill – background vocals, electric guitar
- Dann Huff – producer
- Tony Lucido – bass guitar
- Chris McHugh – drums
- Jerry McPherson – electric guitar
- Steve Nathan – piano, Hammond B-3 organ
- Justin Niebank – mixing
- Cherie Oakley – background vocals, electric guitar

== Charts ==
=== Weekly charts ===
Weekly chart performance for "Don't Rush"
Chart (2012–13)	Peak position
Canada Hot 100 (Billboard)	53
US Billboard Hot 100	87
US Hot Country Songs (Billboard)	23
US Country Airplay (Billboard)	27

=== Year-end charts ===
Year-end chart performance for "Don't Rush"
Chart (2013)	Position
US Country Airplay (Billboard)	94
US Hot Country Songs (Billboard)	95

== Release history ==
List of release dates, showing region, release format, and label
Region	Date	Format	Label
United States	October 29, 2012	Radio premiere	RCA Records, Columbia Nashville
Canada	October 30, 2012	Digital download	Sony Music Entertainment
United States	October 30, 2012	Digital download	RCA Records
United States	November 12, 2012	Country radio	RCA Records, Columbia Nashville
