= Behind Hazel Eyes =

Video by Kelly Clarkson
- Released: March 29, 2005
- Recorded: 2004
- Genre: Pop
- Length: 60:00
- Label: 19; Ventura Distribution; StudioWorks Entertainment
- Director: Donnie B. Gold

Kelly Clarkson chronology
Miss Independent (2003)	Behind Hazel Eyes (2005)

Behind Hazel Eyes is a video release of American singer Kelly Clarkson. Unlike Miss Independent, her previous video release, Behind Hazel Eyes does not include music videos from Clarkson's singles. It was originally released on March 29, 2005.

The collection features a documentary of Clarkson's biography and music career. It features a tour of hometown Burleson, Texas, and her elementary school where she first got on stage with a performance of Prince's "When Doves Cry". Miss Glenn, the teacher who first discovered Clarkson's singing, also makes an appearance. Clarkson also featured her previous jobs prior to auditioning to American Idol.

The video also features scenes of Clarkson attending the premiere of the 2004 film The Princess Diaries 2: Royal Engagement in Disneyland, a behind-the-scenes footage of the creation of her second album, Breakaway, and a short live performance of "Beautiful Disaster" from her album Thankful.

The DVD includes as well behind-the-scenes footage from Clarkson's single, "Breakaway", with scenes from The Princess Diaries 2: Royal Engagement.

== Track listing ==
1. Kelly Clarkson documentary
2. "Breakaway" (Behind the scenes footage)
3. The Princess Diaries 2: Royal Engagement world premiere
4. Clarkson camping
