= Thuy-An Julien =

Entertainment businessperson

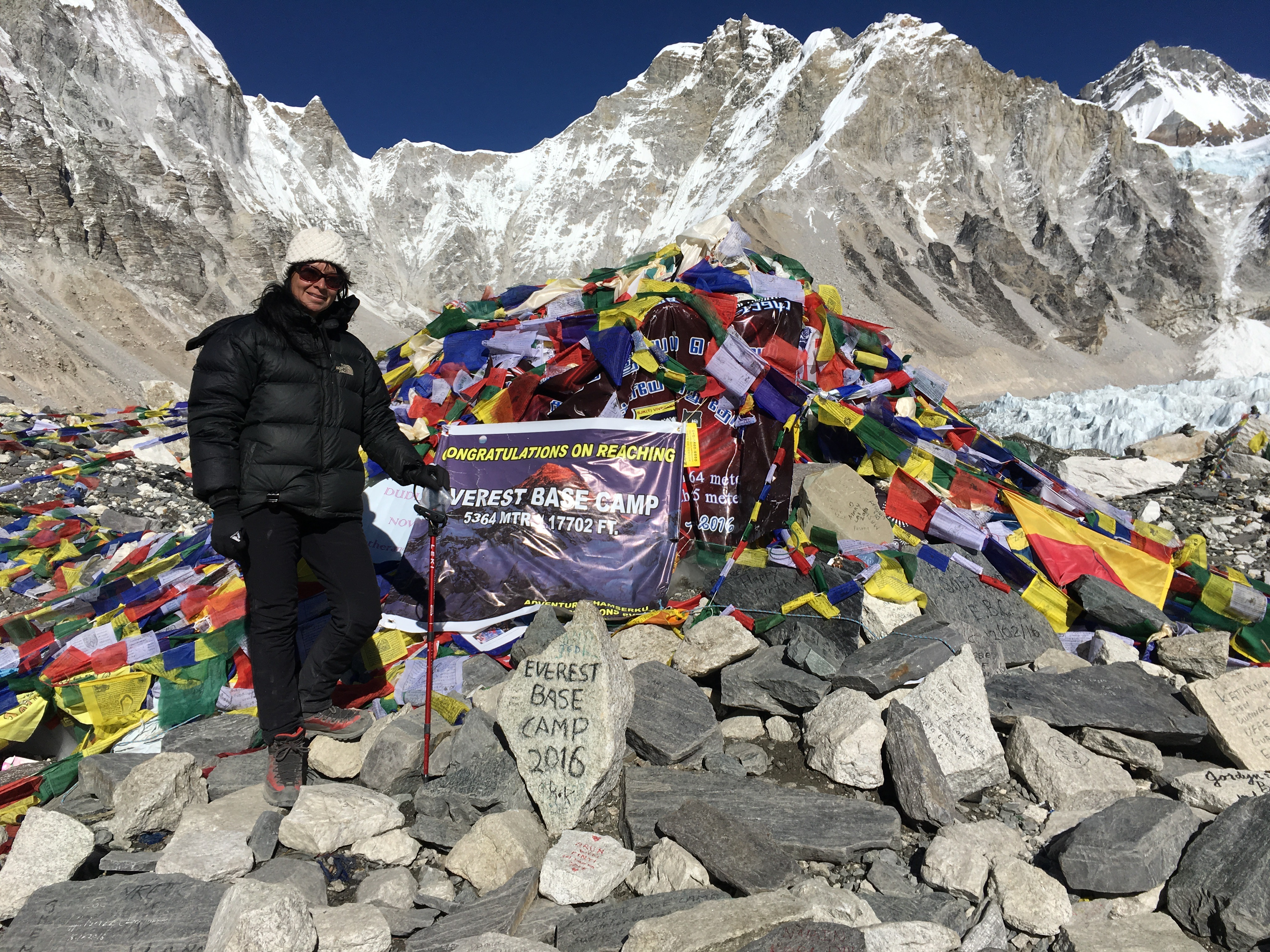
- Mount Everest Basecamp photo
- Born: Saigon, Vietnam
- Education: Computer Science
- Alma mater: University of Delaware
- Occupation: Music Industry Executive
- Years active: 1988-present
- Known for: Urban Marketing at iTunes
- Awards: Grammy Award
- Website: hartmanshouse.com

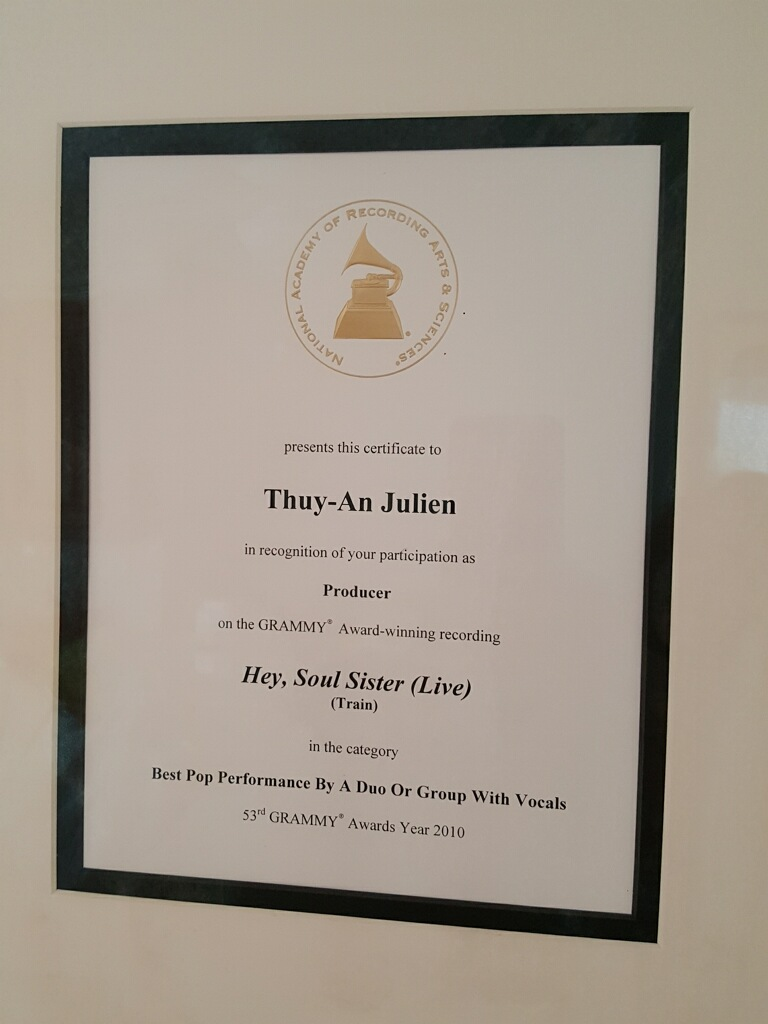
Grammy Certificate

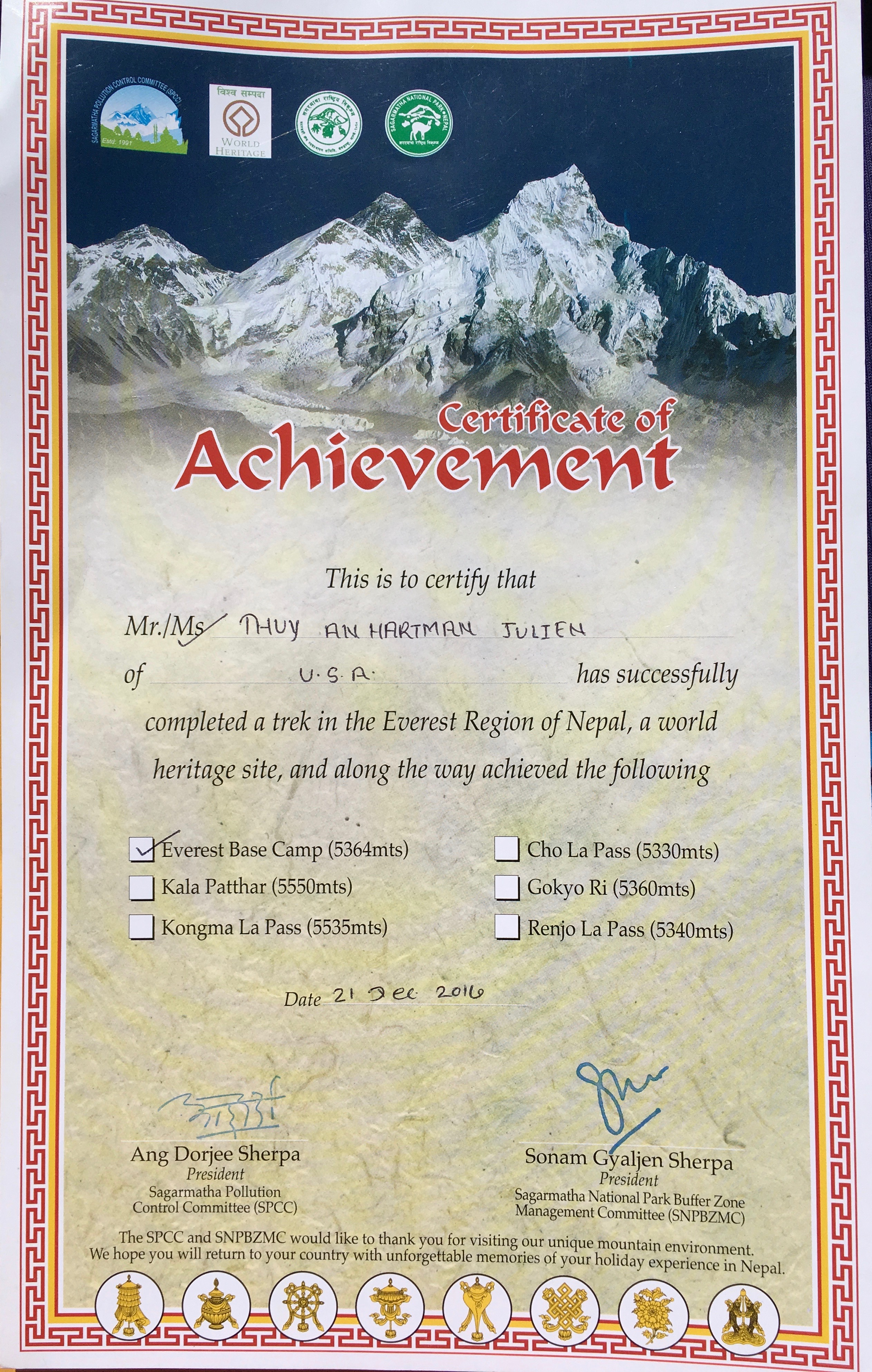
Mount Everest Certificate

Thuy-An Julien is a Grammy Award winning entertainment and technology executive. She has worked at companies including: Apple Inc., Time Inc., and Condé Nast Publications.

== Career ==
Julien is currently the Head of Promotions at UnitedMasters, an artist services company. UnitedMasters was founded in 2017 by Steve Stoute, a music and advertising expert, who helped develop the careers of Nas, Will Smith, and Mary J. Blige, and founded the award-winning ad agency, Translation. UnitedMasters is funded by Alphabet, Andreessen Horowitz, 21st Century Fox, and Floodgate.

Previously, President of HipHopDX, a hip hop media company and the CEO of Hartman's House, LLC, a management and digital consulting company.

Prior to HipHopDX, she was CMO, responsible for market and growth development at Dash Radio.

Prior to Dash Radio, she worked at Apple Inc. for 15 years and headed up original content brands in North America for iTunes. She was a creator, producer, partner manager, and strategic innovator. She played an integral role in the success of iTunes Store in multiple market segments, some she created, while significantly expanding others. She also created the Urban Marketing department—the first ever targeted marketing group at iTunes—to address missed opportunities in the focus of the original iTunes platform, originally designed only for mainstream music. The Urban Marketing department grew awareness of the iTunes brand in the urban community, and made iTunes more accessible to the urban audience via non-traditional marketing avenues. These strategies gave iTunes Store substantially increased sales to the urban audience. Prior to urban marketing she working with labels and artists to create new initiatives at iTunes and understand the new digital age of music.

Prior to Apple, she ran the technology for Time Inc., New Media as they forayed into the new internet era.

While at iTunes, Julien produced over 70 albums of original content.

== Education ==
Julien graduated from the University of Delaware with a degree in Computer Science with a minor in Psychology and Neurolinguistics.

== Awards ==
While working at iTunes, Julien produced the 2010 Grammy winning song "Hey Soul Sister" by Train. This was the first Grammy award won by an original content piece created by iTunes. The iTunes version won Best Song by Pop Duo or Group.

== Personal Achievements ==
In December 2016, Julien climbed to the Base Camp of Mount Everest (17,702 ft).
