= Miss Independent (video) =

Video by Kelly Clarkson
- Released: November 18, 2003
- Recorded: 2002–03
- Genre: Pop
- Length: 55:00
- Label: RCA; BMG; 19; S

Kelly Clarkson chronology
Miss Independent (2003)	Behind Hazel Eyes (2005)

Miss Independent is the first video release of American pop singer Kelly Clarkson. It is a collection of music videos, live performances, and behind-the-scenes footage detailing the creation of Clarkson's debut album Thankful. The home video was originally released on November 18, 2003.

The collection features the music videos of Clarkson's first four singles - "A Moment Like This", "Before Your Love", "Miss Independent" and "Low". The collection also includes the live performance of Clarkson at the first anniversary of the September 11 attacks at the Washington, D.C. Lincoln Memorial on September 11, 2002. It also includes three performances of "Miss Independent", a performance of "Low" on the 2003 Teen Choice Awards, a performance of "Some Kind of Miracle" at the 2002 Summer Music Mania, and her performance of "A Moment Like This" at the grand finale of American Idol immediately after winning the competition. Clarkson's performances of "Respect", "Before Your Love" and "(You Make Me Feel Like) A Natural Woman" from the American Idols LIVE! Tour 2002, filmed in Atlanta, Georgia and Washington D.C., also appear in the video.

Behind-the-scenes footage includes the making of the second single from Thankful, "Low", and Clarkson giving candid interviews detailing her life, dreams, and music prior to winning American Idol.

== Track listing ==
1. "A Moment Like This" (American Idol first season Finale) 3:40
2. "Miss Independent" (Total Request Live) 3:33
3. "Miss Independent" (The Late Late Show with Craig Kilborn) 3:32
4. "Some Kind Of Miracle" (Summer Music Mania) 2:35
5. "Low" (2003 Teen Choice Awards) 3:22
6. "Respect" (from the American Idols LIVE! Tour 2002 in Washington, D.C.) 2:21
7. "(You Make Me Feel Like) A Natural Woman" (from the American Idols LIVE! Tour 2002 in Atlanta, Georgia) 2:36
8. "Before Your Love" (from American Idols LIVE! Tour 2002 in Washington, D.C.) 3:59
9. "A Moment Like This" (Music video) 3:46
10. "Before Your Love" (Music video) 3:53
11. "Miss Independent" (Music video) 3:33
12. "Low" (Music video) 3:29
13. "Low" (Behind the scenes video) 8:01
14. "Low" (Photo shoot) 1:47

== Certification ==
Region	Certification	Certified units/sales
United States (RIAA)	Gold	50,000^{^}
^{^} Shipments figures based on certification alone.
