= Dark Side (Kelly Clarkson song) =

2012 single by Kelly Clarkson

Single by Kelly Clarkson

from the album Stronger
- Released: June 5, 2012
- Recorded: 2011
- Studio: Echo (Los Angeles)
- Genre: Synth-pop
- Length: 3:44
- Label: RCA
- Songwriters: Michael Busbee; Alexander Geringas
- Producer: Greg Kurstin

Kelly Clarkson singles chronology
| "Stronger (What Doesn't Kill You)" (2012) | "Dark Side" (2012) | "Catch My Breath" (2012) |

Music video
- "Dark Side" on YouTube

"Dark Side" is a song by American singer Kelly Clarkson, written by Busbee and Alexander Geringas, and produced by Greg Kurstin. The song was released by RCA Records on June 5, 2012 as the third and final single from Clarkson's fifth studio album, Stronger (2011). "Dark Side" is a mid-tempo synth-pop ballad that incorporates a vigorous music box melody with up-tempo beats in choruses, with its lyrics containing the theme of acceptance, recovery, and inner-beauty.

"Dark Side" has received generally positive reviews from music critics who considered the song as a good successor to "Stronger (What Doesn't Kill You)", Clarkson's previous single. Critics also praised Clarkson's vocal performance blending with the song's melody. It became her second consecutive song to top the Billboard's Hot Dance Club Songs chart.

The song's accompanying music video was directed by Shane Drake, who also directed "Stronger (What Doesn't Kill You)" and premiered on May 24, 2012 with positive reviews. It was nominated for a MTV Video Music Award for Best Video with a Message at the 2012 MTV Video Music Awards. Clarkson has performed "Dark Side" during several live appearances, most notably during the 2012 Billboard Music Awards and included the song as the opening performance in the set list during the North American leg of her Stronger Tour.

== Background, release, and composition ==
"Dark Side"
A 22 second sample of "Dark Side" by Kelly Clarkson

"Dark Side" was written by songwriters busbee & Alexander Geringas, and produced by Greg Kurstin. In an interview with Popjustice, Clarkson revealed that she had always desired to collaborate with Kurstin since finishing recording tracks for her sophomore album Breakaway in 2004. Jeff Aldrich, RCA Records' A&R executive, managed to get Kurstin to produce tracks for Clarkson's fifth studio album in 2010. Kursin took time to hear Clarkson's previous records before their recording sessions began, in which Clarkson felt made the recording "easier."

In July 2011, several of Clarkson's demos were leaked on the internet, including a demo of "Dark Side". The final version of the song then surfaced online a week prior to the album's release, although it was quickly removed by RCA Records and the IFPI. Clarkson subsequently published the song online to prevent the leaks. In an interview with New York radio Z100, Clarkson revealed that she was considering "Dark Side" to be released as the third single from Stronger: "I like "Dark Side" because it’s still got a beat to it, It’s a sweet-sounding song but with a dark lyric, and I like that." During the Canadian leg of her Stronger Tour, Clarkson confirmed to MTV News Canada that "Dark Side" will be released as the third single from the album. The song was already receiving early radio airplay in Sydney, Australia from November 2011, on the pop/rock show, 'Juice'.

"Dark Side" is a midtempo synth-pop ballad. According to the sheet music published on Musicnotes.com, "Dark Side" is written in the key of D major with a moderate tempo of 119 beats per minute. It follows a chord progression of D-D−G6/9−Em7b5/G, and Kelly's vocals span from D_{4} to F♯_{5}.

== Critical reception ==
Chris Willman of The Wrap remarked, ""Dark Side" cleverly reinforces the idea that Miss American Idol has a shadow side with a spooky music-box melody that cuts in every time the big beat and goth histrionics briefly cut out." James Dinh of MTV News described the song as "On "Dark Side," Kelly ventures away from her sometimes predictable scorned woman stomping grounds and closer toward her vulnerable side as she questions whether her lover will stick around even through the bad times." Entertainment Weekly also included the song in their "Songs for the Lovers (and Haters)" playlist article, remarking, "(Clarkson's) soaring synth-pop ballad defines what love's all about: knowing your girlfriend's a little bit crazy, and still not running away."

Joey Guerra of Houston Chronicle noted that "Dark Side recalls Clarkson's under-appreciated My December disc, a swirl of lullaby strains and goth-pop grooves. Think Katy Perry with a much, much better voice." Jason Scott of Seattle Post-Intelligencer remarked, ""Dark Side," takes Stronger and banks a hard left. With a xylophone tinkling out a lullaby-like intro, Clarkson takes a creative adventure into extraterrestrial territory that is an oddly soothing and intriguing fit for her voice. You did not ask for The Twilight Zone, but somehow with an electrically tender arrangement, Clarkson transports you there." He later described the song as "a crafty pop hook with Owl City influence that does not let up on skeletal drums, charts new territory for the Idol without venturing too far from the working formula." Jason Lipshutz of Billboard remarked, "On this thoughtful mid-tempo track, Clarkson dials back her vocal power on the verses and pleads with a guy to embrace her flaws." During her performance of the song during the VH1 Unplugged: Kelly Clarkson special, Kat George of VH1 remarked "In fact, this is what we love best about Kelly — that she’s just a regular girl. Acknowledging the pitfalls of her personality, Kelly invites us all to be imperfect without letting us (or herself) be any less perfectly loveable." Brian Mansfield of USA Today described the track's music-box intro as "nightmarish" and stated that the song "could wind up being a favorite song of psycho girlfriends everywhere, because it's a set-up." On March 5, 2013 Billboard ranked the song #70 in its list of Top 100 American Idol Hits of All Time.

== Chart performance ==
On the week ending July 7, 2012, "Dark Side" debuted at number 93 on the Billboard Hot 100. It peaked at number 42 on the week ending August 25, 2012. The same week, the song topped the Billboard Hot Dance Club Songs. "Dark Side" also debuted at number 36 on the Adult Pop Songs on the week ending June 16, 2012. Two months later, the song jumped from number 12 to number nine and became her eleventh top ten hit, marking Clarkson as the female artist with the most Top 10 songs in the chart, surpassing Sheryl Crow and Katy Perry. As of September 2017, "Dark Side" has sold 882,000 paid digital downloads in the United States. In Canada, the song re-entered the Canadian Hot 100 at number 85 on the week ending June 30, 2012, before peaking at number 41 six weeks later.

Internationally, "Dark Side" became a moderate success. Following its digital sales during the initial release of Stronger, "Dark Side" entered the Gaon Chart in South Korea at number 48. It also debuted on the UK Singles Chart at number 56 on the week ending June 10, 2012 and has since peaked at number 40 the following week. In Scotland, the song debuted at number 44 on the week ending June 9, 2012 before peaking at number 26 three weeks later. In Ireland, "Dark Side" debuted and peaked at number 42 on the week ending June 7, 2012.

== Music video ==
=== Background and synopsis ===
Clarkson comforts a bullied teenager on the music video. The concept of bullying is explored in the video.

The music video for "Dark Side" was directed by Shane Drake, who also directed the music video for "Stronger (What Doesn't Kill You)". It was filmed on April 28, 2012 in Downtown Los Angeles. Scenes of Clarkson performing in a downtown area were filmed underneath the 1st Street Bridge alongside the Los Angeles River. The music video premiered on May 24, 2012 on VEVO.

The music video mainly explores the themes acceptance, with sub-themes of bullying, drug and alcohol addiction also being explored. The video begins with Clarkson singing in a dark background. During the course of the video, scenes depicting people with their struggles in life (such as a man losing his job, a teenage girl struggling with her weight, a teenage boy being harassed and bullied, a girl who ran away, a beauty queen struggling with pressures and drug addiction, a stressed businessman with an addiction to alcohol, a forlorn war veteran, and a wife divorcing her husband) alternate with scenes of Clarkson performing in a black and green dress underneath an abandoned downtown bridge. As the bridge continues, the video then shows several pieces of footage representing hope (such as a blooming flower, a sunrise, a heart drawing, a rosary, a "Hope" signage, butterflies, and seagulls). During the final chorus, the struggling individuals depicted in the video now begin to smile. The video ends with Clarkson hugging them, inspiring assurance and confidence.

=== Reception ===
The video was generally well received by critics, with some noting its similar theme to the music video for Christina Aguilera's song "Beautiful". Byron Flitsch of MTV Buzzworthy remarked, "We'd be lying if we didn't admit that the video left us feeling a bit melancholy, but we're pretty sure that's its job. That and to remind us that a) that Kelly is looking more flawless than ever, and be nice to every single person in the world." Elena Gorgan of Softpedia noted, "'Dark Side' is simple and somewhat understated, which allows it to include so many 'stories,'(sic) each touching in its own right, each perfect to exemplify the beautiful text of the track." Amy Sciarretto of Popcrush wrote, "Clarkson mixes performance footage with socially conscious commentary and critique. But she doesn’t smash you over the head with a message. She's not soapboxing it. Instead, it's subtle and therefore much more effective, making the viewer think." Later adding, "The video eloquently shows that we all have dark sides, but that’s just one side and not the whole story. It doesn't make up a person's identity. Dark sides are just one of the many factors that make us who we are! No one is perfect and our flaws make us interesting. Clarkson helps us realize that with her smart video. Sarah Maloy of Billboard wrote, "Clarkson tackles demons of sorts in her new video for 'Dark Side.' As the singer showcases people facing drug addiction, alcoholism, unemployment, weight issues and marital problems in 'Dark Side,' Clarkson sings of how better days are to come." The Video was nominated in the category for Best Video with a Message at the 2012 MTV Video Music Awards however it lost to Demi Lovato's Skyscraper.

== Live performances and usages in media ==
Clarkson first performed the song during a Sony-sponsored special concert at The Troubador in Los Angeles on October 19, 2011 to promote Stronger. She then performed it as the opening song in the VH1 Unplugged: Kelly Clarkson television special on November 17, 2011. Clarkson also included the song as the opening performance of her Stronger Tour. Clarkson performed the song at the 2012 Billboard Music Awards on May 20, 2012.

Two days later, on May 22, 2012, she performed the song along with "Stronger (What Doesn't Kill You)" on the fourteenth season finale of Dancing with the Stars. On June 5, 2012, Clarkson performed the acoustic version of "Dark Side" in BBC Radio 1's Live Lounge. She performed the song on British daytime television show Loose Women. On June 9, 2012, she performed the song at Wembley Stadium as a part of her setlist of Summertime Ball. Clarkson performed "Dark Side" along with 'Stronger (What Doesn't Kill You)' on MuchMusic Video Awards on June 17, 2012.

The song was performed by Darren Criss (Blaine Anderson) on Glee's fourth season episode "Dynamic Duets", which aired on November 22, 2012.

== Track listing ==
France digital single

1. Dark Side - 3:44

Germany digital EP

1. Dark Side - 3:44
2. Dark Side (Maison & Dragen Radio Mix) - 4:03
3. Dark Side (Moguai Radio Mix) - 2:59

US promo CD

1. Dark Side - 3:44
2. Dark Side (Instrumental) - 3:44
3. Dark Side (Maison & Dragen Radio Mix) - 4:03
4. Dark Side (Moguai Radio Mix) - 2:59

US remixes

1. Main - 3:44
2. Instrumental - 3 :44
3. Papercha$er Radio Edit - 3:49
4. Papercha$er Club Remix - 5:56
5. Papercha$er Instrumental - 6:56
6. Moguai Radio Edit - 2:58
7. Moguai Vocal Club Remix - 6:20
8. Moguai Dub Remix - 6:13
9. Maison & Dragen Radio Edit - 4:04
10. Maison & Dragen Club Remix - 6:00
11. Ean Sugarmann & Timofey Radio - 3:42

== Credits and personnel ==
Credits are adapted from the liner notes of Stronger.

=== Recording ===
- Recorded at Echo Recording Studio, Los Angeles, California

=== Personnel ===
- Kelly Clarkson – lead vocals and background vocals
- Alexander Geringas – songwriter
- busbee – songwriter
- Greg Kurstin – songwriter, producer, keyboards, bass guitar and programming
- Jesse Shatkin – engineering

== Charts ==
=== Weekly charts ===
| Chart (2012) | Peak position |
|---|---|
| Australia (ARIA) | 56 |
| Belgium (Ultratip Bubbling Under Flanders) | 17 |
| Canada Hot 100 (Billboard) | 26 |
| Denmark Airplay (Tracklisten) | 5 |
| Germany (GfK) | 82 |
| Ireland (IRMA) | 42 |
| Netherlands (Dutch Top 40 Tipparade) | 19 |
| Scottish Singles Sales (Official Charts) | 26 |
| South Korea (Gaon Chart) | 48 |
| UK Singles (Official Charts) | 40 |
| US Billboard Hot 100 | 42 |
| US Adult Contemporary (Billboard) | 19 |
| US Adult Pop Airplay (Billboard) | 7 |
| US Dance Club Songs (Billboard) | 1 |
| US Pop Airplay (Billboard) | 22 |

=== Year-end charts ===
| Chart (2012) | Position |
|---|---|
| US Adult Pop Songs (Billboard) | 39 |
| US Adult Contemporary (Billboard) | 50 |
| US Hot Dance Club Songs (Billboard) | 9 |

== See also ==
- List of number-one dance singles of 2012 (U.S.)

== Release history ==
| Region | Date | Format | Label | Ref. |
|---|---|---|---|---|
| United States | June 5, 2012 | Mainstream radio | RCA | |
| France | June 11, 2012 | Digital download | RCA | |
| Germany | July 13, 2012 | Digital download | RCA | |
