= Stronger (What Doesn't Kill You) =

2012 single by Kelly Clarkson

Single by Kelly Clarkson

from the album Stronger
- Released: January 17, 2012
- Recorded: 2011
- Studio: Echo (Los Angeles, California)
- Genre: Dance-pop; electropop; pop rock
- Length: 3:42
- Label: RCA
- Songwriters: Greg Kurstin; Jörgen Elofsson; Ali Tamposi; David Gamson
- Producer: Greg Kurstin

Kelly Clarkson singles chronology
"Mr. Know It All" (2011)	"Stronger (What Doesn't Kill You)" (2012)	"Dark Side" (2012)

Music video
- "Stronger (What Doesn't Kill You)" on YouTube

"Stronger (What Doesn't Kill You)" is a song by the American singer Kelly Clarkson and the title song from her fifth studio album, Stronger (2011). Originally titled as "What Doesn't Kill You (Stronger)", the song served as the album's second single on January 17, 2012, through RCA Records. Written by Jörgen Elofsson, Ali Tamposi, and David Gamson, with additional writing and production by Greg Kurstin, "Stronger (What Doesn't Kill You)" is an uptempo song that draws from the genres of dance-pop, electropop and pop rock. Its lyrical content mainly explores themes of empowerment and recovery following a heartbreak, with the chorus inspired by Nietzsche's aphorism "What does not kill me makes me stronger". The song was positively received by music critics, although some noted the cliché nature of the title's phrase.

In the United States, "Stronger" became Clarkson's third song to top the Billboard Hot 100 chart. It held the number 1 position for three non-consecutive weeks, surpassing "A Moment Like This" (2002) and "My Life Would Suck Without You" (2009) as her longest-running number-one single on the chart. It also topped fifteen other Billboard charts, including Adult Pop Songs, Adult Contemporary, Hot Dance Club Songs, and Pop Songs charts, more than any other song Clarkson has ever released. Internationally, "Stronger" topped the national charts of Poland, Slovakia, and Slovenia and attained a top-ten position in over fifteen countries around the world, eventually selling over five million copies worldwide. Its success helped its parent album to sustain commercial longevity for over a year. "Stronger" merited consideration for several industry awards—including three Grammy Award nominations and a World Music Award nomination.

The song's accompanying music video was filmed by Shane Drake, which incorporates the theme of a global flash mob dance, featuring submitted videos of people dancing to the song. The music video garnered positive reception from critics who felt that its overall impact was exuberant. It earned Clarkson a nomination for a MuchMusic Video Award. With its continued success, she performed "Stronger" on several live award shows and television appearances around the world, debuting it during the first season of The X Factor (US) and performing it on the 37th season of Saturday Night Live, the 2012 MuchMusic Video Awards, and the American Music Awards of 2012. Clarkson also included the song in the set list of her Stronger Tour and on the encore set of her 2012 Summer Tour with the Fray.

== Writing and production ==
Originally titled as "What Doesn't Kill You", "Stronger (What Doesn't Kill You)" was written by Jörgen Elofsson, Ali Tamposi, David Gamson, and Greg Kurstin in September 2010. In an interview with American Songwriter, Tamposi revealed that the song was inspired by the Friedrich Nietzsche adage ("That which does not kill us makes us stronger") that her mother told her as advice. Although Tamposi found the phrase saccharine, she submitted it as an idea to Elofsson and Gamson during their writing sessions. Elofsson originally intended "Stronger" for Leona Lewis, who turned it down in the process. Tamposi's manager, Tom Maffei, then had one of his producers, Matty Trump, produce a demo track, later pitched to RCA A&R executive Jeff Aldrich, who gave the song to Clarkson. Tamposi revealed that Clarkson had also altered a lyric from the track. Aldrich had then commissioned Greg Kurstin, whom Clarkson wanted to collaborate with, to produce and add additional writing to the final version. Kurstin recalled, "I rethought the music part of it, I guess. It had a different tempo, beat, chords, and I kinda just came up with that guitar riff that goes into the verse, and that was the first thing that I kinda contributed just changed the feel of the song." The song's uplifting theme of empowerment led Clarkson to name her fifth studio album Stronger. Saying that it is one of her favorite songs in the album, she said, "Everybody loves the message 'What doesn't kill you makes you stronger.' It's a perfect representation of my life."

== Composition ==
"Stronger (What Doesn't Kill You)"
A 22-second sample of "Stronger (What Doesn't Kill You)" by Kelly Clarkson. The song features "rumbling guitars" and "electronic drums".

"Stronger" is a dance-pop, electropop and pop rock song, with a length of three minutes and 41 seconds. According to the sheet music published by Hal Leonard Corporation at Musicnotes.com, it is set in a common time and has a moderately fast tempo of 116 beats per minute. It is written in the key of A minor, and it follows the chord progression Am–F–C-G/B. Clarkson's vocals span two octaves, from G_{3} to G_{5}. The song begins with a "rumbling guitar" and a "shimmering synth" riff as Clarkson sings the opening line "You know the bed feels warmer / Sleeping here alone." Jason Lipshutz of Billboard noted that the guitar riff in the verses is reminiscent of Clarkson's "Since U Been Gone" which narrates an anthem of personal reinvention, and dancing. The bridges contain pulsating beats with synth and electric guitar that display some elements of electronic sound. During the chorus, the song explodes into an upbeat dance-pop number, complete with guitars and electronic drums as Clarkson sings "What doesn't kill you makes you stronger / Stand a little taller / Doesn't mean I'm lonely when I'm alone." Jonathan Keefe of Slant felt nobody else could sell the song's "ginormous chorus" better than Clarkson. Lyrically, "Stronger" explores the theme of moving on from an inimical relationship. In an interview, Clarkson remarked that the song doesn't refer to a specific person, stating "I didn't have a bad breakup or anything, I just think life is about relationships so I always write all about these different ones going on in my life. And I don't have a filter, so it's pretty verbatim." Jason Scott of Blogcritics felt that out of all tracks in Stronger, Clarkson's vocals are best and trendiest in "Stronger (What Doesn't Kill You)".

In an interview with MTV News prior to the song's release, Clarkson compared "Stronger" to "Since U Been Gone" (2004). She commented, "We've already rehearsed it, and it's so much fun. It's like this big dance anthem. That'll be the one [that's] kinda like "Since U Been Gone", [with] people jumping up and down to [it], and it's just kind of really inspiring, so I can't wait to perform that one."

== Release and reception ==
After returning from a vacation in Tahiti, Clarkson found out over 50 of her newly recorded demo material were leaked online, including "Stronger". She commented that the leak felt worse than being physically robbed. In an attempt to counter-attack the leakage, RCA finally debuted the song online on October 5, 2011, three weeks ahead of the album's release. An acoustic version of the song appears in Clarkson's second extended play, iTunes Session. The song was featured in a Toyota Camry commercial featuring Clarkson and other celebrities. "Stronger" was officially released as the album's second single to mainstream radio on January 17, 2012. A dance remixes of the song were made available on February 3, 2012. On February 17, 2012, it was released as a CD single.

=== Critical response ===
Jenna Hally Rubenstein of MTV Buzzworthy compared it to "Since U Been Gone," which has "a super radio-friendly hook." Elizabeth Lancaster of MTV Newsroom listed it as one of five key tracks in Stronger, writing "Upbeat yet soulful, the chorus will drag you up and onto the floor to dance the heartache away alongside her." Grady Smith of Entertainment Weekly thought that the song's "belty pop/rock wheelhouse" should please fans of the sound. He later added that "Clarkson might have been better off releasing "What Doesn't Kill You" as the first track from Stronger." Another positive reception came from Glenn Gamboa of Newsday, who praised Clarkson for "infusing her tales of empowerment after a breakup with her unique combo of vulnerability and sass." Jonathan Keefe of Slant thought that the song is "tailor-made for radio play" and that "the chilly electro-pop that Greg Kurstin brings to the verses, suggests a top forty version of Robyn's "Call Your Girlfriend" (2010). On March 5, 2013, Billboard ranked the song at number two in its list of Top 100 American Idol Hits of All Time. Additionally, it also appeared at number two of Clarkson's Top 15 Biggest Billboard Hot 100 hits through the week ending April 29, 2017.

Chris Willman of Reuters criticized the lyrics, commenting that "Never mind how tired that tune's titular phrase is. For a laugh, look up the YouTube video in which some wag mashed together a medley of 30 different songs that already borrowed "That which does not kill me makes me stronger" as a lyrical hook." Kevin Ritchie from Now Magazine emphasized that the lyrics are "about as clichéd as a mission statement can get, but it also makes for a solid pop song." Robert Copsey of Digital Spy gave the song four stars out of five, writing "The message behind her song may already be a well-worn, almost clichéd lesson, but as she continues to prove, there's little shame in coming out with the expected."

=== Commercial performance ===
In the United States, "Stronger" topped sixteen Billboard charts, marking career highs for Clarkson. Boosted by digital sales following the release of Stronger, the song debuted on the Billboard Hot 100 chart as an album cut at number 64 on the week ending October 30, 2011. It dropped out the following week before returning at number 99 on week ending November 20, 2011. Following its release as a single, "Stronger" re-entered Billboard Hot 100 at number 58 after Clarkson performed it on Saturday Night Live on the week ending January 21, 2012. On the week ending January 28, 2012, the song climbed to number 21, as well as debuting at number 38 on Adult Pop Songs. The following week, it became her tenth top ten song on the Hot 100 chart as it advanced to number 8 due to the strength of a number 11 to number 3 jump on Hot Digital Songs and vault on Hot 100 Airplay from number 71 to number 44. With "Mr. Know It All" (2011) having peaked at number 10 on the Hot 100, "Stronger"'s ascent to number 8 marked the first time Clarkson has had a string of consecutive top ten hits since 2004–2005, when she had four consecutive top-ten hits from her second studio album, Breakaway (2004). That same week, it debuted at number 30 on Pop Songs and at number 40 on Hot Dance Club Songs. On the week ending February 11, "Stronger" bounded from number 8 to number 2 on the Hot 100 as it topped the Hot Digital Songs chart fueled by 225,000 downloads, becoming her second song to top the Hot Digital Songs after "My Life Would Suck Without You" (2009). The following week, it ascended to the top of the Hot 100, becoming her third number 1 single in the country after "A Moment Like This" and "My Life Would Suck Without You". It held the top spot for another week, before descending to number 4 on the week ending March 3, 2012. That same week, it became her first song to top the Hot Dance Club Songs, making Clarkson only first artist ever to have topped the Hot 100 and each of the Hot Dance Club Songs, Hot Country Songs, Adult Contemporary, and Adult Pop Songs charts. The week after, it returned to number 1 on the Hot 100 for the third time, thus becoming her longest-reigning number 1 single in the United States. On the week ending March 24, 2012, "Stronger" became Clarkson's fourth song to top the Pop Songs chart and her first in six years. It also became her first song to top the Hot 100 Airplay on the week ending April 7, 2012, her fourth song to top the Adult Pop Songs on the week ending March 10, 2012, and her second song to top the Adult Contemporary chart on the week ending June 16, 2012. In its 2012 Year-End issue, Billboard ranked "Stronger" number 7 on the Year-End Hot 100, marking the first time Clarkson has had a Year-End top ten single on the chart in seven years since "Since U Been Gone" and "Behind These Hazel Eyes" (2005). Billboard also ranked it as number 1 on Year-End Adult Contemporary, number 2 on the Year-End Adult Pop Songs, number 11 on the Year-End Pop Songs, and number 35 on the Year-End Hot Dance Club Songs charts.

"Stronger" also outpaced its predecessor "Mr. Know It All" in the international charts except in Australia, Germany, Japan, Scotland, and South Korea. It topped the national charts of Belgium, Denmark, Poland, Slovakia and Slovenia and became her biggest hit in over 18 other countries, including Austria, Denmark, Hungary, Luxembourg, Portugal, New Zealand, Spain, Sweden, and the United Kingdom. "Stronger" is also her first single to enter the national charts of Finland, Brazil, Iceland, Lebanon, Mexico, and Portugal. In Canada, it debuted on the Canadian Hot 100 chart at number 64 on the week ending November 12, 2011, eventually peaking at number 3. In the United Kingdom, debuted on the Official UK Charts at number 21 on the week ending January 14, 2012, eventually peaking at number 8 for three non-consecutive weeks as her eighth career top ten single. The song performed better in Scotland, where it attained a peak of number 5. In Ireland, the song debuted at 40 on January 19, 2012, and ascended to number four. In Denmark, after debuting at number 11 on the Danish Singles Chart on the week ending January 20, 2012, it attained a top ten position at number 8 after two weeks. In France, the song debuted at number 187 and peaked at number 26, becoming her first song to chart in six years since "Because of You" (2006). In the Netherlands, the song debuted on the Single Top 100 at number 96 on the week ending January 7, 2012, and peaked at number 59. In Austria, it entered the Ö3 Austria Top 40 at number 27 and peaked at number 6. In Belgium, it attained a position on Ultratop 50 in Flanders at number 25, but failed to enter the Ultratop 50 in Wallonia by reaching only the top of the Walloon Ultratip chart. Elsewhere in Europe, it attained a top ten position in Czech Republic, Hungary, Luxembourg, and Finland; and a top forty position in Norway, Switzerland, Germany, and Sweden. In Australia, it peaked in the Australian Singles Chart at number 18. In New Zealand, it peaked on the New Zealand Singles Chart at number 4.

"Stronger" also marked career-highs in Clarkson's commercial performance. It became her first song to cross the 3 and 4 million marks in digital downloads, becoming her best-selling single in the United States and the United Kingdom. As of September 10, 2017, "Stronger" had sold over 4,954,000 copies in the United States. In the United Kingdom it sold over 546,000 copies as of April 24, 2016. The song sold over 5 million copies worldwide.

The song has been ranked 567th by Billboard on its 600 most massive smashes over the chart's six decades.

=== Award nominations ===
"Stronger" has been recognized with accolades from the music press. Entertainment Weekly ranked the song as the tenth best single of 2011. In December 2012, Popjustice ranked "Stronger" at number 1 on their "Top 45 Singles of 2012" list, stating that "this song is timeless in its amazingness" and claiming that no one "but Kelly Clarkson who could have pulled off this tune." The song's music video was nominated for Best International Artist Video at the 2012 MuchMusic Video Awards. At the 2012 Teen Choice Awards, the song received two nominations, Choice Single by a Female Artist and Choice Break-Up Song. "Stronger" received three Grammy Award nominations for Record of the Year, Song of the Year, and Best Pop Solo Performance at the 55th ceremony.

== Music video ==
=== Concept and synopsis ===
Clarkson standing in the middle of a flash mob crowd.

On November 21, 2011, Clarkson announced on her website that she wanted to incorporate a global flash mob into the accompanying music video of "Stronger". She posted: "I'm shooting my video for "What Doesn't Kill You" and I'd like everyone to join me in my global flash mob! Check out the routine in the video below. Learn it with me and get your cameras ready to record you and your friends rocking these moves in a unique location that shows where you are in the world. Submit your clip using the form below and maybe you'll see it in my music video!! I can't wait to see your submissions. Remember to be creative, but keep it safe and legal! Thanks for participating!"

The music video premiered on VEVO on December 14, 2011. Directed by Shane Drake, the video begins with Clarkson in a video control room, watching select flash mob videos submitted by various participants in different monitors. Throughout the video, scenes of Clarkson performing the song in three different settings (alone in a stage, with her band in a garden square, and in the control room) alternate with various flash mob videos. Towards the end of the video, Clarkson, along with the people in the garden square, forms a flash mob featuring a same choreography.

=== Reception ===
Critical reception towards the accompanying music video was positive. Prior to its release, Jenna Halley Rubenstein of MTV Buzzworthy predicted that the video would depict women who triumphed over broken relationships as a homage to self-sufficiency. However, she praised the different treatment of the video, complimenting the synchronized dancing and thought that Clarkson kept it classy. Leah Collins of The Vancouver Sun interpreted that the video depicts Clarkson developing a sense of strength and endurance as well as an ability to lead a large-scale dance routine after surviving a trauma. Erin Strecker of Entertainment Weekly enjoyed Clarkson's goofy expressions and perceived the video as "Since U Been Gone" round two. Rand Duren of The Dallas Morning News also reiterated that the music video is a reminiscent of "Since U Been Gone" and that it was great seeing more dancing and movement from Clarkson. Contessa Gayles of AOL.com described the song as "powerful" and "uplifting" and she believed that the music video did the song justice. Trent Maynard of 4Music had a positive response towards the video and deemed Clarkson's look as properly fit in the video. He concluded his review writing, "Nobody has a sense of humor quite like the original American Idol. Oh Kelly, you're the best." The video placed fourth for VH1's Top 20 Videos of the Year for 2012.

== Live performances ==
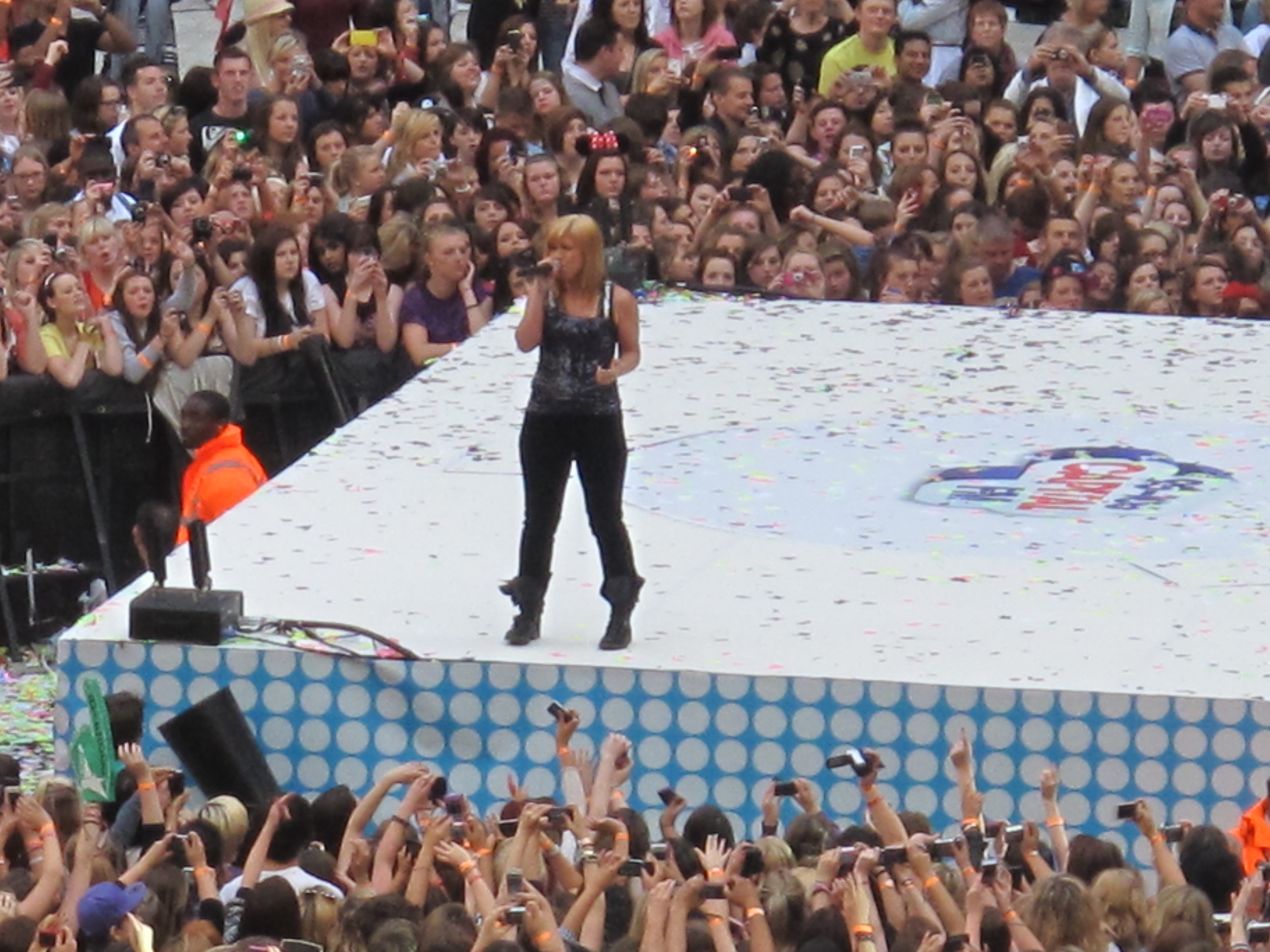
Clarkson performing the song at Wembley Stadium in London, United Kingdom, June 2012

Clarkson first performed "Stronger" in live concerts, she first performed it in a Sony-sponsored concert held at The Troubador in Los Angeles on October 19, 2011. On November 9, 2011, she performed the song at Z100's annual Jingle Ball concert at Madison Square Garden. She also performed an acoustic version the song on the VH1 Unplugged: Kelly Clarkson special which premiered on VH1 on November 18, 2011. "Stronger" has been performed prominently in her fourth headlining tour, the Stronger Tour.

Clarkson also promoted "Stronger" in live television events, the first live televised performance of the song was on November 23, 2011, during The X Factor (US) results show. On December 18, 2011, she performed the song on VH1 Divas Celebrates Soul television special. On January 7, 2012, she performed it along with "Mr. Know It All" on the 37th season of Saturday Night Live. On June 6, 2012, Clarkson performed it on the British television series This Morning. Clarkson also performed a medley of the "Stronger" with the succeeding single "Dark Side" on various television events, such as at the season finale of the fourteenth season of Dancing with the Stars on May 22, 2012, and at the 2012 MuchMusic Video Awards on June 17, 2012. On June 8, 2018, Clarkson performed it on Today.

== Cover versions ==
Amber Riley, Naya Rivera, and Heather Morris performed the song in the season three episode of Glee, "On My Way", which aired on February 21, 2012. Raymund Flandez of The Wall Street Journal described the trio's performance as "fine, fierce and fabulous." Their version of "Stronger" debuted on the Hot 100 at number 66 on the week ending March 3, 2012 as "What Doesn't Kill You (Stronger)".

On March 22, 2012, it was first performed by Diandra Flores on the sixth season of the Finnish television series Idols. On April 11, 2012, it was covered by Hollie Cavanagh, Joshua Ledet and Jessica Sanchez in the eleventh season of American Idol. On May 12, 2012, it was performed by Joelle Moses after will.i.am's recommendation on the first series of The Voice UK.

Clarkson also performed the song with Jordan Meredith on the television series Duets, where she is also a mentor. On March 16, 2012, the song was performed by various participants during the season finale of the fifth season of the Danish television series X Factor. On October 28, 2013, Tessanne Chin covered the song on Season 5 of NBC's singing competition, The Voice for her performance in the Knockout round vs. Ashley DuBose (who performed "Hey, Soul Sister" by Train).

In 2018, Dove Cameron and China Anne McClain recorded a version with slightly altered lyrics for Disney's Descendants franchise.

In 2020, Anastacia covered the song for the compilation album Goodnight Songs for Rebel Girls.

== Formats and track listing ==
Digital download – single

No.	Title	Length
1.	"Stronger (What Doesn't Kill You)"	3:42
2.	"Stronger (What Doesn't Kill You)" (Nicky Romero Radio Mix)	3:42
3.	"Mr. Know It All" (Billionaire Remix)	3:12
4.	"Mr. Know It All" (DJ Kue Remix)	3:56

Digital download – EP

No.	Title	Length
1.	"Stronger (What Doesn't Kill You)"	3:42
2.	"Stronger (What Doesn't Kill You)" (Nicky Romero Radio Mix)	3:40
3.	"Stronger (What Doesn't Kill You)" (Project 46 Radio Edit)	3:25
4.	"Stronger (What Doesn't Kill You)" (Promise Land Remix)	3:19
5.	"Mr. Know It All" (Billionaire Remix)	6:56
6.	"Mr. Know It All" (DJ Kue Remix)	5:36

Digital download – The Remixes

No.	Title	Length
1.	"Stronger (What Doesn't Kill You)" (Nicky Romero Club Mix)	5:52
2.	"Stronger (What Doesn't Kill You)" (Project 46 Remix)	5:10
3.	"Stronger (What Doesn't Kill You)" (Promise Land Remix)	6:34
4.	"Stronger (What Doesn't Kill You)" (Genetix Remix)	4:40
5.	"Stronger (What Doesn't Kill You)" (Papercha$er Remix)	6:56
6.	"Stronger (What Doesn't Kill You)" (Futurecop! Club Remix)	5:01
7.	"Stronger (What Doesn't Kill You)" (7th Heaven Club Mix)	7:28
8.	"Stronger (What Doesn't Kill You)" (Hotline's Miami Vice Club Remix)	5:48

CD – single

No.	Title	Length
1.	"Stronger (What Doesn't Kill You)"	3:35
2.	"Stronger (What Doesn't Kill You)" (Nicky Romero Radio Mix)	3:40

== Credits and personnel ==
Credits adapted from Stronger liner notes.

Recording

- Recorded at Echo Recording Studio, Los Angeles, California

Personnel

- Kelly Clarkson – background vocals, lead vocals, songwriter
- Greg Kurstin - background vocals
- Ali Tamposi – songwriter
- David Gamson – songwriter
- Greg Kurstin – songwriter, producer, keyboards, bass, guitar and programming
- Jörgen Elofsson – songwriter
- Jesse Shatkin – engineering

== In other media ==
The song was briefly featured in the film Final Destination Bloodlines.

== Charts ==
=== Weekly charts ===
Weekly chart performance for "Stronger (What Doesn't Kill You)"
Chart (2011–2025)	Peak position
Australia (ARIA)	18
Austria (Ö3 Austria Top 40)	6
Belgium (Ultratop 50 Flanders)	25
Belgium (Ultratip Bubbling Under Wallonia)	1
Brazil (Billboard Hot 100 Airplay)	84
Canada Hot 100 (Billboard)	3
Canada AC (Billboard)	2
Canada CHR/Top 40 (Billboard)	4
Canada Hot AC (Billboard)	1
CIS Airplay (TopHit)	5
Czech Republic Airplay (ČNS IFPI)	4
Denmark (Tracklisten)	8
Denmark Airplay (Tracklisten)	1
Estonia Airplay (TopHit)	104
Finland (Suomen virallinen lista)	10
Euro Digital Song Sales (Billboard)	9
France (SNEP)	20
Germany (GfK)	27
Global Dance Tracks (Billboard)	24
Hungary (Rádiós Top 40)	4
Hungary (Single Top 40)	3
Iceland (Tónlist)	26
Ireland (IRMA)	4
Israel International Airplay (Media Forest)	9
Japan (Japan Hot 100 Airplay)	96
Japan Adult Contemporary (Billboard)	32
Lebanon Airplay (Lebanese Top 20)	6
Luxembourg Digital Song Sales (Billboard)	5
Mexico Inglés (Billboard)	4
Mexico Top Inglés (Monitor Latino)	11
Netherlands (Dutch Top 40 Tipparade)	9
Netherlands (Single Top 100)	59
Norway (VG-lista)	17
New Zealand (Recorded Music NZ)	4
Poland Airplay (ZPAV)	1
Portugal Digital Songs (Billboard)	6
Russia Airplay (TopHit)	4
Scottish Singles Sales (Official Charts)	5
Slovakia Airplay (ČNS IFPI)	1
Slovenia (SloTop50)	1
South Korea (Gaon)	79
Spain (Promusicae)	9
Sweden (Sverigetopplistan)	30
Switzerland (Schweizer Hitparade)	18
Ukraine Airplay (TopHit)	10
UK Singles (Official Charts)	8
US Billboard Hot 100	1
US Adult Contemporary (Billboard)	1
US Adult Pop Airplay (Billboard)	1
US Dance Club Songs (Billboard)	1
US Dance Airplay (Billboard)	7
US Hot Latin Songs (Billboard)	45
US Pop Airplay (Billboard)	1
US Rhythmic Airplay (Billboard)	34

=== Monthly charts ===
Monthly chart performance for "Stronger (What Doesn't Kill You)"
Chart (2012)	Peak position
CIS Airplay (TopHit)	6
Russia Airplay (TopHit)	6
Ukraine Airplay (TopHit)	10

=== Year-end charts ===
2012 year-end chart performance for "Stronger (What Doesn't Kill You)"
Chart (2012)	Position
Australia (ARIA)	99
Austria (Ö3 Austria Top 75)	50
Belgium (Ultratop 100 Flanders)	99
Brazil (Crowley)	82
Canada (Canadian Hot 100)	10
CIS Airplay (TopHit)	14
Denmark (Tracklisten)	31
Finland (Suomen virallinen lista)	14
France (SNEP)	102
Hungary (Rádiós Top 100)	16
Poland (Polish Airplay Top 10)	9
Russia Airplay (TopHit)	15
Spain (PROMUSICAE)	34
Sweden (DigiListan)	53
Sweden (Sverigetopplistan)	97
Switzerland (Schweizer Hitparade)	62
Ukraine Airplay (TopHit)	18
UK Singles (Official Charts Company)	36
US Billboard Hot 100	7
US Adult Top 40 (Billboard)	2
US Adult Contemporary (Billboard)	1
US Hot Dance Club Songs (Billboard)	35
US Dance/Mix Show Airplay (Billboard)	41
US Mainstream Top 40 (Billboard)	11

Chart (2013)	Position
Slovenia (SloTop50)	21
US Adult Contemporary (Billboard)	27

Chart (2022)	Position
South Korea (Circle)	159

Chart (2024)	Position
Estonia Airplay (TopHit)	193

=== Decade-end charts ===
10s Decade-end chart performance for "Stronger (What Doesn't Kill You)"
Chart (2010–2019)	Position
Ukrainian Airplay (TopHit)	187
US Billboard Hot 100	85

== Certifications and sales ==
Region	Certification	Certified units/sales
Australia (ARIA)	3× Platinum	210,000^{^}
Austria (IFPI Austria)	Gold	15,000^{*}
Canada (Music Canada)	Platinum	80,000^{*}
Denmark (IFPI Danmark)	Gold	15,000^{^}
Finland	—	4,429
Mexico (AMPROFON)	Gold	30,000^{*}
New Zealand (RMNZ)	3× Platinum	90,000^{‡}
Norway (IFPI Norway)	Gold	5,000^{*}
Spain (Promusicae)	Gold	30,000^{‡}
Sweden (GLF)	Platinum	40,000^{‡}
United Kingdom (BPI)	2× Platinum	1,200,000^{‡}
United States (RIAA)	7× Platinum	7,000,000^{‡}
Streaming
Denmark (IFPI Danmark)	Platinum	900,000^{†}
^{*} Sales figures based on certification alone.^{^} Shipments figures based on certification alone.^{‡} Sales+streaming figures based on certification alone.^{†} Streaming-only figures based on certification alone.

== Release and radio history ==
Region	Date	Label	Format
United States	January 17, 2012	RCA Records	Hot Adult Contemporary Radio
United States	February 3, 2012	RCA Records	Digital download – The Remixes
Australia	February 3, 2012	Sony Music Entertainment	Digital download – EP
Canada	February 3, 2012	Sony Music Entertainment	Digital download – EP
Italy	February 3, 2012	Sony Music Entertainment	Digital download – EP
Poland	February 3, 2012	Sony Music Entertainment	Digital download – EP
Portugal	February 3, 2012	Sony Music Entertainment	Digital download – EP
Sweden	February 3, 2012	Sony Music Entertainment	Digital download – EP
Spain	February 3, 2012	Sony Music Entertainment	Digital download – EP
Switzerland	February 3, 2012	Sony Music Entertainment	Digital download – EP
Belgium	February 3, 2012	Sony Music Entertainment	Digital download – The Remixes and EP
Mexico	February 3, 2012	Sony Music Entertainment	Digital download – The Remixes and EP
Netherlands	February 3, 2012	Sony Music Entertainment	Digital download – The Remixes and EP
Norway	February 3, 2012	Sony Music Entertainment	Digital download – The Remixes
France	February 3, 2012	Jive Epic Group	Digital download
United Kingdom	February 3, 2012	RCA Records	Digital download
Finland	February 6, 2012	Sony Music Entertainment	Digital download
Germany	February 17, 2012	Sony Music Entertainment	CD single
Austria	February 17, 2012	Sony Music Entertainment	CD single
Canada	March 9, 2012	Sony Music Entertainment	CD single
Japan	March 9, 2012	Sony Music Japan	CD single
United Kingdom	March 9, 2012	RCA Records	CD single

== See also ==
- List of best-selling singles in the United States
- List of Billboard Hot 100 number ones of 2012
- List of Adult Top 40 number-one singles of 2012
- List of Billboard Mainstream Top 40 number-one songs of 2012
- List of Billboard Dance Club Songs number ones of 2012
- List of Billboard Adult Contemporary number ones of 2012
- List of UK top-ten singles in 2012
- List of number-one singles of 2012 (Poland)
