= Stronger (Kelly Clarkson album) =

Studio album by Kelly Clarkson
- Released: October 21, 2011
- Recorded: 2010–2011
- Studios: Chalice Recording (Los Angeles, California); Smoakstack (Nashville, Tennessee); Starstruck (Nashville, Tennessee)
- Genre: Pop rock
- Length: 47:25 (Standard); 61:45 (Deluxe)
- Labels: RCA; 19
- Producers: Josh Abraham; Howard Benson; Darkchild; Ester Dean; Chris DeStefano; Toby Gad; Jason Halbert; Dante Jones; Steve Jordan; Brian Kennedy; Michael Knox; Greg Kurstin; Andre Lindal; Oligee

Kelly Clarkson chronology
All I Ever Wanted (2009)	Stronger (2011)	iTunes Session (2011)

Singles from Stronger
- 1. "Mr. Know It All" Released: September 5, 2011; 2. "Stronger (What Doesn't Kill You)" Released: January 17, 2012; 3. "Dark Side" Released: June 5, 2012

Stronger is the fifth studio album by American singer Kelly Clarkson, released on October 21, 2011, by RCA Records. The 13-song track-list features Clarkson collaborating with various new producers as well as with Howard Benson, whom she collaborated with on her previous album, All I Ever Wanted (2009). Wanting to stray away sonically from her previous albums, Clarkson's main objective was to record her vocal performances as it is heard in her live sets, and used as little auto-tune processing as possible.

Clarkson began writing new material for the album in November 2009 while touring and finished recording in February 2011. Despite its original intent to be released in late 2010, the release date of the album was pushed back several times. The record is predominantly a pop rock album, with several music critics noting the predominant R&B and country influences Clarkson explored in Thankful (2003) and All I Ever Wanted, as well as dance-pop themes which she had recently developed. The album's lyrical content mainly explores themes about heartbreak, vengeance, forgiveness and empowerment through metaphors about Clarkson's relationships around people.

Upon its release, Stronger received generally favorable reviews from critics, who praised Clarkson's vocal performance, but noted its lack of progression, unlike her previous albums. In the United States, Stronger debuted at number two on the Billboard 200 and became her first record to be certified platinum in five years by the Recording Industry Association of America (RIAA) since My December. Internationally, it debuted within the top-10 in Australia, Canada, Ireland, New Zealand, and the United Kingdom. Stronger received four nominations at the 55th Grammy Awards: It won Best Pop Vocal Album and was nominated for Record of the Year, Song of the Year, and Best Pop Solo Performance for "Stronger (What Doesn't Kill You)".

The album produced three singles. "Mr. Know It All" topped the charts in Australia and South Korea and attained top-10 positions in four countries, including the Billboard Hot 100 in the United States. "Stronger (What Doesn't Kill You)" became the album's most successful release and Clarkson's most successful single overall. It topped the charts in the United States, Poland, Denmark, and Slovakia and attained top-10 positions in over twenty countries around the world. The final single, "Dark Side", was released to moderate success, attaining top-10 positions in three countries. Clarkson promoted Stronger in two concert tours, the Stronger Tour and the 2012 Summer Tour with American alternative rock band, The Fray.

== Background ==
During an interview with MTV News in November 2009, Clarkson stated that while performing on the All I Ever Wanted Tour, she would also be in the process of writing new material for her fifth studio album, which she hoped for a late 2010 release. Later, during an interview with Chart Show TV, Clarkson revealed that she wanted to do something different for the album. Her label felt the same way. On March 4, 2010, Clarkson was announced to perform on the revived Lilith Fair music festival. However, low ticket sales and scheduling conflicts led Clarkson and Norah Jones to cancel their upcoming performances. Clarkson remarked she would focus on recording for her upcoming album instead. Clarkson took a six-month break from her music career in 2010. Clarkson, who had a hectic schedule following the release of her second album Breakaway, admitted that her music career had a bad effect on her health, saying "Because my career went from zero to 100, there was no 'growing'. I learnt well under pressure, but, like, four years passed by and I hit rock bottom, Breakaway just exploded everywhere. Everyone was making a lot of money, so everyone was pushing the train. That's when it finally all caught up with me. I came down with 'walking pneumonia' for the second time in a year. My body was physically giving up. I took six months off and went home. I love working, but at the end of the day you've got to take care of yourself."

== Development ==
"This album was influenced by Prince, Tina Turner, Sheryl Crow, Radiohead and there's a little bit of a Country vibe/influence on a couple of songs."

— Clarkson about the sound of the album.

In an interview with MTV in December 2009, Clarkson said "There's still some like singer/songwriter stuff [on the album], but there's ... I don't know. It's almost like Garbage-meets-pop-meets-Muse. It's a little different. I don't know how it's going to end up. Who knows?" she said. "It always ends up being something completely different." On October 6, 2010, Clarkson hosted an impromptu session on the social networking site Twitter to update fans regarding the status of the album. Clarkson tweeted "We've almost completed the album. We're gonna have way too many songs to pick from," later adding that she hoped to release it in early 2011. Claude Kelly, who had previously worked with Clarkson on All I Ever Wanted, remarked "Well, I wrote "My Life Would Suck Without You" for the last album, so we're trying to take it up a level", adding "She's toured the world with that album. She's experienced stuff, so whatever she's going through right now — fun, good, the bad, the ugly — we want to put on that record." During an interview with Entertainment Weekly, Clarkson remarked that unlike her previous records, such as My December (2007) and her previous single, "Already Gone" (2009), the recorded songs for Stronger did not manage to spark a single conflict with her label RCA Records upon the album's release; she remarked "Usually on most albums, I'll fight and be like 'No, this has to be a single.' There's no real fighting on this. The label and I, we all love them." Clarkson remarked that Stronger was her best album to record. "Everything was really fluid, and everyone agreed on it and that's a first."

== Collaborations and recording ==
Clarkson began collaborating with Howard Benson and Claude Kelly, both of whom also produced songs from her previous album All I Ever Wanted. Jason Halbert, her musical director and her co-writer during the sessions for My December, also added new material for the new album. Clarkson also announced that she worked with several other musicians such as Toby Gad, Greg Kurstin, Josh Abraham, Steve Jordan and Darkchild. Bonnie McKee revealed in an interview that she also contributed with Clarkson for the album, stating "I did a bunch of work with Kelly Clarkson last summer, it’s looking like that will make the album. She really has an incredible voice and I’m excited to see what happens, I have high expectations for that album!"

Recording sessions for Stronger took place at various recording studios around the world while Clarkson was on the international leg of her All I Ever Wanted Tour. Some recording sessions took place at Chalice Recording Studios in Los Angeles, California, and at Smoakstack and Starstruck Studios in Nashville, Tennessee. In August 2010, Clarkson recorded a song with country singer Jason Aldean entitled "Don't You Wanna Stay" for his fourth studio album, My Kinda Party. The song was released as a single in November 2010 and was later included in the deluxe versions of Stronger as a bonus track. In February 2011, Clarkson announced that she would record the final song for the album, "Mr. Know It All", on February 25, 2011. Clarkson also revealed that she recorded two duet songs for the album, saying "There are actually two duets on the new record and I have at some point sang with both of these artists before but not on record." One of the duets, titled "One More Yesterday", which Clarkson confirmed was featuring fellow Idol-alumnus Chris Daughtry, did not manage to make the final track list. The song was written by Daughtry, Richard Marx and Jason Wade, but Clarkson decided not to include it feeling that it might not be suitable for the album's direction. The second duet, "The Sun Will Rise", which appears on the deluxe edition of the album, was revealed to be a duet with American songwriter Kara DioGuardi. The Smoakstack Sessions, Clarkson debuted extended play, was released as a companion EP to the record, and was made available exclusively through her official online music store.

== Title and concept ==
Clarkson revealed that the album's title would be Stronger. She described it as "very much about strength and empowerment, so Stronger felt like the perfect title. Plus that song is just a gold mine — it's a little bit pop, a little bit pop-rock, a little bit urban, a little bit dance, and it ties everything in. And everybody loves that message, 'What doesn't kill you makes you stronger.' It's a perfect representation of my life."

During Clarkson's live web cast on August 30, 2011 she stated what made her title the album Stronger was "mainly because the entire album is very much about empowerment and just strength overall and I love singing songs like that... That was kind of the theme -strength- so we named it Stronger." She also named it Stronger because it comes from a lyric from one of her favorite tracks on the album, initially called "What Doesn't Kill You (Stronger)". "It just kind of encompasses the whole theme for the album", Clarkson commented.

== Composition ==
=== Music and themes ===
Clarkson co-wrote seven tracks from the album, and collaborated with other artists such as Ester Dean and Bonnie McKee for the first time. Clarkson stated that the new music will be different from her previous albums, describing it as "like Garbage-meets-pop-meets-Muse." Claude Kelly remarked that the songs he wrote "were in true Kelly Clarkson form; singer records that showcase her voice, but also show her edge and her attitude and her personality." He also explained that "[It's] always up-tempo for me when it comes to Kelly. I like to hear her in kick-butt mode. She has an edge to her voice that you want to hear her sing high and get in your face". Darkchild then remarked that he and Lauren Christy wrote a song "that's just crazy pop-rock", and "The first person who came into my head to do it was Kelly Clarkson." Clarkson stated that the album ended up going in a different direction than what they were originally going for.

In an interview with Ryan Seacrest, Clarkson stated that she and her producers strove to record her voice in the album as it is heard at live performances, with as little auto-tune processing as possible, saying "What separates this album are the vocals. They sound richer and fuller, and, for the first time, how I sound when I’m performing live. The producers I worked with just let me sing and be me." Clarkson remarked that "It was a lot of soulful stuff. You know what I'm saying? Like, Radiohead is alternative, but they're very soulful. And Sheryl Crow, very soulful singer-songwriter. So it's all very soulful, rhythmic pop rock." Shortly after the final track listing was revealed, MTV observed that the word "you" featured prominently in the songs' titles. Clarkson asserted "They're all different 'you's'. There's no common, like, it wasn't like one, I didn't have a bad breakup or anything, it wasn't like that. No, I just think life is about relationships, so I always write about all these different ones going on in my life and I don't really have a filter. So it's usually very [straightforward]."

=== Song structure and lyrical content ===
The opening track and lead single, "Mr. Know It All," features a steady four-four stomp, synthetic strings and drum-machine loops, with Clarkson's vocals being deemed as "raw". It talks about a deceptive, arrogant man, with Rolling Stone remarking that "Clarkson sasses a controlling man with double-entendres that up her R&B appeal." The second track, "What Doesn't Kill You (Stronger)", was described as a "chilly" electropop and "glitter-disco" song, about encouraging personal reinvention. Clarkson herself compared it to her 2004 hit single "Since U Been Gone". The third, "Dark Side", is a mid-tempo track about a longing to be loved and accepted unconditionally, while "Honestly" longs for the truth, even when it's hard. Clarkson wrote "You Love Me" following an incident that she thought would break her, which she described as the most hurt she has ever been in her life, and while writing about it she was able to get it out of her system. It has Clarkson laying her anger at her emotional abuser's feet and features heavy guitar in its chorus.

"Einstein" was defined as a "bratty kiss-off", on which "she does the math for a no-good boyfriend." The line, "I may not be Einstein, but I know dumb plus dumb equals you", was largely criticized by music critics. "Standing in Front of You" was considered a "poetic ballad about imploring a gun-shy guy to take the plunge and commit." The eighth track, the pop punk "I Forgive You", talks about forgiveness and was seen as "a heartfelt postscript to the guy who left her in 'Since U Been Gone'." "Hello" is an uptempo "rugged" track that "finds its groove in the chorus [and] handclaps on the bridge." "The War Is Over" was considered a "post-breakup song" with "pummeling" drums, while "Let Me Down" has Clarkson being "'dumb enough to linger' with a bad boy." "You Can't Win", a punch-guitar song, "reflects on the reality that there are always going to be critics, no matter what you say or do. It strives to encourage 'the one who doesn't quite fit in' not to internalize criticism too deeply." The closing track on the standard edition, "Breaking Your Own Heart," was named an "acoustic country" song.

== Release and promotion ==
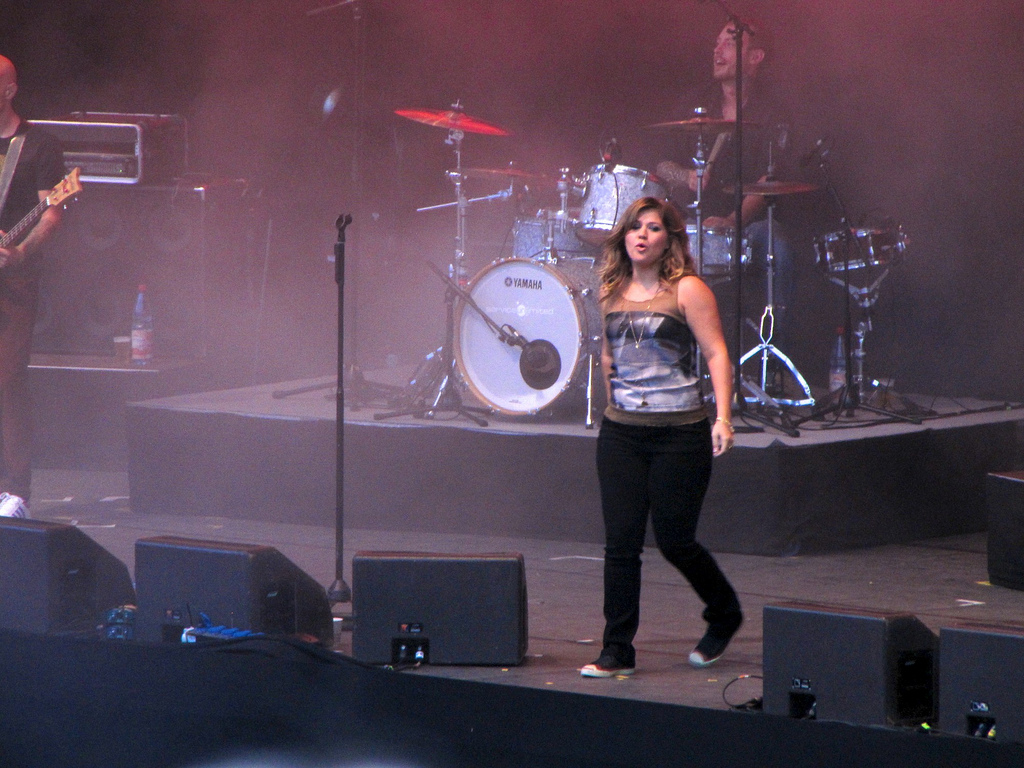
Clarkson performing "Mr. Know It All" in Berlin, Germany, September 2011.

In October 2009, Clarkson announced that the album would be released in Fall 2010. In January 2011, Clarkson stated that the album would be released in March 2011. In March 2011, Clarkson announced that the album had been pushed back to September 2011, explaining "I realize that is a long time, but that’s the best time to release it apparently so I’m sorry for the wait, but I promise you it sounds great!" Producer Darkchild told The Hollywood Reporter that it was a "smart decision", while Claude Kelly remarked that the move could work in her favor, citing "I will say that I'd be willing to bet that the reason it was pushed back was not for anything as horrible or earth-shattering as people think — it's probably (sic) a better setup". It was also reported that the delay was caused by the internal restructuring at Sony Music with the former Universal Music Group chairman Doug Morris entering as its new CEO. On July 11, 2011, several demo songs that Clarkson recorded, ranging from 50 to 70, were leaked onto the internet, some of which were recorded in 2002 while Clarkson was recording Thankful, and others were recorded for Stronger. RCA immediately issued warnings to infringing websites, and leaked tracks were soon removed from such sites. Clarkson, who came home after spending a vacation in Tahiti, released a statement, saying "I get back in the States from a vacation and somehow 50 of my songs are leaked on the Internet?! There's no point in getting angry because there's nothing I can do. I can't wait for everybody to hear my actual finished fifth album." In an exclusive interview with Entertainment Weekly, Clarkson responded to the situation:

"Oh my God, have you ever been robbed? I have. I’ve been physically robbed a couple of times, but this is much worse. Those songs came out and people are like, 'Oh my God, what direction is Kelly going?' I think what made me mad was that. People stole from me, everybody had no idea what my next album was going to sound like. That really caused a lot of confusion. Here’s the best part though, nothing that’s leaked is the final version. Those are all demos."

Clarkson then added, "I don’t even have (the full album), by the way, because I’m so freaked out to put it on my computer," referring to the incident in December 2010 where two hackers from Germany were arrested after stealing songs by international pop artists including Clarkson, Lady Gaga, Kesha and Justin Timberlake by accessing their own computers. On August 17, 2011, Clarkson announced that the album's title would be Stronger, and was set to be released on October 25, 2011. On September 7, 2011, RCA released the album cover and moved up the American release date to October 24, 2011. The deluxe edition of the album was intended to be released simultaneously with the standard edition worldwide. On October 15, the Japanese iTunes Store accidentally released the whole album for purchase which was immediately replaced by snippet previews later that day.

=== Marketing ===
Clarkson previewed the song "Why Don't You Try" during Muhammad Ali's "Celebrity Fight Night" charity event in Phoenix, Arizona on March 19, 2011. On August 16, 2011, RCA announced that they would merge Clarkson's two websites, KellyOfficial.com (Sony Music site) and KellyClarkson.com (Official Fan Club site), in favor of KellyClarkson.com. On August 17, 2011, RCA released press statements for the release "Mr. Know It All", which was released on August 30, 2011, and of Stronger, which was set to be released on October 25, 2011. On September 7, 2011, RCA released the album cover and moved up the release date to October 24, 2011 due to overwhelming demand.

On August 30, 2011, Clarkson hosted a special live webcast on her website to premiere "Mr. Know It All". Clarkson began promoting the song worldwide for the first time at the Stars for Free music festival in Berlin, Germany on September 10, 2011. She then performed it on The Tonight Show with Jay Leno on September 20, 2011, at the iHeartRadio Music Festival in Las Vegas, Nevada on September 23, 2011, on the Australian television series The X Factor, and at the 2011 NRL Grand Final at the ANZ Stadium in Sydney on October 2, 2011 accompanied by three hundred dancers, which marked her first appearance at the event in 8 years since the 2003 NRL Grand Final. On October 5, 2011, Clarkson previewed the final version of "Stronger (What Doesn't Kill You)" and "You Love Me" on her website to positive reviews from music critics. Billboard commented: "The track is a sonic departure from first single 'Mr. Know It All' and may give an indication of the range of material on Stronger." Clarkson then promoted the album at the thirteenth season of Dancing with the Stars on October 18, 2011. Clarkson also performed "Mr Know It All" at the eighth series of British television series The X Factor on October 23, 2011, at the 2011 American Music Awards on November 20, 2011, and at the German television series X Factor on November 1, 2011.

Clarkson then promoted Stronger on The Today Show on October 25 and 27, 2011, The View on October 26, 2011, and Late Night with Jimmy Fallon on October 28, 2011. On October 12, 2011, VH1 announced that Clarkson would film VH1 Unplugged: Kelly Clarkson, featuring songs from Stronger, on October 27, 2011, which would then be broadcast the following month on November 17 and 18, 2011. Clarkson also appeared at the MTV O Music Awards on October 31, 2011. Clarkson then performed "Stronger (What Doesn't Kill You)" on the American television series The X Factor. On December 18, 2011, she participated at the VH1 Divas Celebrates Soul television special. On January 7, 2012, she promoted the album on the 37th season of Saturday Night Live, performing both "Mr. Know It All" and "Stronger (What Doesn't Kill You)".

Clarkson partnered with Toyota to promote Stronger by performing "Stronger (What Doesn't Kill You)" in a Toyota Camry advertisement in 2011 with Chris Berman, Andrew Zimmern and James Lipton. Clarkson also partnered with Sony in promoting Stronger by performing select songs from the album in a free concert sponsored by Sony at The Troubadour in Los Angeles, California on October 19, 2011. Clarkson also performed an acoustic version of "Mr. Know It All" during the Sony presentation at the Consumer Electronics Show in Las Vegas, where she was presented by Howard Stringer, chairman and former CEO of the Sony Corporation. Clarkson also performed "Dark Side" at the 2012 Billboard Music Awards on May 20, 2012.

=== Singles ===
The album's lead single, "Mr. Know It All," premiered on August 30, 2011 during a special live webcast on Clarkson's website, after which the song was immediately sent into radio airplay. The single was released to several countries as a digital download on September 5, 2011. It debuted at number 18 on the Billboard Hot 100, marking Clarkson's second highest debut on the chart since "Never Again" (2007) debuted at number eight. It then peaked at number ten on the chart, thus becoming Clarkson's first top ten single since "My Life Would Suck Without You" (2009) and her ninth top ten single overall. It also peaked at number fifteen on the Billboard Pop Songs chart, at number twelve on the Billboard Adult Contemporary chart, and at number six on the Billboard Adult Pop Songs chart. In the United Kingdom, the song debuted at number six on the UK Singles Chart and peaked at number four, becoming Clarkson's second highest-charting single and her seventh top ten single on the chart. The song also debuted at number twenty-five on the Australian Singles Chart and peaked at number one after Clarkson's performance at the NRL Grand Final, earning Clarkson her first number one and her highest single in Australia.

"Stronger (What Doesn't Kill You)" was released as the second single. It debuted at number 64 on the Billboard Hot 100 with over 40,000 downloads sold. The song eventually reached number one on the Billboard Hot 100 singles chart, becoming her fourth top-three single and third number-one. The song also debuted at number 18 on the International Gaon Chart in South Korea and at number 64 in Canada. "Stronger" proved to be successful internationally, charting in the UK, Poland, New Zealand, Ireland, the Netherlands, Denmark, Belgium, Sweden, Russia, and Australia. The song has received a Gold certification in New Zealand and The United Kingdom and a Platinum certification in Australia.

"Dark Side" was released as the album's third single. Prior to the announcement, the song debuted at number 48 on the International Gaon Chart. It officially impacted Top 40/Mainstream radio in the US on December 26, 2011. Following its release as a single, the song debuted at number 93 on the Billboard Hot 100 and peaked there at number 42.

=== Tours ===
Clarkson also stated in interviews that she was developing touring plans to support Stronger, which would begin in North America in January, during which she stated she might release a live album. On November 15, 2011, RCA announced the North American tour dates, which began on January 13, 2012 at the MGM Grand Theatre in Mashantucket, Connecticut and ended on April 14, 2012 at Beasley Coliseum in Pullman, Washington. Folk rock musician Matt Nathanson and rock band Carolina Liar became the opening acts for the tour. Australian dates began on September 25, 2012 in Brisbane, Australia and ended October 5, 2012 in Perth, Australia. UK and Ireland dates for the tour began on October 10, 2012 in Dublin at The O2 and ended October 20, 2012 at London's Wembley Arena.

On April 16, 2012, Clarkson and The Fray announced that they would be co-headlining a summer concert tour promoting Stronger and The Fray's third studio album, Scars and Stories. The tour began on July 21, 2012 in Ridgefield, Washington and ended on September 15, 2012 in Nashville, Tennessee.

== Critical reception ==
Professional ratings
Aggregate scores
Source	Rating
Metacritic	62/100
Review scores
Source	Rating
AllMusic	4/5 stars
The A.V. Club	C
Entertainment Weekly	B+
The Independent	1/5 stars
Newsday	A−
Now	3/5 stars
Rolling Stone	3/5 stars
Slant Magazine	3.5/5 stars
Spin	7/10
Sputnikmusic	2.0/5

Stronger received generally positive reviews from music critics. At Metacritic, which assigns a weighted mean rating out of 100 to reviews from mainstream critics, the album received an average score of 62, based on 11 reviews. Mikael Wood of Spin wrote that, although "Stronger isn't Clarkson's long-promised Nashville album", she "delivers tunes like 'Einstein' and the disco-glam title track with a country singer's earthy conviction." Melissa Maerz of Entertainment Weekly dubbed it Clarkson's "older-better-tougher-smarter album" and complimented the songs' "finger-wagging, rafter-reaching power". Allison Stewart of The Washington Post wrote that "Clarkson has two moods — scrappy and morose — and Stronger works every possible combination of both", and called it "a good album by a great vocalist who, it’s easy to still hope, is capable of a lot more." AllMusic's senior editor Stephen Thomas Erlewine attributed the album's success "entirely" to Clarkson, "whose personality and professionalism turn it into her best album since her Breakaway breakthrough in 2004". Jon Caramanica of The New York Times asserted that "Ms. Clarkson is turning into the Mary J. Blige of pop: so good at being wounded that no one wants to let her heal." Slant Magazine's Jonathan Keefe felt that, with the exception of "Mr. Know It All"'s "obvious electronic manipulation", Clarkson's performances are "more consistently lived-in and evocative than on any of her previous efforts."

In a mixed review, Rolling Stone editor Jody Rosen wrote that "Clarkson remains a slightly wearying one-note artist—she's a wounded lover, bellowing her pain and scorching the earth. But wow—that voice." The A.V. Club was more critical, writing that "the album suffers from a heavily produced electro-sheen, and ends up feeling more manufactured than magical". Sputnikmusic was ambivalent towards Clarkson's attempt at "something with a deeper purpose" and questioned: "What do you listen to Kelly Clarkson for: the integrity of the songs, or the hooks?" Andy Gill of The Independent found no "development" in Clarkson's singing and panned its music as "an overlong string of standard putdown R&B and bogus emotional turmoil, the songs blitzed with generic power-ballad overkill."

== Commercial performance ==
On its first week of release in the United Kingdom, Stronger sold 29,233 copies, enough for it to debut at number 5 in the UK Albums Chart, the album's release also helped lead single "Mr Know It All" ascend from six to four, with 53,307 in sales, becoming her second highest charting single there ahead of "Since U Been Gone" and behind "My Life Would Suck Without You." In Australia, the album debuted at number three in the ARIA Charts, which was lower than All I Ever Wanted but higher than My December. In the United States, the album debuted at number two on the Billboard 200 chart with 163,000 copies sold, making it the second time Clarkson debuted at the second spot on the chart, the first being My December in 2007. It also became her fifth consecutive album to debut in the top three. Although Stronger had Clarkson's lowest first-week total and marked a drop from All I Ever Wanted, which debuted with 255,000 copies in 2009, its week-to-week commercial performance was better than that of its predecessor. Billboard editor Keith Caulfield predicted that Stronger would surpass All I Ever Wanted and My December in sales. As of September 2012, the album has been certified platinum in the United States, denoting shipments of one million copies and sold over 200,000 copies in the United Kingdom, becoming her second most successful album there after Breakaway, which sold over 1,500,000 copies. As of September 2017, Stronger has sold 1,129,000 copies in the United States.

Upon the release of Stronger, the song "I Forgive You" debuted and peaked at number 48 on South Korea's Gaon Chart, and on the International Gaon Chart it debuted and peaked at number one. Other songs debuted on the same chart as follows: "You Love Me" (#46), "Hello" (#47), "Dark Side" (#48), "Breaking Your Own Heart" (#49), "Standing in Front of You" (#50), "Honestly" (#51), "Einstein" (#53), "Let Me Down" (#61), "You Can't Win" (#63) and "The War Is Over" (#65).

== Track listing ==
Stronger — Standard edition
No.	Title	Writer(s)	Producer(s)	Length
1.	"Mr. Know It All"	Brian Seals; Ester Dean; Brett James; Dante Jones	Brian Kennedy; Dean^{[a]}; Jones^{[b]}	3:52
2.	"What Doesn't Kill You (Stronger)"	Jörgen Elofsson; Ali Tamposi; David Gamson; Greg Kurstin	Kurstin	3:41
3.	"Dark Side"	busbee; Alex G.	Kurstin	3:44
4.	"Honestly"	Tom Shapiro; Robert Marvin; Catt Gravitt	Kurstin	3:36
5.	"You Love Me"	Kelly Clarkson; Josh Abraham; Oliver Goldstein	Abraham; Oligee	4:04
6.	"Einstein"	Clarkson; Toby Gad; Bridget Kelly; James Fauntleroy	Gad	2:59
7.	"Standing in Front of You"	Clarkson; Aben Eubanks	Jason Halbert	3:59
8.	"I Forgive You"	Rodney Jerkins; Andre Lindal; Lauren Christy	Darkchild; Lindal	3:04
9.	"Hello"	Clarkson; Abraham; Goldstein; Bonnie McKee	Abraham & Oligee	2:59
10.	"The War Is Over"	Gad; Olivia Waithe	Gad	3:57
11.	"Let Me Down"	Clarkson; Chris DeStefano	DeStefano	3:24
12.	"You Can't Win"	Clarkson; Abraham; Goldstein; Felix Bloxsom	Abraham; Oligee	4:19
13.	"Breaking Your Own Heart"	Jennifer Hanson; Michael Logen	Howard Benson	3:48
Total length:				47:25

Stronger — iTunes Store edition (bonus track)
No.	Title	Writer(s)	Producer(s)	Length
14.	"Why Don't You Try"	Eric Hutchinson	Steve Jordan	4:47
Total length:				52:12

Stronger — Deluxe edition (bonus tracks)
No.	Title	Writer(s)	Producer(s)	Length
14.	"Don't You Wanna Stay" (with Jason Aldean)	Jason Sellers; Paul Jenkins; Andy Gibson	Michael Knox	4:20
15.	"Alone"	Abraham; Goldstein; McKee; Ryan Williams	Abraham & Oligee	3:01
16.	"Don't Be a Girl About It"	Clarkson; Brent Kutzle	DeStefano	3:27
17.	"The Sun Will Rise" (featuring Kara DioGuardi)	Kyle Jacobs; Danelle Leverett	Benson	3:33
Total length:				61:45

Stronger — Japanese and iTunes Store deluxe edition (bonus track)
No.	Title	Writer(s)	Producer(s)	Length
18.	"Why Don't You Try"	Hutchinson	Jordan	4:47
Total length:				66:32

Notes

- ^{^a} signifies a co-record producer
- ^{^b} signifies an additional record producer
- "What Doesn't Kill You (Stronger)" is listed as "Stronger (What Doesn't Kill You)" in later pressings and digital versions of the album.

== Track details ==
=== Why Don't You Try ===
In 2009, Eric Hutchinson opened for Kelly Clarkson in selected dates in her All I Ever Wanted Tour, where he debuted a new song, "Why Don't You Try", originally intended for his fourth studio album. Clarkson recalled upon hearing the song:

"Eric Hutchinson was touring with me in Australia and I was in my dressing room and all of a sudden I heard this song. I was like, what is he singing?! And I ran out of the dressing room – I looked like a hot mess! I was in the middle of getting my hair and make-up done. He had just surprised the audience with a new song. He came off the stage and I was like, you need to write me a song like that! And instead, he gave me that song so I could have it on my album. It's a very relatable song to me."

In February 2011, Clarkson recorded the song with Steve Jordan in New York. The recording sessions featured prominent session musicians—including Pino Palladino on bass, Hugh McCracken on guitar, Ivan Neville on piano, and Jordan on Drums. All of them had previously collaborated with Jordan, primarily Palladino—who, like Jordan, is also a member of the musical ensemble John Mayer Trio. It is also one of the last recordings in which McCracken appeared before he died in 2013. "Why Don't You Try" is a R&B ballad, it was the first announced track for her fifth studio album, Stronger, which was ultimately released in October 2011.

Brian Masfield of USA Today wrote that "Why Don't You Try" "lets Kelly unleash her inner Aretha." Clarkson performed "Why Don't You Try" during Muhammad Ali's "Celebrity Fight Night" charity event in Phoenix, Arizona on March 19, 2011. A live version of the song also appears on her second extended play, iTunes Session, which was released in December 2011.

== Personnel ==
Vocals

- Jason Aldean – lead vocals
- Lauren Christy – backing vocals
- Kelly Clarkson – all vocals, backing vocals
- Chris DeStefano – backing vocals
- Kara DioGuardi – lead vocals

Musicians

- Howard Benson – additional keyboards, additional programming
- Felix Bloxsom – drums
- Kim Bullard – keyboards, programming
- Paul Bushnell – bass
- Randy Cooke – drums
- Chris DeStefano – instruments, programming, arrangements
- Craig Duncan – hammered dulcimer
- Kevin Dukes – guitars
- Chris Dye – programming
- Aben Eubanks – guitars
- Andre Frappier – guitars
- Josh Freese – drums
- Toby Gad – instruments, programming
- Jason Halbert – keyboards
- Dann Huff – guitar solo
- Steve Jordan – drums, percussion
- Brian Kennedy – keyboards, programming
- Greg Kurstin – keyboards, programming, guitars, bass
- Lee Levin – drums
- The Love Sponge String Quartet – strings
  - David Angell – violin
  - John Catchings – cello
  - David Davidson – violin
  - Kristin Wilkinson – viola
- Tony Lucido – bass
- Deborah Lurie – string arrangements
- Hugh McCracken – guitars
- Jerry McPherson – guitars
- Miles McPherson – drums
- Ivan Neville – acoustic piano, synthesizers
- John Mark Painter – string arrangements
- Pino Palladino – bass
- Brent Paschke – guitars
- Leon Pendarvis – organ, vibraphone
- Chris Rodríguez – guitars
- Thaddaeus Tribbett – bass
- Dan Warner – guitars
- Phil X – guitars
- Frank Zummo – drums

Production

- Josh Abraham – producer
- Jeff Aldrich – A&R
- Joe Baldridge – engineer
- Howard Benson – producer
- Narvel Blackstock – management
- Darkchild – producer
- Lani Crump – production coordinator
- Paul DeCarli – digital editing
- Ester Dean – co-producer
- John Denosky – editing
- Chris DeStefano – producer, recording
- Mike Donaldson – recording
- Jimmy Fahey – assistant engineer
- Meghan Foley – art direction, design
- Toby Gad – producer, recording
- Eric Greedy – recording
- Chris Gehringer – mastering
- Serban Ghenea – mixing
- Oliver Goldstein – producer
- Erwin Gorostiza – creative director
- John Hanes – mix engineer
- Jason Halbert – producer, vocal producer
- Hatsukazu Inagaki – additional engineer
- Dante Jones – additional production
- Steve Jordan – producer
- Michael Knox – producer
- Greg Kurstin – producer, engineer
- Justin McIntosh – photography
- Heather J. Miley – additional production
- Buckley Miller – additional engineer
- Jon Nicholson – drum technician
- Dave O'Donnell – engineer
- John Mark Painter – string recording
- Mike Plotnikoff – recording
- Tim Roberts – additional production
- Phil Seaford – assistant mix engineer
- Harper Smith – photography
- Jesse Shatkin – engineer
- Sean Tallman – recording
- Marc Vangool – guitar technician
- Orlando Vitto – recording
- Dewain Whitmore Jr. – vocal producer
- Ryan Williams – engineer
- Nathan Yarborough – assistant engineer
- Kenta Yonesaka – assistant engineer

Imagery

- Steph Ashmore – wardrobe
- Peter Butler – hair stylist
- Ashley Donovan – make-up

== Charts ==
=== Weekly charts ===
Chart (2011–2013)	Peak position
Australian Albums (ARIA)	3
Austrian Albums (Ö3 Austria)	20
Belgian Albums (Ultratop Flanders)	45
Belgian Albums (Ultratop Wallonia)	57
Canadian Albums (Billboard)	4
Dutch Albums (Album Top 100)	16
French Albums (SNEP)	142
German Albums (Offizielle Top 100)	14
Irish Albums (IRMA)	8
Italian Albums (FIMI)	68
Japanese Albums (Oricon)	59
South Korean Albums (Circle)	13
South Korean International Albums (Circle)	1
Mexican Albums (Top 100 Mexico)	85
New Zealand Albums (RMNZ)	6
Polish Albums (ZPAV)	64
Scottish Albums (Official Charts)	4
Spanish Albums (Promusicae)	40
Swedish Albums (Sverigetopplistan)	39
Swiss Albums (Schweizer Hitparade)	12
UK Albums (Official Charts)	5
US Billboard 200	2
US Top Tastemaker Albums (Billboard)	9

=== Year-end charts ===
Chart (2011)	Position
Australian Albums (ARIA)	37
UK Albums (OCC)	99
US Billboard 200	126
Chart (2012)	Position
Australian Albums (ARIA)	52
UK Albums (OCC)	68
US Billboard 200	24

== Certifications ==
Region	Certification	Certified units/sales
Australia (ARIA)	Platinum	70,000^{^}
Canada (Music Canada)	Platinum	80,000^{^}
New Zealand (RMNZ)	Gold	7,500^{^}
United Kingdom (BPI)	Gold	100,000^{^}
United States (RIAA)	Platinum	1,129,000
^{^} Shipments figures based on certification alone.

== Release history ==
List of release dates, showing region, label, format, edition(s) and catalog number
Region	Date	Label	Format(s)	Edition(s)	Catalog
Australia	October 21, 2011	Sony Music Entertainment	CD, digital download	Standard, Deluxe	88697-96180-2
Belgium	October 21, 2011	Sony Music Entertainment	CD, digital download	Standard, Deluxe	88697-96180-2
Ireland	October 21, 2011	Sony Music Entertainment	CD, digital download	Standard, Deluxe	88697-96180-2
Italy	October 21, 2011	Sony Music Entertainment	CD, digital download	Standard, Deluxe	88697-96180-2
Netherlands	October 21, 2011	Sony Music Entertainment	CD, digital download	Standard, Deluxe	88697-96180-2
Norway	October 21, 2011	Sony Music Entertainment	CD, digital download	Standard, Deluxe	88697-96180-2
Singapore	October 21, 2011	Sony Music Entertainment	CD, digital download	Standard, Deluxe	88697-96180-2
Austria	October 24, 2011	Sony Music Entertainment	CD, digital download	Standard, Deluxe	88697-96180-2
Denmark	October 24, 2011	Sony Music Entertainment	CD, digital download	Standard, Deluxe	88697-96180-2
Finland	October 24, 2011	Sony Music Entertainment	CD, digital download	Standard, Deluxe	88697-96180-2
France	October 24, 2011	Smart Records, Columbia Records	CD, digital download	Standard, Deluxe	88697-96180-2
Greece	October 24, 2011	Sony Music Entertainment	CD, digital download	Standard, Deluxe	88697-96180-2
Hong Kong	October 24, 2011	Sony Music Entertainment	CD, digital download	Standard, Deluxe	88697-96180-2
New Zealand	October 24, 2011	Sony Music Entertainment	CD, digital download	Standard	88697-56801-2
New Zealand	October 24, 2011	Sony Music Entertainment	CD, digital download	Deluxe	88697-96180-2
Portugal	October 24, 2011	Sony Music Entertainment	CD, digital download	Deluxe	88697-96180-2
Poland	October 24, 2011	Sony Music Entertainment	CD, digital download	Eco	10025925
Poland	October 24, 2011	Sony Music Entertainment	CD, digital download	Standard, Deluxe	88697-96180-2
Sweden	October 24, 2011	Sony Music Entertainment	CD, digital download	Standard, Deluxe	88697-96180-2
United Kingdom	October 24, 2011	RCA Records, 19 Recordings	CD, digital download	Standard	88697-56801-2
United Kingdom	October 24, 2011	RCA Records, 19 Recordings	CD, digital download	Deluxe	88697-96180-2
Canada	October 24, 2011	Sony Music Entertainment	CD, digital download	Standard	88697-56801-2
Canada	October 24, 2011	Sony Music Entertainment	CD, digital download	Deluxe	88697-96180-2
South Korea	October 24, 2011	Sony Music Entertainment	CD, digital download	Standard	88697-56801-2
South Korea	October 24, 2011	Sony Music Entertainment	CD, digital download	Deluxe	88697-96180-2
Spain	October 24, 2011	Sony Music Entertainment	CD, digital download	Deluxe	88697-96180-2
Russia	October 25, 2011	Sony Music Entertainment	CD, digital download	Deluxe	88697-98564-2
Taiwan	October 25, 2011	Sony Music Entertainment	CD, digital download	Deluxe	88697-96180-2
United States	October 25, 2011	RCA Records, 19 Recordings	CD, digital download	Standard	88697-56801-2
United States	October 25, 2011	RCA Records, 19 Recordings	CD, digital download	Deluxe	88697-96180-2
Japan	October 26, 2011	Sony Music Japan	CD, digital download	Import	88697-96180-2
Germany	October 28, 2011	Sony Music Entertainment	CD, digital download	Deluxe	88697-96180-2
Brazil	October 31, 2011	Sony Music Entertainment	CD, digital download	Deluxe	88697-96180-2
Japan	November 2, 2011	Sony Music Japan	CD, digital download	Deluxe	SICP-3302
Philippines	November 3, 2011	Ivory Music and Video	CD, digital download	Deluxe	88697-96180-2
