= Hello (Kelly Clarkson song) =

Song by Kelly Clarkson

from the album Stronger
- Recorded: 2011
- Studio: Pulse Recording Studios (Los Angeles, CA)
- Genre: Rock
- Length: 3:00
- Label: RCA
- Songwriters: Kelly Clarkson; Josh Abraham; Oliver Goldstein; Bonnie McKee
- Producers: Abraham; Oligee

"Hello" is a song by American recording artist Kelly Clarkson, from her fifth studio album, Stronger (2011). Written by Clarkson, Josh Abraham, Oliver Goldstein, and Bonnie McKee, with production by Abraham and Oligee, "Hello" is a midtempo rock song about searching for companionship in hopes of not being lonely, in which the singer asks, "Hello? Is anybody listening?"

Upon its release, "Hello" was received with positive reception from music critics, who regarded it as a vocal highlight of Stronger. Boosted by digital sales during the album's release, the song entered the South Korean Singles Chart at number 47. Clarkson has also performed it a limited live performance during her Stronger Tour in 2012.

== Release and composition ==
"Hello" was written by Kelly Clarkson Josh Abraham, Oliver Goldstein, and Bonnie McKee, with Abraham and Goldstein (as Ollgee) handling the song's production. During the summer of 2011, Clarkson and McKee had collaborated on tracks such as "Hello" and "Alone", intending it to be recorded for Clarkson's fifth studio album, Stronger, which was released on October of that same year. An acoustic version of the "Hello" was included as the opening track of her first extended play, The Smoakstack Sessions (2011).

Written in the key of E minor, "Hello" is a midtempo rock song with guitar chords and its hand claps. According to the sheet music published by Kobalt Music Publishing, Clarkson's voice range featured in the song spans from A_{3} to E_{5}. Jarett Wieselman of omg! Insider noted that its chord progression is similar to Katy Perry's single "Last Friday Night (T.G.I.F.)" (2011), a track also written by McKee.

== Critical response ==
"Hello" has received positive reviews from music critics. Jason Lipshutz of Billboard described it as "a slightly more rugged track that finds its groove in the chorus. The handclaps on the bridge are a nice touch" and added that the song "is gonna be a killer in concert." Seattle Post-Intelligencer's Jason Scott described "Hello" as a "Fun" and "cool" track. He compared it to tracks recorded on All I Ever Wanted (2009) and noted that the track relies "solely on the "O" vowel to tell a story. "Ignorance isn't wise, but it beats being alone," Clarkson sings before asking if anybody is listening. We hear you loud and clear!" Brian Mansfield of USA Today considered "Hello" as a vocal highlight of Stronger, he wrote in his review: "this rock tune sounds happier than its lyrics, which depict Kelly as feeling alone even when she's not by herself." Sam Lansky of PopCrush compared it to "Mr. Know It All", and described it as a '90s throwback. He wrote, definitely works, especially with the hooky chorus and heartbroken ferocity of the bridge: "Holding onto the memories of when I, I didn't know / Ignorance isn't wise but it beats being alone." Ryan Pearson of The Huffington Post noted that "there is an undertone of loneliness and sadness coursing throughout, including some downbeat lyrics co-written by Clarkson herself. "Hello, is anybody listening? Won't somebody show me that I'm not alone," she sings on "Hello"."

== Credits and personnel ==
Credits adapted from the Stronger liner notes.

Recording

- Recorded by Ryan Williams at Pulse Recording, Los Angeles, California

Personnel

- Vocals – Kelly Clarkson
- Drums – Felix Bloxsom
- Engineer – Ryan Williams
- Producer – Josh Abraham, Oligee
- Vocal producer – Jason Halbert
- Songwriting – Kelly Clarkson, Josh Abraham, Oliver Goldstein, Bonnie McKee

== Charts ==
Chart (2011)	Peak position
South Korea International Singles (GAON)	47
