= I Forgive You =

Song by Kelly Clarkson

from the album Stronger
- Released: October 21, 2011
- Recorded: February – April 2011
- Studio: 2nd Floor Studios in Hollywood, California
- Genre: Pop rock; power pop
- Length: 3:04
- Label: RCA
- Songwriters: Rodney Jerkins; Andre Lindal; Lauren Christy
- Producers: Darkchild; Andre Lindal

"I Forgive You" is a song by American singer Kelly Clarkson, included on her fifth studio album Stronger (2011). It was produced and co-written by Rodney "Darkchild" Jerkins and Andre Lindal, with extra writing and background vocals from Lauren Christy. Musically, "I Forgive You" is a pop rock and power pop song.

The song has received generally positive reviews from music critics. Due to digital sales after the album's release, the song charted at number 1 in South Korea, becoming Clarkson's second number one song after "Mr. Know It All".

== Background and composition ==
"I Forgive You" is a pop rock and power pop song with a length of 3:04 (3 minutes and 4 seconds), fueled by rumbling guitars and drums, with its lyrical content dealing with themes about forgiveness of relationships. It was written by Darkchild, Andre Lindal, and Lauren Christy, with additional background vocals by Christy. The track also marked the first time Darkchild (who was prominently known for producing R&B and hip hop tracks) produced a pop rock song and he pitched it to Clarkson who agreed the same evening. Brent Paschke, a guitarist for the American pop rock band Spymob, played the guitars along with Dan Warner of the production duo Los Gringo. Lee Levin, also of Los Gringo, performed the drums; and Thaddaeus Tribbett, a bassist for English recording artist Estelle, performed the bass guitar on the song. In July 2011, a demo of the song was leaked online.

== Critical reception ==
"I Forgive You" has received generally positive reviews from music critics. Chris Willman of Reuters remarked that the song "sounds like nothing but power-pop fun, even though its Cars-style rock riffage and synth gurgles lead into a surprisingly cathartic expression of absolution." Jason Lipshutz of Billboard pointed out that the song has the most arresting opening line, but also noted that "If only the rest of the song didn't go through the pop-rock motions." Jason Scott of Seattle Post-Intelligencer remarked, "Chalking up wreckless [sic] behavior to not being old enough to know better, the tune lays "no shame, no blame" on the contagious lyrics and Clarkson's ability to make everything out of nothing." Jon Caramanica of The New York Times pointed out its similarities with Clarkson's previous songs, most notably "Since U Been Gone" (2004), but noted that "this happens on all of Ms. Clarkson's albums, though — the shadow of that song, one of the pop highlights of the last decade, is too long to dodge completely." Matt Busekroos of the Quinnipiac Chronicle remarked that the song "is a fun pop track, but this one sounds like a retread of past songs."

== Chart performance and live performances ==
Boosted by digital sales following the album's release, "I Forgive You" debuted at the Gaon Single Chart with 170,655 copies on the week ending 29 October 2011. It stayed at the top the following week with 122,856 copies, before descending to number 2 with 59,707 copies. Clarkson included the song on the set list of the two concert tours supporting Stronger, the Stronger Tour and the 2012 Summer Tour.

== Credits and personnel ==
Credits adapted from the liner notes of Stronger.

Personnel

- Songwriting — Rodney Jerkins, Andre Lindal, Lauren Christy
- Production — Darkchild, Andre Lindal
- Vocals — Kelly Clarkson
- Background vocals — Kelly Clarkson, Lauren Christy
- Bass — Thaddaeus Tribbett
- Drums — Lee Levin
- Recording engineers — Eric Greedy, Mike Donaldson, Orlando Vitto

== Charts ==
Chart (2011)	Peak position
South Korea International Singles (Gaon Chart)	1

== See also ==
- List of number-one international songs of 2011 (South Korea)
