= Mr. Know It All =

Mr. Know It All may refer to:

- "Mr. Know It All" (Kelly Clarkson song), 2011
- "Mr. Know It All" (Teddy Swims song), 2026
- Mr. Know-It-All (web series), an American animated web series
- "Mr. Know-It-All", a Rocky & Bullwinkle segment

== See also ==
- "He's Misstra Know-It-All", a 1974 Stevie Wonder song
- Know-It-All (disambiguation)
