= List of number-one international songs of 2011 (South Korea) =

The Gaon Digital Chart is a chart that ranks the best-performing international songs in South Korea. The data is collected by the Korea Music Content Association. Below is a list of songs that topped the weekly, monthly, and yearly charts, as according to the Gaon 국외 (Foreign) Digital Chart. The Digital Chart ranked songs according to their performance on the Gaon Streaming, Download, BGM, and Mobile charts.

== Weekly charts ==
Sales until the week ending February 26 were not released.

Date	Song	Artist	Total Downloads
January 1	"We No Speak Americano"	Yolanda Be Cool & DCUP	
January 8	"We No Speak Americano"	Yolanda Be Cool & DCUP	
January 15	"What the Hell"	Avril Lavigne	
January 22	"Hold It Against Me"	Britney Spears	
January 29	"Hold It Against Me"	Britney Spears	
February 5	"We No Speak Americano"	Yolanda Be Cool & DCUP	
February 12	"We No Speak Americano"	Yolanda Be Cool & DCUP	
February 19	"Born This Way"	Lady Gaga	
February 26	"Born This Way"	Lady Gaga	
March 5	"Born This Way"	Lady Gaga	64,330
March 12	"Born This Way"	Lady Gaga	62,612
March 19	"Born This Way"	Lady Gaga	57,361
March 26	"We No Speak Americano"	Yolanda Be Cool & DCUP	38,164
April 2	"I Wanna Go"	Britney Spears	59,477
April 9	"I Wanna Go"	Britney Spears	72,990
April 16	"I Wanna Go"	Britney Spears	65,057
April 23	"Judas"	Lady Gaga	90,324
April 30	"Mr. Taxi"	Girls' Generation	112,231
May 7	"Mr. Taxi"	Girls' Generation	189,620
May 14	"Mr. Taxi"	Girls' Generation	109,213
May 21	"Mr. Taxi"	Girls' Generation	69,617
May 28	"Mr. Taxi"	Girls' Generation	50,004
June 4	"The Edge of Glory"	Lady Gaga	48,397
June 11	"Every Teardrop Is a Waterfall"	Coldplay	101,582
June 18	"Best Thing I Never Had"	Beyoncé	85,742
June 25	"Best Thing I Never Had"	Beyoncé	174,773
July 2	"Moves Like Jagger"	Maroon 5 featuring Christina Aguilera	256,848
July 9	"Moves Like Jagger"	Maroon 5 featuring Christina Aguilera	203,833
July 16	"Moves Like Jagger"	Maroon 5 featuring Christina Aguilera	145,743
July 23	"Moves Like Jagger"	Maroon 5 featuring Christina Aguilera	117,191
July 30	"Moves Like Jagger"	Maroon 5 featuring Christina Aguilera	106,671
August 6	"Moves Like Jagger"	Maroon 5 featuring Christina Aguilera	66,009
August 13	"Moves Like Jagger"	Maroon 5 featuring Christina Aguilera	84,009
August 20	"Moves Like Jagger"	Maroon 5 featuring Christina Aguilera	67,500
August 27	"Moves Like Jagger"	Maroon 5 featuring Christina Aguilera	62,630
September 3	"Moves Like Jagger"	Maroon 5 featuring Christina Aguilera	67,991
September 10	"Mr. Know It All"	Kelly Clarkson	178,727
September 17	"Moves Like Jagger"	Maroon 5 featuring Christina Aguilera	81,093
September 24	"The World as I See It"	Jason Mraz	160,198
October 1	"The World as I See It"	Jason Mraz	217,848
October 8	"The World as I See It"	Jason Mraz	147,914
October 15	"Party Rock Anthem"	LMFAO featuring Lauren Bennett & GoonRock	74,533
October 22	"Party Rock Anthem"	LMFAO featuring Lauren Bennett & GoonRock	77,328
October 29	"I Forgive You"	Kelly Clarkson	170,655
November 5	"Party Rock Anthem"	LMFAO featuring Lauren Bennett & GoonRock	84,017
November 12	"Party Rock Anthem"	LMFAO featuring Lauren Bennett & GoonRock	65,259
November 19	"The Way You Move"	Ne-Yo featuring Trey Songz & T-Pain	119,711
November 26	"Party Rock Anthem"	LMFAO featuring Lauren Bennett & GoonRock	55,700
December 3	"Party Rock Anthem"	LMFAO featuring Lauren Bennett & GoonRock	60,478
December 10	"Ready Go"	4Minute	138,631
December 17	"Turn All the Lights On"	T-Pain featuring Ne-Yo	75,617
December 24	"Party Rock Anthem"	LMFAO featuring Lauren Bennett & GoonRock	58,893
December 31	"Party Rock Anthem"	LMFAO featuring Lauren Bennett & GoonRock	67,339

== Monthly charts ==
Month	Song	Artist	Total Downloads
January	"We No Speak Americano"	Yolanda Be Cool & DCUP	
February	"Born This Way"	Lady Gaga	
March	"We No Speak Americano"	Yolanda Be Cool & DCUP	145,182
April	"I Wanna Go"	Britney Spears	231,348
May	"Mr. Taxi"	Girls' Generation	456,589
June	"Best Thing I Never Had"	Beyoncé	368,706
July	"Moves Like Jagger"	Maroon 5 feat. Christina Aguilera	636,886
August	"Moves Like Jagger"	Maroon 5 feat. Christina Aguilera	303,982
September	"Moves Like Jagger"	Maroon 5 feat. Christina Aguilera	310,275
October	"Party Rock Anthem"	LMFAO feat. Lauren Bennett & GoonRock	393,164
November	"Party Rock Anthem"	LMFAO feat. Lauren Bennett & GoonRock	254,823
December	"Party Rock Anthem"	LMFAO feat. Lauren Bennett & GoonRock	246,420
Note: all data can be retrieved through going to Gaon Digital Chart and selecting 국외 (international), 월간 (monthly) and the month.

== Year-end chart ==
Rank	Song	Artist(s)	Total Downloads
1	"Moves Like Jagger"	Maroon 5 featuring Christina Aguilera	2,149,469
2	"Party Rock Anthem"	LMFAO featuring Lauren Bennett & GoonRock	1,886,081
3	"We Speak No Americano"	Yolanda Be Cool & DCUP	943,091
4	"Born This Way"	Lady Gaga	763,202
5	"I Got My Eye On You"	Nari & Milani & Cristian Marchi feat. Luciana	992,516
6	"What The Hell"	Avril Lavigne	798,673
7	"Mr. Taxi"	Girls' Generation	786,115
8	"Sex Apeal"	Bueno Clinic	592,567
9	"Sorry For Party Rocking"	LMFAO	718,609
10	"Go Ape"	Far East Movement	698,697
