= The War Is Over (Kelly Clarkson song) =

Song by Kelly Clarkson

from the album Stronger
- Recorded: 2011
- Studio: Kite Music Studios (California)
- Length: 3:57
- Label: RCA
- Songwriters: Toby Gad; Olivia Waithe
- Producer: Toby Gad

"The War Is Over" is a song by American singer Kelly Clarkson, from her fifth studio album, Stronger (2011). Written by Toby Gad and Olivia Waithe, and produced by Gad, "The War Is Over" is a ballad that tells of a resolute ending to a relationship between lovers, in which the woman, after seeing that their relationship is turbulent beyond repair, decides to walk away.

Upon its release, "The War Is Over" received mixed to positive reviews from music critics, whose criticism targeted the song's lyrical content, but also complimented her somber vocal performance. Fueled by digital sales during Stronger's release, the song entered South Korean Singles Chart at number 65. Clarkson has also performed it in limited live performances, primarily in select dates of her Stronger Tour.

== Background and release ==
Originally titled "The War Is Over (You Don’t Deserve Me)", "The War Is Over" was written by Toby Gad and Olivia Waithe (better known by her stage name as Livvi Franc) and was produced by Gad. Gad first met Clarkson in 2010, in which he recalled, "She's a very strong survivor, and very organic and very real," he said. "You can connect with her on a very human level." Clarkson revealed that it was the first song to be recorded for her fifth studio album, Stronger, which was released in 2011. She explained:

"It's actually one, I didn't write, but it's actually the first song we recorded for this record because everybody loved it. It tells a beautiful story that everybody relates to. Fans will come up to me and they'll be like, oh, I relate that my family or I relate that to an ex or I relate that to my sister in our relationship. Like, that song for me personally has a lot to do with the industry. I'm just going drown myself with people who have the same vision and the same goals as myself. I'm not going to recognize the bashing. I'm not going to recognize the negativity."

In October 20, 2011, Clarkson premiered "The War Is Over" in her YouTube channel to prevent it from leaking. An acoustic version of the track also appears on her debut extended play, The Smoakstack Sessions (2011).

== Composition ==
Written in the key of G Major, "The War Is Over" is a midtempo ballad with throbbing drums and various layered vocals. Its lyrics tell of a resolute ending to a relationship between lovers, in which the woman, after seeing that their relationship is strained and incorrigible, decides to leave it. Gad pointed out that song presents a coda to a romantic relationship or to an actual war. He remarked, "That's the underlying theme for her, to vent emotions that we all feel in our relationships." Clarkson also revealed about its musical's content: "I think there’s always going to be that level with me. That’s the type of music I love. I grew up loving feisty women singers. I find a lot of joy in getting all that crap out of your system. I haven’t been in a bad relationship in years. It’s just that I’ve been in a bad relationship, and I think when you’re singing any song like that, you pull from the one thing in your life that you know you’ve experienced."

== Critical response ==
"The War Is Over" has received mixed to positive reviews from music critics. Sam Lansky of PopCrush compared the song to Clarkson's 2009 single, "Already Gone", he added, "When Clarkson sings, “All I can say is / You don’t deserve me / You don’t deserve me,” it’s hard not to get a little misty." Jason Scott of the Seattle Post-Intelligencer wrote in his review: "Sure, Clarkson demonstrates her haunted soul, but she makes it clear that she's the one doing the walking away. "You don't deserve me," she concludes over the bridge. The thing that makes this track interesting is that Clarkson has taken her pain (and previous breakup songs) and churned out a lyrical improvement and more mature take. It goes without saying that her vocals are on point, and she makes sure to choose specific moments to drive forward and pull back." Stephen Thomas Erlewine of AllMusic wrote in his review, "she even dips her toe into brooding My December territory on “The War Is Over”."

Brian Mansfield of USA Today offered a mixed review, he wrote, "You know the bad thing about relationships on Kelly Clarkson albums? Even when they break up, they never end. Either Kelly lets the memory of the guy live rent-free inside her head, or, as is the case here, the guy keeps after her and she keeps swearing she's walking away, but she never actually leaves. It's like the couples are stuck in some eternal limbo where they're never together but they're never quite free of each other." Eric Danton of the Hartford Courant also offered a mixed review: "A stab at weary resignation on "The War is Over" belabors the battlefield conceit, though the song also makes a point it didn't intend to make: Clarkson doesn't need a bunch of lyrical frippery to be great. She's a star, sure, but the one-time cocktail waitress from Fort Worth doesn't seem like the sort to express herself through eye-rolling combat analogies." Jason Lipshutz of Billboard was puzzled about his lyrics, he wrote: "Another defiant track marked by its pummeling drums. The lyrics are frustratingly vague — who are you fighting, Kelly, and why?"

== Credits and personnel ==
Credits adapted from the Stronger liner notes.

Personnel

- Kelly Clarkson – vocals
- Toby Gad – production, instruments, programming, recording
- Toby Gad – songwriting
- Livvi Franc – songwriting

== Charts ==
| Chart (2011) | Peak position |
|---|---|
| South Korea International Singles (GAON) | 65 |
