= Wanna Make You Love Me =

Single by Andy Gibson
- Released: September 12, 2011
- Genre: Country
- Length: 2:50
- Label: R&J, Curb
- Songwriters: Jim Collins; Bobby Pinson
- Producer: James Stroud

Andy Gibson singles chronology
"Wanna Make You Love Me" (2011)	"Summer Back" (2012)

"Wanna Make You Love Me" is a song recorded by American country music artist Andy Gibson. It was released in September 2011 as Gibson's first single. The song was written by Jim Collins and Bobby Pinson.

== Critical reception ==
Billy Dukes of Taste of Country gave the song four stars out of five, writing that "the tall, dark-haired singer shows off a big voice on a song that is just far enough past vanilla to get noticed by radio and listeners."

== Music video ==
The music video was directed by David McClister and premiered in September 2011.

== Chart performance ==
"Wanna Make You Love Me" debuted at number 57 on the U.S. Billboard Hot Country Songs chart for the week of October 1, 2011.

Chart (2011–2012)	Peak position
US Hot Country Songs (Billboard)	27

=== Year-end charts ===
Chart (2012)	Position
US Country Songs (Billboard)	83
