= Don't You Wanna Stay =

Single by Jason Aldean with Kelly Clarkson

from the album My Kinda Party
- Released: November 29, 2010
- Recorded: 2010
- Studio: Treasure Isle Recording Studios (Nashville, TN); Westwood Studios (Nashville, TN)
- Genre: Country pop
- Length: 4:16 (album version); 3:41 (radio edit)
- Label: Broken Bow; RCA; RED Distribution
- Songwriters: Andy Gibson; Paul Jenkins; Jason Sellers
- Producer: Michael Knox

Jason Aldean singles chronology
"My Kinda Party" (2010)	"Don't You Wanna Stay" (2010)	"Dirt Road Anthem" (2011)

Kelly Clarkson singles chronology
"Cry" (2010)	"Don't You Wanna Stay" (2010)	"Mr. Know It All" (2011)

Music video
- "Don't You Wanna Stay" (Live) on YouTube

"Don't You Wanna Stay" is a song by American singers Jason Aldean and Kelly Clarkson. It was written by Andy Gibson, Paul Jenkins, and Jason Sellers. It was released On November 29 2010 as the second single from Aldean's fourth studio album My Kinda Party, following Aldean's and Clarkson's performance on the 44th annual Country Music Association Awards on November 10, 2010, due to strong demands of radio stations, and was also included on the deluxe edition of Clarkson's fifth studio album Stronger (2011). The song contains elements of country and pop, and its lyrics speak of the difficulties of finding and maintaining love.

"Don't You Wanna Stay" was met with generally favorable reviews by critics who considered the song as "a classic power ballad". Critics also lauded the interesting combination between Aldean's and Clarkson's voices. The song was a crossover hit, peaking at number one on the Billboard Hot Country Songs and at number 31 on the Billboard Hot 100. It also reached the top 40 in Canada. It became Aldean's fifth number one single and Clarkson's first number one single on the Billboard Hot Country Songs and was certified double platinum by the Recording Industry Association of America (RIAA).

Both Aldean and Clarkson performed the song on several occasions, notably on the tenth season of American Idol and at the 54th Annual Grammy Awards. Footage from the Country Music Association award performance was used to comprise a music video for "Don't You Wanna Stay", directed by Paul Miller. The song was nominated for "Best Country Duo/Group Performance" at the 54th Annual Grammy Awards, but lost to "Barton Hollow" by The Civil Wars. "Don't You Wanna Stay" was covered by Colton Dixon and Skylar Laine in the eleventh season of American Idol and was performed by Justin Chain and Shelbie Z in the fifth season of The Voice.

== Background and release ==
"Don't You Wanna Stay" was written by Andy Gibson, Paul Jenkins and Jason Sellers. According to Sellers, they were at Jenkins' house when they started composing the song. He explained, "We just wanted to write a love song. We had an idea of what we were targeting. We didn’t write it as a duet. We wrote it, and Andy thought about recording it. After we got the song written, we played it for Jason. Jason Aldean's idea for it was to make it a duet." The song is the first duet that Aldean has recorded. In an interview with Nashville.com, Aldean revealed that the song was not originally presented to him as a duet. Nevertheless, he and producer Michael Knox thought the lyrics would work for two people if he could find a female artist as a duet partner. Aldean considered a number of female vocalists to record the song with, especially Kelly Clarkson and Carrie Underwood. However, Clarkson remained as his first choice. He explained,

"We had the song pitched to us and originally it wasn’t a duet. The more I was listening to the thing and learning the song, I realized it set itself up to be a duet if we wanted to go that route. When I called my producer about it he asked who I wanted to sing it with me and I said Kelly Clarkson, but I didn’t think we’d be able to get her. I’ve always been a big fan of hers. I love her voice and I love her style. Long story short, we got her a copy of the song and she loved it. As soon as she started singing, it became obvious it was going to be great."

On November 10, 2010, "Don't You Wanna Stay" was performed live for the first time by Aldean with Clarkson on the 44th Country Music Association Awards. The performance triggered an overwhelming demand from radio stations across the country. As a result, Aldean’s label, Broken Bow Records, made the song available on PLAY MPE. Carson James, the label's Senior Vice President for Promotion responded, "If there’s one thing I’ve learned in my years in the record business, it is always give radio what they want [...] Our entire promotion staff has spent all night fielding calls and returning texts about getting this song, so we decided it best to release it on Play MPE first thing this morning." Myra Dehais of RED Company claimed that the song's rise at adult-radio stations was a result of the company's distribution, saying "This is a proud moment for RED distribution, [...] In crossing a country song over to the adult and pop formats, we can face resistance, since (some) stations have only a slot or two for country music, in order to maintain sonic balance. "Don't You Wanna Stay" was later included on the deluxe edition of Clarkson's fifth studio album, Stronger (2011).

== Composition ==
"Don't You Wanna Stay" (2010)
A 25 second sample of "Don't You Wanna Stay" by Jason Aldean and Kelly Clarkson. The song incorporates guitar riff and violin.

"Don't You Wanna Stay" is a country pop song with a length of four minutes and sixteen seconds. It incorporates melancholic guitar riff which is accompanied by classical elements such as violin. Mikael Wood of Billboard described the song as "a dramatic, slow building power ballad in the style of Bonnie Tyler's "Total Eclipse of the Heart"", a view held similar by John Hill of About.com who considered the song as a "classic power ballad", writing "whether you want to call the song country, pop, or something in between doesn't matter because the chorus is so catchy that it doesn't matter if you use an electric guitar or a steel guitar." It is set in common time and has a steady tempo of 72 beats per minute. It is written in the key of G-sharp minor and both Aldean and Clarkson's vocals span two octaves, from A♯_{3} to G♯_{5}. It follows the chord progression G♯m–E–B. Bob Peacock of Roughstock thought that the structure of the song was interesting with its brief four-line verses and "don't you wanna stay's throughout the chorus. As the chorus of the song starts in, the sound of electric and slide guitars are prominent as Aldean and Clarkson sing, "Don't you wanna hold each other tight / Don't you wanna fall asleep with me tonight?"

Lyrically, the song narrates the difficulties of finding and maintaining love. Cristin Maher of Taste of Country contended that the song exemplifies the desire some people have when they want to make the move from a physical relationship to an emotional relationship, which is represented by the song lyrics "Let’s take it slow, I don’t want to move too fast / I don’t wanna just make love, I wanna make love last." Gibson, one of the writers of the song, stated that the song does not contain a lot of flowery lyrics or sentiment. He added, "It’s just straight up what somebody would say to somebody they’d want to be with."

== Critical reception ==
The song has received generally positive reviews from music critics. Allison Stewart of The Washington Post called the song "great and gooey", saying that it sounded like "Bryan Adams teaming with Heart in 1984 for a contribution to some alternate universe Footloose soundtrack." Blake Boldt of Engine 145 gave the song a “thumbs-up”, calling it "a dramatic affair that demonstrates how pop and country can intersect with each other and offer decent results." He concluded his review with, "'Don't You Wanna Stay' would be a suitable fit for a Foreigner or Whitesnake album, and, though nowhere near a classic, it’s an instant entrant into the 'guilty pleasure' category." Reviewing the album for Billboard, Gary Graff described the song as being part of an "array of such bittersweet, emotionally ambivalent goodbye songs". Bobby Peacock of Roughstock gave the song three-and-a-half stars out of five and praised both Aldean and Clarkson's fine voices, "making for an interesting combination: Jason's rough, slightly nasal voice against Kelly's cleaner, forceful tone." In a different perspective, Kevin John Coyne of Country Universe gave the song a "C" grade, lambasting the song for its musical element, writing "the sheer volume of noise that invades the track with the first chorus takes us straight into Monster Ballads territory." He concluded his review by emphasizing that "this isn’t country music. It just isn’t."

Gary Trust of Billboard noted that the success of "Don't You Wanna Stay" as a crossover adult-radio hit was due to several reasons; Bob Neumann of WSJT, an adult contemporary radio station, posited that "country and adult stations share listeners [...] so audience may have already been familiar with the song based on its original life at country radio." Mike Mullaney of WBMX radio station opined that the song's own merits had propelled its crossover, saying

"Sure, it's a great country song. But, at its core, it's just a great song. It has a lot of the same qualities of Lady Antebellum's 'Need You Now': great lyrics and melody, while each of these singers has amazing emotional resonance in their voices [...] Aldean has a country delivery, but our audience likes country hits. Having Kelly on the track was a big help in initially getting our attention but, ultimately, the song is just a hit."

On March 5, 2013, Billboard ranked the song at number 40 in its list of Top 100 American Idol Hits of All Time. Additionally, it appeared at number 14 of Clarkson's Top 15 Biggest Billboard Hot 100 hits through the week ending April 29, 2017. On the other hand, Sterling Whitaker of The Boot put "Don't You Wanna Stay" at number six on his list of Top 10 Jason Aldean Songs. Laura McClellan of Taste of Country ranked the song at number three of Aldean's Top 10 songs, citing it as "the biggest reason the industry is beginning to recognize Aldean with award nominations." Chuck Dauphin of Billboard ranked the song atop his list of Jason Aldean's 10 Best Songs and described it as "a ballad that one doesn’t get tired of hearing – and that’s not something you see everyday." He also put the song at number 25 in his list of Top 50 Country Love Songs of All Time.

=== Awards and nomination ===
At the 2011 CMT Music Awards, "Don't You Wanna Stay" was nominated for "Collaborative Video of the Year," but lost to Justin Bieber's "That Should Be Me" featuring Rascal Flatts (2010). "Don't You Wanna Stay" received nominations for two awards at the 45th Country Music Association Awards. The song received a nomination for the "Musical Event of the Year" and won the award; it was also nominated for the "Single of the Year" but lost to The Band Perry's "If I Die Young" (2010). At the 54th Grammy Awards, the song received a nomination for "Best Country Duo/Group Performance" but lost to The Civil Wars' "Barton Hollow" (2011). "Don't You Wanna Stay" won two awards of "Single by a Vocal Collaboration" and "Music Video by a Duo/Group/Collaboration" at the 2011 American Country Awards. The song won the awards of "Single of the Year" and "Vocal Event of the Year" at the 47th Academy of Country Music.

== Commercial performance ==
Following the album release of My Kinda Party, "Don't You Wanna Stay" debuted at number 59 on the Billboard Hot Country Songs as well as at number 93 on the Billboard Hot 100 on the week ending November 20, 2010. On its second week on Billboard Hot 100, the song jumped to number 56 after the singers' performance at the Country Music Association awards. The song reached a new peak of number 31 in its 24th week on the chart after Aldean and Clarkson performed the song on American Idol, selling 59,000 paid downloads that week according to Nielsen SoundScan. "Don't You Wanna Stay" also debuted at number 17 and number 39 on Adult Contemporary and Adult Pop Songs charts respectively. In July 2011, the song leapt into the top ten positions of Adult Contemporary (11-8) and Adult Pop Songs (11-9). The ascent prompted the song to re-enter the Billboard Hot 100 at number 48 in its 27th week on the chart.

On the week ending February 27, 2011, "Don't You Wanna Stay" moved to number one on Billboard Hot Country Songs and stayed in the top position for three consecutive weeks. It became Aldean's fifth number one hit and Clarkson's first number one hit on the chart. The accomplishment also made Clarkson as the third American Idol contestant to score a number one hit on the Billboard Hot Country Songs. The feat was first accomplished by Josh Gracin and followed by Carrie Underwood.

The song held the record as the best-selling country collaboration single in digital history until it was overtaken by Blake Shelton and Pistol Annies' "Boys 'Round Here" in 2014. It is Aldean's second song to cross the 2 million mark, following "Dirt Road Anthem" in 2011; and Clarkson's fourth song to cross the 2 million mark following "Since U Been Gone" in 2008, "My Life Would Suck Without You" in 2009, and "Stronger (What Doesn't Kill You)" in 2012. As of September 2017, the song has sold 2,712,000 copies in the US.

== Live performances and usage in media ==
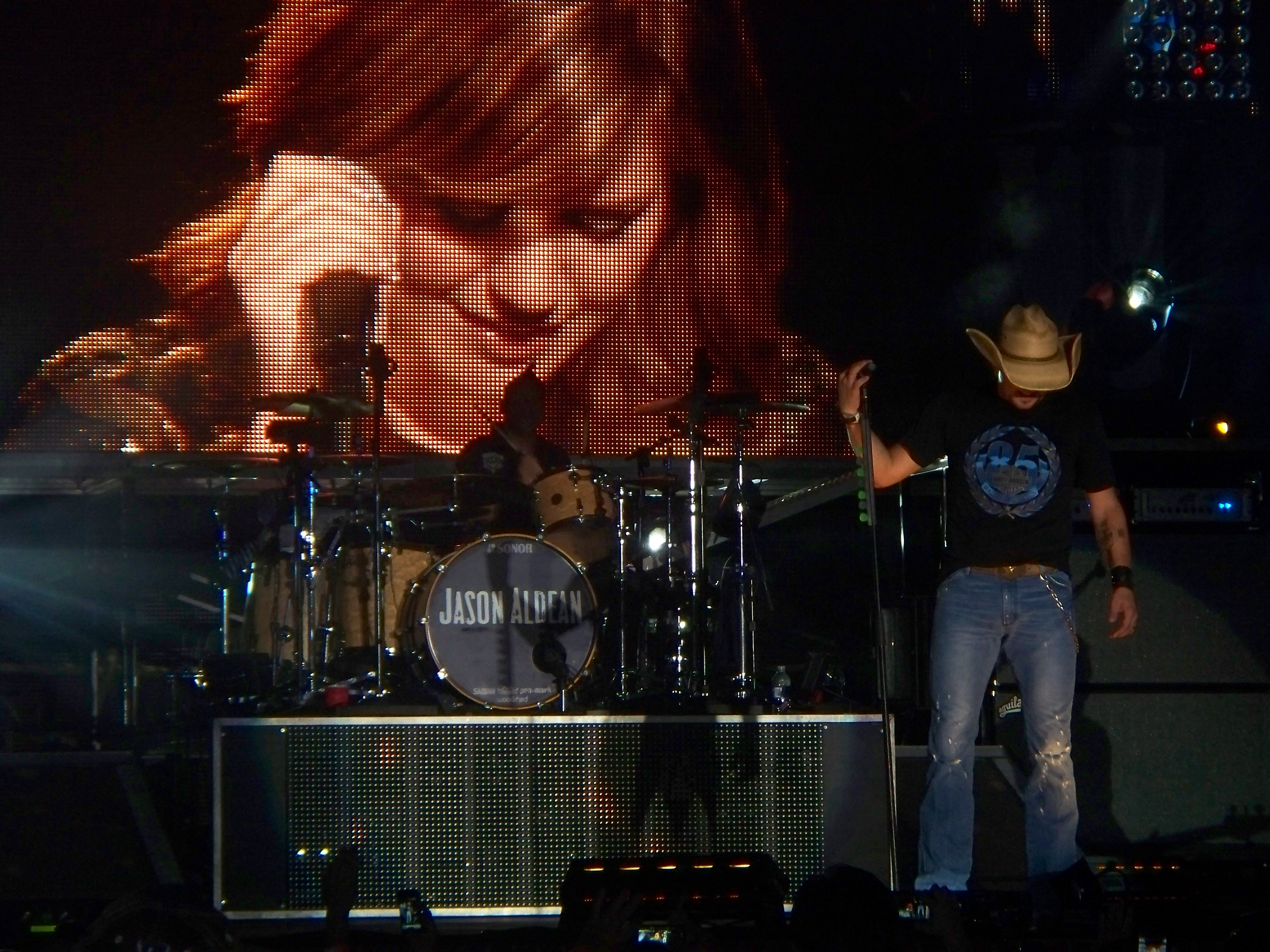
Kelly Clarkson is seen on a big screen behind Jason Aldean

On November 10, 2010, Aldean performed the song with Clarkson for the first time at the 44th annual Country Music Association Awards at Bridgestone Arena in Nashville, Tennessee. Despite receiving a standing ovation, their performance of the song in that event was graded as a "D" in the Los Angeles Times, noting that the song is "a ballad that turned into some oddly orchestrated '80s hair metal tune. It’s an easy slam, but this is "American Idol" bombast." Aldean and Clarkson also performed the song on several other occasions. They sang the song on The Ellen DeGeneres Show on February 22, 2011. On April 14, 2011, they performed the song live on the tenth season of American Idol during the Top 8 results show. They later performed the song live during Country Music Association festival in Nashville, Tennessee on June 9, 2011. Aldean also performed the song on all venues of his concert tour, the My Kinda Party Tour, which started on January 21, 2011. During each performance, Clarkson is seen on a big screen behind Aldean, singing her part of the duet. He explained,

"We decided to go in and film her doing her thing [...] so even though she wasn't at the show, she could still be a part of the show. As big as that song is getting for us right now, it was definitely a song that we thought we had to have in the show. She cut a thing for us to use, and I cut a thing for her to use in her show if she wants to do that. It's a cool way to have her be a part of the show even though she's not going to be there every night."

On February 12, 2012, both Aldean and Clarkson performed the song in front of a stage outfitted with giant clock innards at the 54th Grammy Awards. Todd Martens of Los Angeles Times thought that "the duo looked like they were on the set of "Hugo"." As their performance neared its end, Aldean's microphone suddenly went out. Sarah Wyland of Great American Country felt that Aldean was professional in handling the technical problem by continuing to sing the song with Clarkson. However, Natalie Maines, the lead vocalist of the Dixie Chicks, lambasted Aldean's performance in her Twitter account, writing "Well the good thing about his mic going out is suddenly the song got a lot more in tune." "Don't You Wanna Stay" is also performed by Clarkson in her fourth headlining tour, the Stronger Tour (2012). While Clarkson is performing the song, Aldean is seen on a big screen, singing his part of the duet. She also performed the song as a duet with Blake Shelton while touring at Nokia Theatre L.A. Live, Los Angeles. The song's accompanying music video is composed of the live footage from the Country Music Association awards which was directed by Paul Miller.

"Don't You Wanna Stay" was covered by Colton Dixon and Skylar Laine in the eleventh season of American Idol. Natalie Finn of E! gave a mixed review of the pair's performance, writing "Skylar handled Kelly Clarkson better than Colton played Jason Aldean on "Don't You Wanna Stay," but she's the country girl, so it made sense." Brian Mansfield of USA Today felt that the song was out of Dixon's comfort zone and a little out of Laine's range. Gil Kaufman of MTV remarked that the chemistry between the pair was more like cold fusion. Jennifer Still of Digital Spy said the performance "isn't anything incredible". "Don't You Wanna Stay" was performed by Justin Chain and Shelbie Z in the fifth season of The Voice during the Battle Rounds which was first aired on October 14, 2013. Natasha Chandel of MTV opined that the pair struggled with their pitch and harmonies during rehearsals but successfully stepped up their game during the live performance. A similar view was shared by Ashley Lee of The Hollywood Reporter writing, "Throughout rehearsals, neither the motorcycle accident survivor nor the pageant coach could lock in their harmonies during the choruses [...] They ended up blending well onstage.

== Track listing ==
- Digital download
1. "Don't You Wanna Stay" (with Kelly Clarkson) – 4:16

== Charts and certifications ==
=== Weekly charts ===
Chart (2010–2011)	Peak position
Canada Hot 100 (Billboard)	35
Canada Country (Billboard)	1
South Korea International Singles (Gaon)	107
US Billboard Hot 100	31
US Adult Contemporary (Billboard)	3
US Adult Pop Airplay (Billboard)	9
US Hot Country Songs (Billboard)	1

=== Year-end charts ===
Chart (2011)	Position
US Billboard Hot 100 (Billboard)	68
US Adult Contemporary (Billboard)	12
US Adult Pop Songs (Billboard)	33
US Country Songs (Billboard)	19
Chart (2012)	Position
US Adult Contemporary (Billboard)	44

=== Decade-end charts ===
Chart (2010–2019)	Position
US Hot Country Songs (Billboard)	36

=== Certifications ===
Region	Certification	Certified units/sales
United States (RIAA)	3× Platinum	2,712,000
