= Stronger Tour =

2012 concert tour by Kelly Clarkson

- Tour by Kelly Clarkson
- Promotional image for tour
- Associated album: Stronger
- Start date: January 13, 2012
- End date: October 20, 2012
- Legs: 4
- No. of shows: 43 in North America; 7 in Europe; 1 in South America; 6 in Australia; 57 total

Kelly Clarkson concert chronology
- All I Ever Wanted Tour (2009–10); Stronger Tour (2012); Summer Tour 2012 (2012)
Summer Tour 2012 (2012)	Stronger Tour (2012)	12th Annual Honda Civic Tour (2013)

The Stronger Tour was the sixth headlining tour by American pop recording artist Kelly Clarkson in support of her fifth studio album, Stronger (2011). It began on January 13, 2012, and finished on October 20, 2012, in London, England. With over fifty dates, the tour traveled to the Americas, Australia and Europe. This was the time Clarkson played in Brazil. The tour grossed $7.4M in the US with 43 dates.

== Background ==
During an interview with MTV News, Clarkson stated a tour was being planned for "sometime in 2012". The tour was officially announced on November 14, 2011 with over 30 shows in the United States and Canada. Joining the singer on tour is Matt Nathanson as the opening act on select shows. Clarkson mentioned she was looking forward to performing "Stronger (What Doesn't Kill You)". She explained, "I can't wait to perform What Doesn't Kill You. We've already rehearsed it, and it's so much fun. It's like this big dance anthem". For the show, Clarkson asked her fans to votes to requests on Twitter.

== Opening acts ==
- Matt Nathanson (North America) (select dates)
- Carolina Liar (North America) (select dates)
- The Fray (Australia)
- Sarah De Bono (Australia)
- Cover Drive (Europe)

== Setlist ==
North America

January 13 – April 14, 2012

1. "Dark Side"
2. "Behind These Hazel Eyes"
3. "Since U Been Gone"
4. "Gone"
5. "You Love Me"
6. "Heavy in Your Arms" (Florence + the Machine cover)
7. Fan Request
8. Medley: "The Trouble With Love Is" / "Walk Away" / "How I Feel" / "I Want You"
9. "I Know You Won't" (Carrie Underwood cover)
10. "Einstein"
11. "Don't You Wanna Stay"
12. "Let Me Down"
13. "I Forgive You"
14. "Already Gone"
15. "Breakaway"
16. "You Still Won't Know What It's Like"
17. "Stronger (What Doesn't Kill You)"
18. "Never Again"
19. "Because of You"

Encore

19. "My Life Would Suck Without You"
20. "Mr. Know It All"
21. "Miss Independent"

Notes

- During the concert at the Radio City Music Hall, Clarkson performed "I'd Rather Go Blind".
- During her concert in Grand Prairie, Clarkson sang Bonnie Raitt's "Something To Talk About" with her friend April Beck.
- During the concert in Los Angeles Clarkson performed "When You Believe" with Tamyra Gray, "Leave the Pieces" with Michelle Branch, "Don't You Wanna Stay" with Blake Shelton and "Because of You" with Reba McEntire.
Australia/Europe

September 25 – October 20, 2012

1. "My Life Would Suck Without You"
2. Behind These Hazel Eyes"
3. "I Forgive You"
4. "Dark Side"
5. "Walk Away"
6. "You Love Me"
7. "We Are Young" (fun. cover)
8. Already Gone"
9. Don't You Wanna Stay"
10. Fan request
11. "Because of You"
12. "Catch My Breath"
13. "Let Me Down"
14. "Breakaway"
15. "Since U Been Gone"

Encore

16. "Never Again"
17. "Mr. Know It All"
18. "Miss Independent"
19. "What Doesn't Kill You (Stronger)"

Notes

- In Perth, Clarkson, The Fray & Sarah De Bono all sang fun.'s "Some Nights".
- "Catch My Breath" was only performed in Europe.

=== Fan requests ===
North American leg

January 13 – April 14, 2012

- Ledyard: "Forget You" – (Cee-Lo Green cover)
- Atlantic City: "The War Is Over"
- Albany: "Fix You" – (Coldplay cover)
- Verona: "Breaking Your Own Heart"
- New York: "My Man" – (Barbra Streisand cover)
- Manchester: "The Sun Will Rise"
- Boston: "What About Love"? – (Heart cover)
- Johnstown: "Sober"
- Durham: "Gravity" – (Sara Bareilles cover)
- Jacksonville: "Save You"
- Bossier City: "Crazy For You" – (Madonna cover)
- San Antonio: "Einstein"
- Austin: "Hell on Heels" – (Pistol Annies cover)
- Grand Prairie: "Anytime"
- Biloxi: "Open Arms" w/special guest Clay Aiken
- Hollywood: "Beautiful Disaster"
- Orlando: "Skyscraper" – (Demi Lovato cover)
- Tampa: "Hit Me With Your Best Shot" – (Pat Benatar cover)
- Atlanta: "Exhale (Shoop Shoop)" – (Whitney Houston cover) w/special guest Tamyra Gray
- Champaign: "Maybe"
- Greenville: "Wild Horses" – (The Rolling Stones cover)
- Niagara Falls; March 2: "Hello"
- Niagara Falls; March 3: "You Don't Know Me" – (Eddy Arnold cover)
- London: "F**kin' Perfect" – (P!nk cover)
- Windsor: "You're Still the One" – (Shania Twain cover)
- Hammond: "The Only Exception" – (Paramore cover)
- Sioux Falls: "No Bad News" – (Patty Griffin cover)
- Springfield: "Turpentine" – (Brandi Carlile cover)
- St. Louis: "Give Me One Reason" – (Tracy Chapman cover)
- Broomfield: "Top of the World – (Patty Griffin cover)
- West Valley City: "Iris" – (Goo Goo Dolls cover)
- Kent: "Oh! Darling" – (The Beatles cover)
- Boise: "Beautiful" – (Christina Aguilera cover)
- San Jose: "It Will Rain" – (Bruno Mars cover)
- Bakersfield: "Creep" – (Radiohead cover)
- Reno: "Ready For Love" – (India.Arie cover)
- Los Angeles: "Till the World Ends" – (Britney Spears cover)
- Paradise: "Hopelessly Devoted To You" – (Olivia Newton-John cover from "Grease")
- Indio: "Secret Garden" – (Bruce Springsteen cover)
- San Diego: "Poison & Wine" and "Georgia on my Mind" (with her two duet partners for Duets)
- Wenatchee: "Can't Let Go" – (Mariah Carey cover)
- Pullman: "To Make You Feel My Love" – (Bob Dylan cover)
Australian leg

September 25 – October 5, 2012

- Brisbane: "Someone Like You" – (Adele cover)
- Sydney: "Breathe Me" – (Sia cover)
- Melbourne: "Honestly"
- Adelaide: "Total Eclipse of the Heart" – (Bonnie Tyler cover)
- Perth: "Blown Away" – (Carrie Underwood cover)
European leg

October 10–20, 2012

- Dublin: "Nothing Compares 2 U" – (Sinéad O'Connor cover)
- Manchester: "Wonderwall" – (Oasis cover)
- Birmingham: "Changes" – (Black Sabbath cover)
- Glasgow: "Walking On Broken Glass" – (Annie Lennox cover)
- Sheffield: "The Writer" – (Ellie Goulding cover)
- London: "When It Don't Come Easy" – (Patty Griffin cover)

== Tour dates ==
Date	City	Country	Venue
North America
January 13, 2012	Mashantucket	United States	MGM Grand Theater
January 15, 2012	Atlantic City	United States	Etess Arena
January 17, 2012	Albany	United States	Times Union Center
January 19, 2012	Verona	United States	Turning Stone Event Center
January 21, 2012	New York City	United States	Radio City Music Hall
January 24, 2012	Manchester	United States	Verizon Wireless Arena
January 26, 2012	Boston	United States	Wang Theatre
January 28, 2012	Johnstown	United States	Cambria County War Memorial Arena
January 31, 2012	Durham	United States	Durham Performing Arts Center
February 2, 2012	Jacksonville	United States	Moran Theater
February 4, 2012	Bossier City	United States	Riverdome
February 6, 2012	San Antonio	United States	Majestic Theatre
February 8, 2012	Austin	United States	Long Center for the Performing Arts
February 10, 2012	Grand Prairie	United States	Verizon Theatre
February 14, 2012	Biloxi	United States	Hard Rock Live
February 16, 2012	Hollywood	United States	Hard Rock Live
February 18, 2012 (Note: The show on February 18, 2012, was a part of Mardi Gras at Universal Studios.)	Orlando	United States	Universal Music Plaza Stage
February 21, 2012	Clearwater	United States	Ruth Eckerd Hall
February 23, 2012	Atlanta	United States	Fox Theatre
February 25, 2012	Champaign	United States	Assembly Hall
February 28, 2012	Greenville	United States	Timmons Arena
March 2, 2012	Niagara Falls	Canada	Avalon Ballroom Theatre
March 3, 2012	Niagara Falls	Canada	Avalon Ballroom Theatre
March 6, 2012	London	Canada	John Labatt Centre
March 8, 2012	Windsor	Canada	The Colosseum at Caesars Windsor
March 10, 2012	Hammond	United States	The Venue at Horseshoe Casino
March 12, 2012	Sioux Falls	United States	Sioux Falls Arena
March 14, 2012	Springfield	United States	O'Reilly Family Event Center
March 16, 2012	St. Louis	United States	Fox Theatre
March 18, 2012	Broomfield	United States	1stBank Center
March 20, 2012	West Valley City	United States	Maverik Center
March 22, 2012	Kent	United States	ShoWare Center
March 24, 2012	Boise	United States	Taco Bell Arena
March 27, 2012	San Jose	United States	Event Center Arena
March 29, 2012	Bakersfield	United States	Rabobank Arena
March 31, 2012	Reno	United States	Reno Events Center
April 3, 2012	Los Angeles	United States	Nokia Theatre
April 5, 2012	Las Vegas	United States	Pearl Concert Theater
April 7, 2012	Indio	United States	Fantasy Springs Special Events Center
April 10, 2012	San Diego	United States	Valley View Casino Center
April 13, 2012	Wenatchee	United States	Town Toyota Center
April 14, 2012	Pullman	United States	Beasley Coliseum
Europe
June 9, 2012 (Note: The show on June 9, 2012, was a part of Summertime Ball.)	London	England	Wembley Stadium
South America
June 23, 2012 (Note: The show on June 23, 2012, was a part of Pop Music Festival.)	São Paulo	Brazil	Arena Anhembi
North America
June 29, 2012 (Note: The show on June 29, 2012, was a part of Summerfest.)	Milwaukee	United States	Marcus Amphitheater
Australia
September 25, 2012	Brisbane	Australia	Brisbane Entertainment Centre
September 27, 2012	Sydney	Australia	Sydney Entertainment Centre
September 29, 2012 (Note: The show on September 29, 2012, was a part of Deni Ute Muster.)	Deniliquin	Australia	Deni Freighters Sports Arena
October 1, 2012	Melbourne	Australia	Rod Laver Arena
October 3, 2012	Adelaide	Australia	Adelaide Entertainment Centre
October 5, 2012	Perth	Australia	Challenge Stadium
Europe
October 10, 2012	Dublin	Ireland	The O_{2}
October 12, 2012	Manchester	England	Manchester Arena
October 14, 2012	Birmingham	England	LG Arena
October 16, 2012	Glasgow	Scotland	Braehead Arena
October 18, 2012	Sheffield	England	Motorpoint Arena Sheffield
October 20, 2012	London	England	Wembley Arena

Festivals and other miscellaneous performances

== Box office score data ==
Venue	City	Tickets sold / available	Gross revenue
Times Union Center	Albany	2,890 / 6,833 (42%)	$143,510
Radio City Music Hall	New York City	5,889 / 5,889 (100%)	$398,072
Wang Theatre	Boston	3,518 / 3,518 (100%)	$201,096
Cambria County War Memorial Arena	Johnstown	3,299 / 4,243 (78%)	$148,576
Durham Performing Arts Center	Durham	2,128 / 2,405 (88%)	$152,969
Riverdome	Bossier City	1,338 / 1,400 (95%)	$97,180
Verizon Theatre at Grand Prairie	Grand Prairie	5,778 / 5,778 (100%)	$256,322
Ruth Eckerd Hall	Clearwater	2,052 / 2,052 (100%)	$176,515
Fox Theatre	Atlanta	4,167 / 4,167 (100%)	$203,801
Timmons Arena	Greenville	2,786 / 4,871 (57%)	$103,582
John Labatt Centre	London	4,274 / 5,167 (83%)	$196,127
The Colosseum at Caesars Windsor	Windsor	4,533 / 4,934 (92%)	$451,208
The Venue at Horseshoe Casino	Hammond	2,396 / 3,130 (76%)	$175,155
Fabulous Fox Theatre	St. Louis	3,895 / 3,895 (100%)	$190,729
Maverik Center	West Valley City	3,699 / 5,595 (66%)	$179,824
Taco Bell Arena	Boise	2,758 / 2,758 (100%)	$110,228
Event Center Arena	San Jose	3,896 / 4,063 (96%)	$241,672
Rabobank Arena	Bakersfield	3,946 / 4,400 (90%)	$164,789
Reno Events Center	Reno	5,622 / 6,500 (86%)	$282,026
Nokia Theatre L.A. Live	Los Angeles	7,000 / 7,000 (100%)	$358,278
Brisbane Entertainment Centre	Brisbane	3,683 / 3,857 (95%)	$419,154
Sydney Entertainment Centre	Sydney	6,264 / 6,776 (92%)	$604,022
Manchester Arena	Manchester	8,198 / 9,457 (87%)	$426,879
TOTAL		94,009 / 108,688 (86%)	$5,581,714

== Personnel ==
The Band

- Kelly Clarkson – Lead vocals
- Aben Eubanks – Guitar, backup vocals
- Cory Churko – Guitar, violin, backup vocals (North American leg)
- Chris Rodriguez – Guitar, backup vocals Australian & European leg)
- Einar Pedersen – Bass, backup vocals
- Jason Halbert– Keyboards, musical director
- Miles McPherson – Drums
- Jill Pickering – Backup vocalist, guitar
- Kate Rapier – Backup vocalist, assistant
- Nicole Hurst – Backup vocalist

The Glam Team

- Ashley Donovan – Makeup & hair
- Steph Ashmore – Stylist
- Layne Lewis – Wardrobe

The Crew

- Dennis Sharp – Tour manager
- Alan Hornall – Production manager
- Christopher Dye-Technical director
- Jim Collins – Tour accountant
- Harold Behrens – Stage manager
- Tricia Farrow – Production assistant
- Brian Butner – Security
- Chris Michaelessi – FOH engineer
- Robert Miller – Monitor engineer
- Bryan Jones – Guitar tech
- James Fridley – Guitar tech
- Peter Moffett – Drum tech
- Douglas McKinley – Audio system tech
- Jeffrey Wuerth – Audio system tech
- Kevin Gorge – Audio crew
- Chris Berry – Audio crew
- Fraser MacKeen – Lighting director
- Leroy Bennett – Production lighting manager
- Ron Schilling – Lighting crew chief
- Ben Meserole – Lighting tech
- Jessica Quinn – Lighting tech
- Wade Cotton – Lighting tech
- Cory FitzGerald – Lighting programmer
- William Parisien – Video director
- Nathaniel Fountain – Projectionist
- Nick Strand – Projectionist
- Stephen Haskins – Video tech
- Randall Ice – Video tech
- Martin Capiraso – Head carpenter
- Michael Kinnard – Carpenter
- Bob Powers – Rigger

Other

- Narvel Blackstock & Starstruck Management – Management
- Flood, Bumstead, McCreedy & McCarthy Inc. & Kristen Braaksma – Business management
- CAA & Darryl Eaton – Booking agency
- Preferred Travel – Travel agency
- NPB Companies, Inc. – Security
- Upstaging Inc. – Lighting
- Clair Brothers, 8th Day Sound – Sound
- Tait Towers – Staging/Set
- Chaos Visual Productions – Video company
- Janco Ltd. – Trucking
- Rockit Cargo – Freight
- Rich Koffer & Bravado – Merchandise

== Critical reception ==
The show has received universal critical acclaim, praising Clarkson's vocals, as well as the production of the show and the set list. Michele Amabile from The Hollywood Reporter says that "Clarkson's personable nature and powerhouse vocals prove that she is growing stronger with each album and tour." Kevin McSheffrey from Boston Music Spotlight said "The Wang was sold out and Clarkson's adoring fans stood throughout the performance, dancing along to lively tunes like Since U Been Gone and new single What Doesn’t Kill You (Stronger), while still standing for ballads such as You Still Won’t Know What It's Like and Don’t You Wanna Stay, complete with Jason Aldean appearing virtually through a curtain screen." Glenn Gamboa from the Long Island Newsday stated "That Clarkson can transform that pain into something so beautiful and a concert so enjoyable shows that she is so much more than a great singer. She's a great artist". Greg Haymes from Timesunion.com said "While the simple but versatile stage set (featuring her backing musicians on two multi-level platforms) and the lighting both dazzled, they never over-powered Clarkson and her strong, supple voice". After performing close to her hometown in Dallas, Texas, Rich Lopez from Dallasvoice.com stated "She really is the girl next door with her aw shucks sassy and fun demeanor. Every little comment she made about being home resulted in deafening roars and she punctuated her homegrown flavor with a thick "kuntry" accent. Clarkson was without any doubt, the homecoming queen for the night". Preston Jones from dfw.com called I Know You Won't and Don't You Wanna Stay the songs that stood out the most in her show in Dallas, and also added: The combination of her personable nature with songs expressing deep vulnerability gave a jolt of feeling to a show that often felt like a giddy karaoke party in a superstar's living room.
