= Einstein (song) =

Song by Kelly Clarkson

from the album Stronger
- Recorded: 2011
- Studio: Kite Music Studios (California)
- Genre: Funk rock
- Length: 2:59
- Label: RCA
- Songwriters: Kelly Clarkson; Toby Gad; Bridget Kelly; James Fauntleroy II
- Producer: Toby Gad

"Einstein" is a song by American pop recording artist Kelly Clarkson, from her fifth studio album, Stronger (2011). Originally titled as "Dumb + Dumb = You", "Einstein" was written by Clarkson, Toby Gad, Bridget Kelly, and James Fauntleroy II, with Gad handling the production. Lyrically, the song is written in a woman's first-person narrative about her acquiescence and infuriation towards her ex-lover, whom she described in the song as "dumb". Written in wordplay, it uses various mathematical-related equations and topics as rhetorical devices to describe their relationship, notably referencing the German-born physicist Albert Einstein in a metaphorical lyric, which led to the song being named after him.

Upon its release, "Einstein" received mixed reviews from music critics, whose criticism targeted the song's lyrical content, primarily the lyric "Dumb plus dumb equals you", but also complimented Clarkson's vocal performance. Propelled by digital sales during the album's release week, "Einstein" charted at number 56 in the South Korean Singles Chart. She has performed the song in select dates of her Stronger Tour.

== Background and release ==
"Einstein" was written by Kelly Clarkson, Toby Gad, Bridget Kelly, and James Fauntleroy II; and produced by Gad. Kelly initially wrote the song for her debut studio album, but ultimately gave it to Clarkson. Kelly recalled:

"I wrote the record initially thinking that it would be a part of my project. I don’t really know what I thought. I think, as a writer, you just come up with ideas in songs and you never know what’s going to happen to them—you just do them off inspiration. I didn’t know what kind of life it would take, but I’m really happy it ended up with Kelly."

In May 2011, a demo of the song was leaked into the internet, but was quickly taken down. The final version of the track was selected for inclusion for her fifth studio album, Stronger, which was released in October 2011.

== Composition ==
"Einstein"
A 28-second sample of the chorus and second verse of "Einstein", highlighting the musical composition.

"Einstein" is a midtempo funk rock song. Its lyrical content mains focuses on a woman's realization and anger towards her ex-lover's, with its chorus centering on the realization that it won't take an intelligence like Albert Einstein's to figure out his feeble-mindedness, using a faux-formula phrase "Dumb + dumb = you." Clarkson revealed about its musical's content: "I think there’s always going to be that level with me. That’s the type of music I love. I grew up loving feisty women singers. I find a lot of joy in getting all that crap out of your system. I haven’t been in a bad relationship in years. It’s just that I've been in a bad relationship, and I think when you’re singing any song like that, you pull from the one thing in your life that you know you've experienced." Gil Kaufman of MTV noted its same pop rock vibe to "Since U Been Gone" (2004).

== Critical response ==
"Einstein" received mixed reviews from music critics. Chris Willman of Reuters gave a positive review, he wrote: "The rocker "Einstein" sounds like it might've been written for Pink, though it probably wasn't, since Clarkson gets a co-writing credit. Against guitar squalls and live drums, she does the romantic math ("Our love divided by the square root of pride...It was heavy when I finally figured it out") and concludes that "dumb plus dumb equals you," a formula that will surely help kids get interested in arithmetic this fall."

Jason Lipshutz of Billboard, however, wrote, "Yes, "Einstein" is fun. Yes, Clarkson sounds spectacular. But the refrain reads, "Dumb plus dumb equals you." Moving on!" Ken Tucker of NPR wrote in his review, "She sometimes seems to be singing songs that Justin Timberlake rejected. How else to explain the choice of a song such as "Einstein," with its tortured, mathematically illiterate organizing metaphor? Some of the song's verses are fun just because they're so ostentatiously foolish." But also added, ""Dumb plus dumb equals you," Clarkson bellows. On second thought, I kind of love that performance, in its goofy way. Far better is the kind of crisp vocal work Clarkson brings to a vocal hook worthy of her dramatized agony". Brian Mansfield of USA Today was equivocal on the song's lyrical content. He wrote, "the reliability of the narrator is in question, as she sings, "You say I'm crazy, and that we're happy/Is that supposed to comfort me?" Is the guy a lech who flirts with other women in front of her, or is she just loopy nuts? Your guess is as good as mine." Jim Farber of the New York Daily News referred the chorus of the song as some of the worst lines in pop history. ("I may not be Einstein/but I know that dumb plus dumb equals you").

== Credits and personnel ==
Credits adapted from the Stronger liner notes.

Recording

- Recorded at Kite Music Studios, California.

Personnel

- Vocals – Kelly Clarkson
- Production, Instruments, Programming, Recording – Toby Gad
- Additional production – Heather J. Miley, Tim Roberts
- Songwriting – Kelly Clarkson, Toby Gad, Bridget Kelly, James Fauntleroy II

== Charts ==
Chart (2011)	Peak position
South Korea International Singles (GAON)	53

== See also ==
- Albert Einstein in popular culture
