= Andy Gibson (singer) =

American country music singer (born 1981)

- Born: September 15, 1981 (age 44); Spokane, Washington
- Origin: Nashville, Tennessee
- Genres: Country
- Occupation: Singer-songwriter
- Instrument: Vocals
- Years active: 2011–present
- Labels: R&J, Curb
- Website: andygibson.com

Andy Gibson (born September 15, 1981) is an American country music singer. He co-wrote "Don't You Wanna Stay", a duet between Jason Aldean and Kelly Clarkson which reached No. 1 on the country music charts in 2011. Later in the year, he signed to R&J Records and released his debut single, "Wanna Make You Love Me". Billy Dukes of Taste of Country gave the song four stars out of five, saying that it "begin[s] gathering attention after frequent listens." The song has been made into a music video directed by David McClister, which has aired on CMT. Gibson moved to Curb Records in April 2012 following the closure of R&J, although some R&J staff continued promotion of "Wanna Make You Love Me". Gibson's first Curb single, "Summer Back", entered the charts in late 2012.

== Discography ==
=== Compilation albums ===
Title	Album details
Best of Andy Gibson	Release date: June 29, 2015; Label: Curb Records; Formats: CD

=== Singles ===
Year	Single	Peak positions
Year	Single	US Country
2011	"Wanna Make You Love Me"	27
2012	"Summer Back"	58
2013	"Best Thing"	—
"—" denotes releases that did not chart

=== Music videos ===
Year	Video	Director
2011	"Wanna Make You Love Me"	David McClister
2011	"The Christmas Song"	Nathan Juarez
