= Know-It-All =

Know-it-all or know-all may refer to:

== Books ==
- The Know-It-All, a 2004 book by A.J. Jacobs
- "Doctor Know-all", a German fairy tale

== Film and TV ==
- Knowitalls, a 2009 British quiz show
- "Know All", an episode of Round the Twist, an Australian children's TV series

== Music ==
- Know-It-All (album), a 2015 album by Alessia Cara

== See also ==
- Mr. Know It All (disambiguation)
- Canada's Greatest Know-It-All, a 2012 Canadian reality television series
- Like You Know It All, a 2009 South Korean comedy-drama
- Please Kill Mr. Know It All, a 2013 Canadian romantic comedy film
