= Toby Gad =

German songwriter and producer (born 1968)

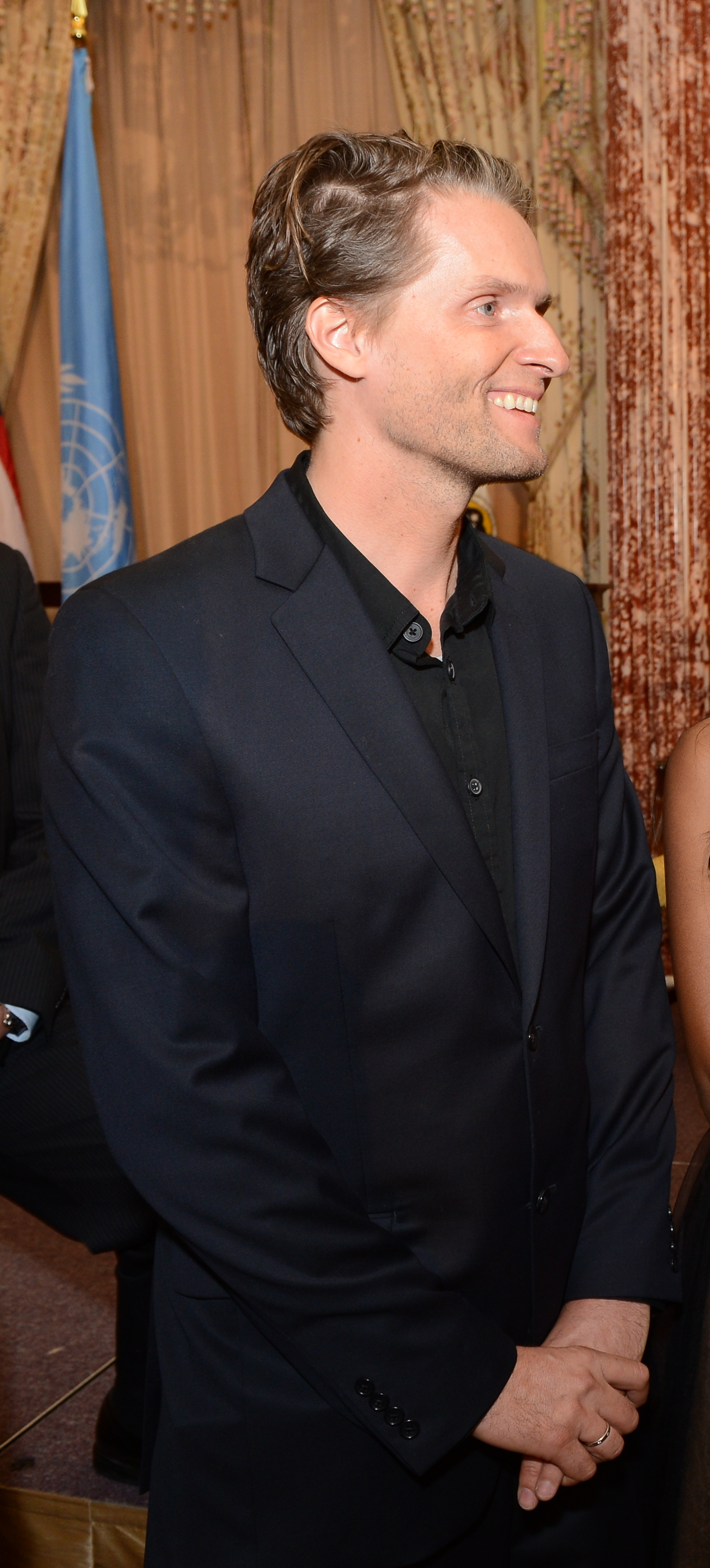
- Toby Gad in 2013

Background information
- Born: Tobias Gad; 28 March 1968 (age 58); Munich, West Germany (now Germany)
- Genres: Pop, rock, R&B, dance
- Occupations: Producer, songwriter, musician
- Instruments: Piano, guitar, bass, programming
- Years active: 1986 – present
- Label: Gad Songs/Kite Music

Tobias Gad (born 28 March 1968) is a German music producer and songwriter based in Los Angeles. He is known for co-writing songs including John Legend's biggest hit, "All of Me", the fifth-highest certified single in RIAA history, and for co-writing and producing "Big Girls Don't Cry" by Fergie and "If I Were a Boy" by Beyoncé. Other notable works include "Skyscraper" for Demi Lovato, "Who You Are" for Jessie J, "Untouched" for The Veronicas, "A Year Without Rain" for Selena Gomez & the Scene, "Don't Hold Your Breath" for Nicole Scherzinger, "Love You More" for JLS, and "I Do" for Colbie Caillat.

In the third quarter of 2014, Gad was ranked the #3 songwriter in America by Billboard, behind Ryan Tedder and Pharrell Williams.

== Biography ==
=== Childhood and early musical experience ===
Born into a musical family in Munich in 1968, Gad was influenced by both parents who were established figures in the Munich music scene with their group, The Jazz Kids. His Danish father is a clarinet player and a pilot. His German mother is a psychotherapist and composer/pianist who tours the UK and Europe with Brian Carrick's jazz band, the Algiers Stompers.

Gad was expected to study banjo and join the Jazz Kids, but he took to playing the piano instead. At age 7, he and his brother Jens had formed their own band, the Gad Rollers, and played original rock'n'roll compositions during intermissions of their parents' gigs.

=== Early career successes ===
Although too young to enter most clubs at age 13, Toby and Jens were no strangers to the live music scene in Munich. Weekly gigs in bars, concerts in open-air summer festivals and shows in legendary live clubs such as the Domicile spread the word, and Munich hit producer Tony Monn showed interest in the brothers. Monn handed over his state-of-the-art recording studio to Toby and Jens whenever he was out of town. Monn's generosity provided a learning environment for Toby and Jens to delve into songwriting and producing.

In 1986, when Frank Farian, a multi-platinum German producer (No Mercy, Boney M, Milli Vanilli) was looking for new talent, a mutual friend turned him on to the Gad brothers' material. The next day, the boys flew to Frankfurt and thus started a seven-year collaboration with Farian. One week later, they found three of their songs on Milli Vanilli's European debut album, All or Nothing which later went multi-platinum in 1988. These songs would later be replaced with others on their North American debut album Girl You Know It's True in 1989.

Farian produced Toby and Jens' first album Q' as artists', which was followed by a live tour. Funk legend George Clinton would later hear the record and invited Toby and Jens to perform two songs on stage with his P-funk band.

=== Commercial breakthrough ===
In 1990, Toby Gad met Mauritian singer Jacqueline Nemorin. This became the beginning of a 10-year collaboration between the two. Together with Farian, Gad produced Nemorin's first album The Creole Dance on BMG.

In 1994, Gad signed on with manager Klaus Frers (Daydream Music Supervizing) and produced Nemorin's second album for EMI Europe. It was also Frers who moved the duo into music production for dozens of successful TV shows, commercials and movie soundtracks. Gad and Nemorin wrote and produced the title-song for the movie Neverending Story III, the music for two popular daily TV talk-shows that stayed on air for four years, and the single "The Magic of the Fall", which went on to win the BDA Gold Award in L.A. for best TV trailer concept. In 1998, Gad was hired by Spanish producer Rafael Perez to work on Enrique Iglesias' third album. That same year, Gad signed a deal with Joost Van Os, former head of Polygram.

=== Move to New York City ===
Following much success in his home country, Gad relocated to New York City, opening Strawberrybee studio in Midtown Manhattan. The album title song and hit single "Unspoken" of Christian platinum artist Jaci Velasquez, written by Gad, Madeline Stone and O.Hatch, managed to stay half a year in the Christian Billboard top 20 single charts and was re-released on the Billboard #2 album, WOW Greatest Hits 2004.

Meanwhile, Gad had several successes back overseas. "Damn I Think I Love You" stayed at #1 for seven weeks and became the most sold single of 2001 in the Netherlands. The #1 StarMaker album with two of Gad's songs went triple platinum. Sita's debut single "Happy" was at #1 for two weeks and remained in the top five for two months. The song was also released in the US on the Wild Thornberries soundtrack, followed by the #1 album of Sita.

=== Success in America ===
After 3 years in New York without any success, Gad was given the chance to work with MTV host Willa Ford. Their single "A Toast to Men" became a #40 radio single, appearing in the hit movie Barbershop 2.

Gad, with David and William Derella from DAS, worked out a co-publishing deal with Cherrylane Music Publishing and record deals for several of Gad's artists. In August 2005, Interscope Records released Texan teen Kaci Brown's album Instigator, entirely developed, produced and co-written by Gad. R&B group Fatty Koo has an album on Columbia Records on which every song is produced and co-written by Toby. He produced and co-wrote songs on the album of the Australian twins The Veronicas, who scored the biggest US newcomer record deal of the year on Warner Bros. Records/Sire Records and went double platinum in Australia.

Meleni and Gad co-wrote the song "Drop It On Me" on Ricky Martin's 2005 album Life. Another artist that Toby developed for years, Lola, released her single "No Strings" on Warner Bros. Records/Sobe, which spent 4 months on the Billboard Dance charts, peaking at #2.

In 2006, Gad opened a second studio with five interns, expanding his production company Strawberrybee Music and his publishing company, Gad Songs. Gad produced the entire Blue Note Records album of Elizabeth Withers, who starred in the Broadway musical The Color Purple, and contributed a song on Fergie's platinum-selling album The Dutchess. He also collaborated with then 13-year-old Emmy nominated actress/singer Keke Palmer on her 2007 debut album on Atlantic Records and produced a song for the second season of hit Disney sitcom Hannah Montana.

As an innovative producer and songwriter, Gad has been interviewed multiple times about how he writes and how he records and mixes using Logic Pro. He has been featured in Mix Magazine, the Recording Mag, Pro Sound News and more.

In 2008, Gad and Fergie's "Big Girls Don't Cry" was Grammy nominated for Best Female Vocal Performance and won ASCAP 'Song of the Year'. The song twice broke the record for most airplay on US radio and spent a total of 21 weeks in various Billboard US charts at #1, including one week #1 on the Billboard Hot 100. Over 87 worldwide compilation albums feature the song. Gad scored his second worldwide #1 hit with Beyoncé's "If I Were a Boy", which Gad produced and co-wrote. "If I Were A Boy" reached #1 in nine countries and hit top-ten in over 20 countries around the world. Gad's third platinum number one hit was the indie-electro pop anthem "Untouched" by Aussie duo The Veronicas. The song sold platinum in the US and reached #1 in Ireland and Mexico.

=== Move to Los Angeles ===
In summer 2009, Gad relocated his recording studio to Los Angeles. The new studio, located in the Hollywood Hills, features several music production rooms and a video editing room. In Los Angeles, Gad continued collaborating with stars such as American Idol finalists Kris Allen, Allison Iraheta and Jessica Sanchez.

In 2009, Gad also launched his own record label, Kite Records, which is a collaboration between himself, David Sonenberg/DAS Management, and Island Def Jam Music Group as well as Gad Films which features exclusive behind the scenes footage of Gad working in the studio with stars such as Miley Cyrus and The Veronicas. In 2011, Gad co-wrote "All of Me" for John Legend, which, after three years of dormancy made its way to #1 on the Top 100 for three weeks and was certified 14 times platinum, making it the highest certified track in RIAA history (tied with "Despacito").

In 2014, Gad co-wrote eleven songs with Madonna for her album Rebel Heart, producing four of the songs.

In 2015, Gad executive produced and co-wrote much of Leona Lewis' fifth studio album, I Am. He co-wrote and produced Prince Royce's "Lucky One" on Double Vision, co-wrote John Newman's "I'm Not Your Man" from Revolve, and co-wrote and produced "First Heartbreak" for Grammy-nominated artist Tori Kelly's Unbreakable Smile. Gad also produced and co-wrote the international charity single "Love Song to the Earth" which featured a long list of popular artists, including Paul McCartney, Fergie, Jon Bon Jovi, Sheryl Crow, Sean Paul, Nicole Scherzinger, and more. He also produced the 2015 album of Chloe Temtchine, Be Brave, which was described by the New York Post as "a moving collection of pop songs that document her struggle for survival, but also her recovery."

Towards the end of this period of songwriting activity, Gad reduced his workload in the mid-2010s and shifted his focus toward his personal life and other projects.

=== Transition to public-facing work ===
In summer 2021, the recording for the nineteenth season of Deutschland sucht den Superstar (German Idol) started, were Gad served as a judge on alongside Florian Silbereisen and Ilse DeLange. It was his first major television role in Germany and introduced him to a wider German audience.

Gad later stated that that experience of "being celebrated for being a songwriter" caused him to do again more songwriting, "pushing hard again". When he heard in February 2023 that none of the eight songs he had written with Angelina Jordan would be used on her next EP, he decided to become more independent from labels. So he now wanted to establish his name to be able to approach major labels to independently release songs he had written with their artist. To gain their trust in the process, he decided "to start with my ‘greatest hits’, re-recording them with new artists, but also passing the torch to new singers with these older songs I wrote 20 years ago", which led to his Piano Diaries album project.

The first result of this project, the 2024 album Piano Diaries – The Hits, is a compilation album featuring eight of his career-defining global hits re-recorded with minimalist piano and string arrangements. While Gad himself played the piano on these tracks, he invited new artists to contribute the vocals, such as Victoria Justice for "Big Girls Don't Cry", Angelina Jordan for "If I Were A Boy", Celina Sharma for "All of Me", and Camylio for "Skyscraper".

Gad also performed these new arrangements live on stage with various artists. Initially done for promotion, he stated that he considers to continue to perform live in the future, citing David Foster's touring model as an inspiration.

== Single peak positions ==
=== U.S. Billboard Hot 100 Entries ===
The following singles written and/or produced by Toby Gad charted on the Billboard Hot 100:

Song title	Featured artist	Release year	Peak position
Big Girls Don't Cry	Fergie	2007	#1
All of Me	John Legend	2013	#1
If I Were a Boy	Beyoncé	2008	#3
Skyscraper	Demi Lovato	2011	#10
Untouched	The Veronicas	2007	#17
I Do	Colbie Caillat	2011	#23
A Year Without Rain	Selena Gomez & the Scene	2010	#35
Hallelujah	Carrie Underwood & John Legend	2020	#54
Here's to Us (Glee Cast)	Glee Cast	2012	#73
Chasing the Sun	Hilary Duff	2014	#79
Take Me on the Floor	The Veronicas	2008	#81
Rock Star	Hannah Montana	2008	#81
Bitch I'm Madonna ft. Nicki Minaj	Madonna	2015	#84
Don't Hold Your Breath	Nicole Scherzinger	2011	#86
Beautiful	Carly Rae Jepsen & Justin Bieber	2012	#87
Ordinary Girl	Hannah Montana	2010	#91
Bang Bang Bang	Selena Gomez & the Scene	2011	#94

=== All Time Hits ===
The following singles appear on the US Billboard Year-End or All-Time Hits charts:

Song title	Featured artist	Release year	Chart Name	Peak position
Big Girls Don't Cry	Fergie	2007	All-Time Hot 100 Hits	#115
Big Girls Don't Cry	Fergie	2007	Decade Hot 100	#13
Big Girls Don't Cry	Fergie	2007	Year-End Hot 100 2007	#4
All of Me	John Legend	2013	All Time Hot 100 Hits	#138
All of Me	John Legend	2013	Decade Hot 100	#32
All of Me	John Legend	2013	Year-End Hot 100 2014	#3
If I Were a Boy	Beyoncé	2008	Decade Billboard 200	#178

=== Grammy Wins ===
The following singles written and/or produced by Toby Gad as presented by The Recording Academy:

Song title	Featured artist	Release year	Nominated Category
Einstein	Kelly Clarkson	2013	Best Pop Vocal Album
All of Me (Tiesto Remix)	John Legend	2013	Best Remixed Recording
If I Were a Boy (on B Album)	Beyoncé	2009	Best Contemporary R&B Album

=== Grammy Nominations ===
The following singles written and/or produced by Toby Gad as presented by The Recording Academy:

Song title	Featured artist	Release year	Nominated Category
Einstein	Kelly Clarkson	2013	Best Pop Vocal Album
The War is Over (You Don't Deserve Me)	Kelly Clarkson	2013	Best Pop Vocal Album
All of Me (Tiesto Remix)	John Legend	2013	Best Remixed Recording
If I Were a Boy (on B Album)	Beyoncé	2009	Best Contemporary R&B Album
All of Me (Live)	John Legend	2015	Best Pop Solo Performance
Hey Baby	Sean Paul	2015	Best Reggae Album
Big Girls Don't Cry	Fergie	2008	Best Female Pop Vocal Performance
We Will Meet Once Again	Andrea Bocelli	2020	Best Traditional Pop Vocal Album
Creo En Mí	Natalia Jimenez	2015	(Latin) Album of the Year
Blessed	Kelly Clarkson	2022	Best Traditional Pop Vocal Album

=== UK single peaks ===
The following singles charted inside the top 40 of the UK Download or UK Singles Chart:

- "If I Were a Boy" by Beyonce - #1 (2008)
- "Don't Hold Your Breath" by Nicole Scherzinger - #1 (2011)
- "Big Girls Don't Cry" by Fergie - #2 (2007)
- "All of Me" by John Legend - #2 (2013)
- "Skyscraper" by Sam Bailey - #1 (2013)
- "Love You More" by JLS - #1 (2010)
- "Skyscraper" by Demi Lovato - #7 (2011)
- "Who You Are" by Jessie J - #8 (2011)
- "Untouched" by The Veronicas - #8 (2009)
- "Living for Love" by Madonna - #26 (2015)
- "Up" by James Morrison & Jessie J - #30 (2011)
- "Fire Under My Feet" by Leona Lewis - #26 (2015)

== RIAA certifications ==
Song name	Artist	Release year	Single Certification	Album Certification
All of Me	John Legend	2013	Diamond (13× Platinum)	Gold
Big Girls Don't Cry	Fergie	2007	4× Platinum	5× Platinum
If I Were a Boy	Beyoncé	2008	3× Platinum	2× Platinum
Rock Star	Hannah Montana	2007	-	3× Platinum
Taken	One Direction	2011	-	3× Platinum
Soy El Mismo	Prince Royce	2013	-	3× Platinum
Perdóname	Prince Royce	2013	-	3× Platinum
Truly Madly Deeply	One Direction	2012	-	3× Platinum
A Year Without Rain	Selena Gomez & the Scene	2010	2× Platinum	Gold
Love is My Disease	Alicia Keys	2009	-	2× Platinum
Little Do You Know	Alex & Sierra	2014	2× Platinum	-
A Year Without Rain	Selena Gomez & the Scene	2011	2× Platinum	Gold
Untouched	The Veronicas	2007	1× Platinum	-
Skyscraper	Demi Lovato	2011	3× Platinum	Gold
Einstein	Kelly Clarkson	2011	-	Platinum
The War is Over (You Don't Deserve Me)	Kelly Clarkson	2011	-	Platinum
Who You Are	Jessie J	2011	-	Platinum
L.O.V.E.	Jessie J	2011	-	Platinum
Only Forever	Demi Lovato	2017	-	Platinum
Hasta La Vista	Camp Rock	2008	-	Platinum
Too Cool	Camp Rock	2008	-	Platinum
Muevelo (Ft. Wisin)	Sofia Reyes	2017	1× Platinum	Gold
Feel Good Ft. Daya	Gryffin & Illenium	2017	1× Platinum	-
I Do	Colbie Caillat	2011	Gold	-
Happy	Natasha Bedingfield	2008	-	Gold
Freckles	Natasha Bedingfield	2008	-	Gold
One Woman Man	John Legend	2017	-	Gold
Here's To Us	Halestorm	2012	Gold	Gold
First Heartbreak	Tori Kelly	2015	-	Gold
Cinderella	Daughtry	2013	-	Gold
Bang Bang Bang	Selena Gomez & the Scene	2011	-	Gold
I Don't Miss You at All	Selena Gomez & the Scene	2009	-	Gold
Hallelujah	Carrie Underwood & John Legend	2020	-	Gold
No Matter What	Calum Scott	2018	-	Gold
