= Mr. Know It All (Kelly Clarkson song) =

2011 single by Kelly Clarkson

Single by Kelly Clarkson

from the album Stronger
- B-side: "My Life Would Suck Without You" (Chriss Ortega Radio Mix)
- Released: September 5, 2011
- Recorded: 2011
- Studio: Chalice Recording (Hollywood, Los Angeles); Kennedy Compound (Studio City, Los Angeles); Starstruck (Nashville, Tennessee)
- Length: 3:53
- Label: RCA
- Songwriters: Brian Kennedy Seals; Ester Dean; Brett James; Dante Jones
- Producer: Brian Kennedy

Kelly Clarkson singles chronology
"Don't You Wanna Stay" (2010)	"Mr. Know It All" (2011)	"Stronger (What Doesn't Kill You)" (2012)

Music video
- "Mr. Know It All" on YouTube

"Mr. Know It All" is a song recorded by American pop singer Kelly Clarkson. It was written by Brian Kennedy, Ester Dean, Brett James, and Dante Jones, with the production handled by Kennedy, Dean, and Jones. Clarkson described the song as a "vocally raw record" and stated that she and her producers strove to record her voice as it is heard at live performances, using as little auto-tune processing as possible. It was released by RCA Records as the lead single from her fifth studio album, Stronger on September 5, 2011.

"Mr. Know It All" is a midtempo song with R&B influences, with its lyrical content dealing with the themes of heartbreak, and relationships with wisenheimers. Upon its release, "Mr. Know It All" has received mostly favorable reception from music critics, who noted the song as significantly different from Clarkson's previous releases. However, some critics compared this song to Alicia Keys' single "Doesn't Mean Anything" (2009) and Bruno Mars' single "Just the Way You Are" (2010). The song became a commercial success, it became her ninth top-ten hit on the Billboard Hot 100, and topped the Billboard Adult Pop Songs chart. Internationally, the song topped the charts in Australia and in South Korea, and has attained a top-ten position in New Zealand, Poland, Flanders (Belgium), and the United Kingdom. It also became a crossover hit to the Billboard Hot Country Songs chart, becoming her first solo single to enter the country chart after 9 years since "A Moment Like This" (2002), prompting RCA to release a country version produced by Dann Huff in 2012.

The song's accompanying music video was directed by Justin Francis and features a "wall of doubt" background in which derogatory headlines about Clarkson are posted. Several of the critics noted the video's informal fallacy approach to mainstream media. Clarkson has performed "Mr. Know It All" in various locations around the world, most notably at the 2011 NRL Grand Final, on the Australian, British and German versions of the television series The X Factor, and on the set-list of her Stronger Tour.

== Background and release ==
During an interview with Ryan Seacrest, Clarkson revealed that "Mr. Know It All" was the last song recorded by her in February 2011 in Nashville, Tennessee. At the live single event, Clarkson then stated that the reason she picked the song as the first single because "it was unlike any other song that I really ever came up with." She later added that "Secondly, just because it's very different from a first single for me. Usually we go with an anthem, guitar-driven song. This is very different... It's just super sassy and it sets up the album nicely," such as "Never Again" (2007) and "My Life Would Suck Without You" (2009). On August 17, 2011, Clarkson revealed that the first single will be "Mr. Know It All," which was set to be released late August. On August 26, 2011, the song leaked online. On August 30, 2011, at 5:30 PM ET, the song was played during a live webcast Clarkson hosted on her official website. The song was available as a digital download from September 5, 2011. Fans who pre-ordered Stronger on Clarkson's official store received the single for free upon its September 5 release. Clarkson recorded an acoustic version of the song for her second extended play iTunes Session in December 2011. In April 2012, a country version, containing re-recorded vocals, of the song, produced by Dann Huff was released.

== Composition ==
Clarkson described "Mr. Know It All" as "different from any of her other singles because the message is not just about relationships. Even though Clarkson admits she has a list of people that have brought her down, she states that the song is also about ignorant people who think they know everything about someone." Monica Herrera of the Rolling Stone remarked, "Clarkson narrows her octave range – no American Idol glory notes here – and sasses a controlling man with double-entendres ("Baby, I ain't goin' down") that up her R&B appeal."

== Critical reception ==
Unlike several of Kelly's leaks, which have gone down a more traditional pop-rock road, "Mr. Know It All" has a distinct R&B flavor, showcasing a side to her vocals we haven't seen in a while. As opposed to the "Since U Been Gone" Kelly, the "Mr. Know It All" Kelly sounds softer and more feminine as she sings."

— MTV Buzzworthy noting Clarkson's departure from her signature pop rock sound

The song has received generally favorable reviews. Upon hearing the single, MTV News commented, "The song is an obvious Clarkson joint: feisty and straightforward, with a strong melody and a sing-along chorus." Entertainment Weekly remarked, "We love it too, Kelly. Especially since we're not the men involved." Billboard stated that "Clarkson's lyrical message may be one of sass and strength (as fans have come to expect from her), but musically, "Mr. Know It All" is a bit softer; instead of rock-focused energy, the single goes midtempo with touches of piano and subtle strings." VH1 reluctantly admitted their positive review, stating "We don’t have to lie. The mid-tempo ballad isn’t our favorite of her tracks, and we wish her vocals were mixed higher, but we dig it nonetheless."

Some of the critics noticed the song's striking resemblance to Alicia Keys' "Doesn't Mean Anything" (2009) and Bruno Mars' "Just the Way You Are" (2010). Music website Popdust focused on its resemblance, remarking "The resemblance is as blatant as that of "Already Gone" and "Halo," but at least those two had the same songwriter (Ryan Tedder). "Mr. Know It All" was written by a collection of non-Smeezingtons, none of whom apparently heard or cared about the resemblance." later adding, "To Clarkson’s credit–and at this point, the track really needs credit–she sells the song with all her considerable vocal worth, and she sounds punchier and more engaged on the verses than she did on much of All I Ever Wanted. The fault lies with the songwriters, not the vocalist." Bill Lamb from About.com rated it four-and-a-half stars out of five and went to praise "the understated vocals with perfect nuance", "the production that wisely gets out of the way of the vocals" and "the words of strength". Lamb also wrote that "Mr. Know It All" features one of the most impressive female pop vocals of 2011. The raspy approach here matches the strength informed by pain of the lyrics of the song. It is a style decision that makes the brief moments of gentle clarity in her voice even more affecting." On March 5, 2013, Billboard ranked the song #23 in its list of Top 100 American Idol Hits of All Time.

== Chart performance ==
"Mr. Know It All" debuted in number 30 on Billboard Adult Pop Songs chart just hours after its release and peaked at number 1. The song then debuted on the Billboard Hot 100 chart on September 24, 2011, at number 18, her highest single debut on the chart since "Never Again", which debuted at number 8 in 2007. It also debuted on the Billboard Digital Songs at number 9 with 107,000 downloads sold, and at the Billboard Pop Songs chart at number 29. On the first-week release of Stronger, "Mr. Know It All" rose up on the Hot 100 chart from number 19 to number 10, becoming Clarkson's first top ten hit since "My Life Would Suck Without You" in 2009, and her ninth top ten overall. As of September 2017, "Mr. Know It All" has sold 1,919,000 paid digital downloads in the United States.

"Mr Know It All" also debuted at number one on the digital sales chart for international artists on South Korea's Gaon Chart, with around 180,000 downloads. On September 26, 2011, the track debuted on the Australian ARIA Charts at number 25 and peaked at the number 1 position following a promotional tour by Clarkson, which included a performance at the 2011 NRL Grand Final and The X Factor. The song reached number 46 on the Australian ARIA End of Year Charts. In the United Kingdom, "Mr. Know It All" debuted at number 6 on October 23, 2011, the same day she performed the single during the third live results show of season 8 of The X Factor. The song rose to and reached its peak of number 4 the following week.

In early 2012, Clarkson and producer Dann Huff remixed the song for the country music format. The single version was given a release date of April 2012, although it had already entered the Hot Country Songs charts at number 59 on the chart dated February 25, 2012.

== Music video ==
=== Background ===
Filming of the music video for the song took place on August 25, 2011, in Nashville and was directed by Justin Francis. Clarkson explained that "The idea behind the video is variety. The whole point of the song that I like is ‘you don’t know a thing about me.' I love that concept because it’s ignorant to think you know everything about a person. There’s many sides to everybody’s personality. We’re kind of doing a variety of different Kellys." The video featured a "wall of doubt" in which headlines about Clarkson such as "Why So Single Kelly?", "Sponsors Drop Kelly Clarkson", "Too Fat", "Music Leaks" and "Kelly has no style" are posted. Clarkson remarked it as "basically all the crap that’s been said about me that’s kind of funny or ridiculous…we’re playing with that…it’s how I handle it…kind of sarcastic and funny." Another feature of the video is Clarkson dressed in a long gown with feathers on her hair which represents freedom. The video premiered on VEVO on September 26, 2011. In an interview with MTV News, Clarkson described herself in the video,

"I think there's that free-spirit side of me, and then there's that feisty performer in me, Then there's the funny side of me. I mean, obviously you have to be funny to have a big giant wall of doubt with actual headlines of your life on the wall. It's a little fun, a little feisty."

The video Clarkson was watching was actually a scene from her previous music video "I Do Not Hook Up", the second single from All I Ever Wanted, which makes a reference to a scene of Cameron Diaz in the film What Happens in Vegas. Further, the fictional internet article featured in the video was taken from the website Kovideo.net; it was edited to avoid plagiarism charges. The article featured a real-life situation in Clarkson's career where several demos of the songs originally recorded for Stronger were leaked into the internet in July 2011. Clarkson responded to the situation by stating "Oh my God, have you ever been robbed? I have. I’ve been physically robbed a couple of times, but this is much worse." later adding "No point in getting angry because there's nothing I can do so I hope (everyone) likes the music."

=== Synopsis and reception ===
Close-up screenshot of the "Wall of Doubt", containing derogatory headlines about Clarkson.

The video features Clarkson singing behind a wall full of newspaper articles, both derogatory and favorable, about Clarkson's music career and personal life. The video continually cuts Clarkson confronting a man as a metaphor for "Mr. Know It All" by singing angrily at him. Throughout the chorus, silhouettes Clarkson's touring band fade into the wall as she sings. The video then features Clarkson watching the music video of her single "I Do Not Hook Up" on a Sony Google TV while reading an internet article about the song leaking into the internet. Clarkson later scans through the comments section and laughs at it sarcastically. The video then depicts Clarkson packing her clothes and accessories in a suitcase then leaves the man behind. The video then features Clarkson, dressed in a velvet dress, singing with feathers on her hair. In the final shot of the video, Clarkson tears some of the newspaper clippings at the wall, creating a hole and revealing a sunny, beautiful valley and a road, similar to the one featured in the music video of Madonna's single "Don't Tell Me", in which Clarkson enters along with her suitcase.

Several of the critics noted the video's approach to media, in which they assumed that the "Mr. Know It All" is an individual man. Brad Wete of Entertainment Weekly, remarked that "It’s interesting how she used the video to kill two birds with one stone. The song itself is about a misinformed individual, but the clip takes a swipe at the media and blogosphere. Personally, I prefer more direct musical approaches—like Michael Jackson’s "Tabloid Junkie.” But Clarkson’s song is cool." VH1 remarked, "When we first heard Kelly Clarkson‘s latest single, “Mr. Know It All,” we figured that, thematically, it was a fairly straightforward kiss off to an ex that did her dirty. However, after watching the video for the song that debuted in the wee hours this morning, it's apparent that there's another target for her ire: The media." adding, "However, it turns that it’s not just old media that’s got Kelly down. The blogs are on her case, too!" and later concluding, "Whether you’re a big music superstar or someone whose only exposure to the rumor mill comes courtesy of Facebook, gossip is unavoidable. How you choose to react to the haters, however, is entirely up to you. You can wallow in their nasty comment sections (or op-ed pages!), but at the end of the day, wouldn’t you rather go outside and see the sunshine? Kelly Clarkson would, that’s for sure." Hollywood.com remarked "Clarkson puts a man (whose face we never see) in his place for thinking that he knows everything about her. While she's a few unicorns and eccentric costumes shy of creating a Katy Perry or Lady Gaga experience, she brings enough sass and glamour to the video to make it worth watching. The lyrics itself are powerful, but her meaningful looks into the camera and bold demand for independence really help to drive the message home."

== Live performances ==
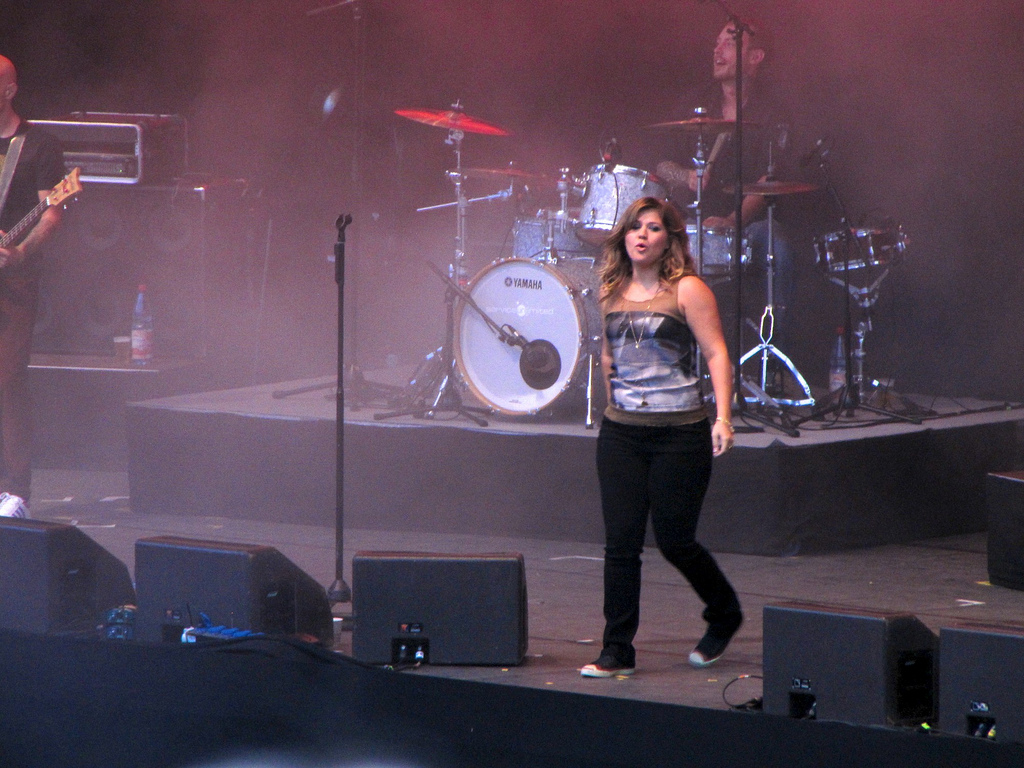
Clarkson performing "Mr. Know It All" Stars for Free music festival in Berlin, Germany, September 2011

Clarkson performed "Mr. Know It All" for the first time on Stars for Free music festival in Berlin, Germany on September 10, 2011. She then performed it on The Tonight Show with Jay Leno on September 20, 2011. Upon hearing Clarkson's performance on The Tonight Show, VH1 remarked, "Clarkson has always had a great voice and an even better sense of how to use it". Clarkson performed the song on The Ellen DeGeneres Show on September 22, 2011, at the iHeartRadio Music Festival in Las Vegas on September 23, 2011, and on the Australian television series The X Factor on September 28, 2011. On October 2, 2011, Clarkson performed the song at the 2011 NRL Grand Final at the ANZ Stadium in Sydney, Australia where she was accompanied by 300 dancers. Clarkson also performed the song on Dancing with the Stars on October 18, 2011, along with her hit Walk Away. Clarkson performed "Mr. Know It All" during the third live results show of season 8 of the British television series The X Factor on October 23, 2011, and is scheduled to perform the song on the U.S. series of The X Factor on November 23, 2011. Clarkson performed the song on The Today Show on October 25, 2011, on The View on October 26, 2011, and on Late Night with Jimmy Fallon on October 28, 2011. Clarkson performed "Mr. Know It All" at the 2011 American Music Awards. On January 7, 2012, she performed it on Saturday Night Live. Clarkson performed the acoustic version of "Mr. Know It All" live on stage during the Sony Keynote at CES 2012 in Las Vegas on January 9, 2012. On June 9, 2012, she performed the song at Wembley Stadium as a part of her setlist of Summertime Ball.

== Credits and personnel ==
Credits adapted from Stronger booklet:

- Kelly Clarkson – vocals
- Ester Dean – co-producer, writer
- Andre Frappier – guitars
- Brett James – writer
- Dante Jones – additional producer, writer
- Brian Kennedy – keyboards, producer, programming
- Brian Seals – writer
- Sean Tallman – recorder
- Dewain Whitmore Jr. – vocal recorder

== Track listing ==
Digital download

1. "Mr. Know It All" – 3:52

Country version/digital

1. "Mr. Know It All" – 3:38

CD single

1. "Mr. Know It All" – 3:52
2. "My Life Would Suck Without You" (Chriss Ortega Radio Mix) – 3:40

UK digital/CD single

1. "Mr. Know It All" (radio edit) – 3:52
2. "My Life Would Suck Without You" (Chriss Ortega Radio Mix) – 3:40

== Charts ==
=== Weekly charts ===
Chart (2011–2012)	Peak position
Australia (ARIA)	1
Austria (Ö3 Austria Top 40)	26
Belgium (Ultratip Bubbling Under Flanders)	6
Belgium (Ultratip Bubbling Under Wallonia)	14
Canada Hot 100 (Billboard)	11
Germany (GfK)	18
Hungary (Editors' Choice Top 40)	27
Iceland (Tónlistinn)	26
Ireland (IRMA)	14
Japan Hot 100 (Billboard)	33
Japan Hot Overseas (Billboard)	5
Japan Adult Contemporary (Billboard)	29
K-Pop Hot 100 (Billboard)	78
Netherlands (Dutch Top 40 Tipparade)	9
Netherlands (Single Top 100)	90
New Zealand (Recorded Music NZ)	8
Poland Airplay (ZPAV)	5
Slovakia Airplay (ČNS IFPI)	34
Scottish Singles Sales (Official Charts)	4
South Korea (Gaon Chart)	1
Switzerland (Schweizer Hitparade)	22
UK Singles (Official Charts)	4
US Billboard Hot 100	10
US Adult Contemporary (Billboard)	4
US Adult Pop Airplay (Billboard)	1
US Hot Country Songs (Billboard)	21
US Pop Airplay (Billboard)	11

=== Year-end charts ===
Chart (2011)	Position
Australia (ARIA)	46
Canada (Canadian Hot 100)	99
UK Singles (Official Charts Company)	97
US Adult Pop Songs (Billboard)	35
US Adult Contemporary (Billboard)	47
US Hot Single Sales (Billboard)	22

Chart (2012)	Position
Canada (Canadian Hot 100)	82
Ukraine Airplay (TopHit)	151
US Adult Pop Songs (Billboard)	20
US Adult Contemporary (Billboard)	13
US Country Songs (Billboard)	91
US Radio Songs (Billboard)	68
US Hot Single Sales (Billboard)	38

== Certifications and sales ==
Region	Certification	Certified units/sales
Australia (ARIA)	3× Platinum	210,000^{^}
Canada (Music Canada)	Platinum	80,000^{*}
New Zealand (RMNZ)	Platinum	15,000^{*}
South Korea (Gaon)	—	569,413
United Kingdom (BPI)	Gold	400,000^{‡}
^{*} Sales figures based on certification alone.^{^} Shipments figures based on certification alone.^{‡} Sales+streaming figures based on certification alone.

== Release history ==
Country	Date	Format	Label
Australia	August 29, 2011	Contemporary Hit Radio	RCA Records
N/A	August 30, 2011	Live Webcast Premiere	RCA Records
United States	September 5, 2011	Digital download	RCA Records
Canada	September 5, 2011	Digital download	Sony Music
France	September 5, 2011	Digital download	Sony Music
Germany	September 5, 2011	Digital download	Sony Music
Australia	September 5, 2011	Digital download	Sony Music
Austria	September 5, 2011	Digital download	Sony Music
Belgium	September 5, 2011	Digital download	Sony Music
Denmark	September 5, 2011	Digital download	Sony Music
Finland	September 5, 2011	Digital download	Sony Music
Greece	September 5, 2011	Digital download	Sony Music
Ireland	September 5, 2011	Digital download	Sony Music
Italy	September 5, 2011	Digital download	Sony Music
Netherlands	September 5, 2011	Digital download	Sony Music
New Zealand	September 5, 2011	Digital download	Sony Music
Norway	September 5, 2011	Digital download	Sony Music
Portugal	September 5, 2011	Digital download	Sony Music
Spain	September 5, 2011	Digital download	Sony Music
Sweden	September 5, 2011	Digital download	Sony Music
Switzerland	September 5, 2011	Digital download	Sony Music
United States	September 12, 2011	Hot/Modern/AC radio	RCA Records
United States	September 13, 2011	Top 40/Mainstream radio	RCA Records
United Kingdom	October 16, 2011	Digital download	RCA Label Group (UK)
Germany	October 21, 2011	CD single	Sony Music
United Kingdom	October 25, 2011	CD single	RCA Label Group (UK)
United States	April 3, 2012	Digital download (country version)	RCA Records
United States	April 23, 2012	Country radio	RCA Records

== See also ==
- List of Billboard Adult Top 40 number-one songs of the 2010s
- List of Billboard Hot 100 top-ten singles in 2011
- List of number-one international songs of 2011 (South Korea)
- List of number-one singles of 2011 (Australia)
- List of UK top-ten singles in 2011
