= List of rap rock bands =

The following is a list of rap rock artists with articles on Wikipedia.

== List ==
=== 0-9 ===
- 311
- 38th Parallel
- 3rd Strike

=== B ===
- Back-On
- Bad Ronald
- Bali Baby
- Beastie Boys
- Bloodhound Gang
- Boondox
- Brougham
- Butterfingers

=== C ===
- The Chimpz
- Chronic Future
- Confrontation Camp
- Corporate Avenger
- Crazy Town

=== D ===
- Da Weasel
- Death Grips
- Dana Dentata
- Down with Webster
- Duke Deuce

=== E ===
- Earthsuit
- El Pus
- Entity Paradigm

=== F ===
- Faith No More
- Fame on Fire
- Fever 333
- Flipsyde
- Flobots
- Fort Minor
- From Ashes to New
- Fun Lovin' Criminals

=== G ===
- Gorillaz
- Gym Class Heroes

=== H ===
- The Hard Corps/ Stone Deep
- Hed PE
- Hollywood Undead

=== I ===
- Insane Clown Posse

=== K ===
- Kid Rock
- Kottonmouth Kings

=== L ===
- Len
- Lil Peep
- Limp Bizkit
- Linkin Park
- Luscious Jackson

=== M ===
- Manafest
- Methods of Mayhem

=== N ===
- New Kingdom
- N.E.R.D.

=== O ===
- Oxymorrons
- Ozomatli

=== P ===
- Papa Roach
- Planet Hemp
- Phunk Junkeez
- Pillar
- Pimpadelic
- P.O.D.
- Pop Will Eat Itself
- Post Malone
- Princess Nokia
- Prophets of Rage

=== Q ===
- Quarashi

=== R ===
- Rage Against the Machine
- Red Hot Chili Peppers
- Rico Nasty
- Rod Laver
- Kevin Rudolf

=== S ===
- Serial Joe
- Shuvel
- Sugar Ray
- SX-10

=== T ===
- Teezo Touchdown
- Tura Satana
- Twenty One Pilots
- Twiztid

=== U ===
- Uncle Kracker
- Urban Dance Squad

=== V ===
- Vanilla Ice

=== W ===
- The White Mandingos

=== Z ===
- Zebrahead

== See also ==
- List of rap metal bands
