= List of rap metal bands =

The following is a list of rap metal artists with articles on Wikipedia.

== List ==
=== 0–9 ===
- 24-7 Spyz
- 28 Days
- 311

=== A ===
- Attila

=== B ===
- Biohazard
- Bloodhound Gang
- Body Count
- Boo-Yaa T.R.I.B.E.

=== C ===
- The Chimpz
- Chronic Future
- Clawfinger
- Crazy Town

=== D ===
- Dana Dentata
- Death Grips
- Def Con Dos
- Dog Eat Dog
- downset.
- DVSR

=== E ===
- E.Town Concrete

=== F ===
- Faith No More
- Falling in Reverse
- Family Force 5
- Fever 333
- Fire from the Gods
- From Ashes to New

=== G ===
- Genuflect
- Greyhoundz

=== H ===
- Hacktivist
- The Hard Corps / Stone Deep
- Hed PE
- Hollywood Undead
- Hot Action Cop

=== I ===
- Incubus
- Insane Clown Posse
- Insolence

=== K ===
- Kid Rock
- Kim Sa-rang
- King 810
- Kottonmouth Kings

=== L ===
- Limp Bizkit
- Linkin Park

=== M ===
- Methods of Mayhem
- Molotov

=== O ===
- One Minute Silence
- Orange 9mm
- Otep

=== P ===
- P.O.D.
- Papa Roach
- Powerflo
- Phunk Junkeez
- Pimpadelic
- Pleymo
- Powerman 5000
- Primer 55
- Prophets of Rage
- Proyecto Eskhata
- Public Enemy

=== R ===
- Rage Against the Machine
- Reveille
- Rise of the Northstar
- Rod Laver

=== S ===
- Saliva
- Salmon
- Senser
- Shootyz Groove
- Shuvel
- Slapshock
- StillWell
- Stuck Mojo
- Suicideboys
- SX-10

=== T ===
- Tallah
- Thousand Foot Krutch
- Tricky
- Tura Satana
- Twiztid

=== U ===
- Urban Dance Squad

=== Z ===
- Zebrahead
- Zero 9:36

== See also ==
- List of rap rock bands
