= Banshee (band) =

American heavy metal band

- Origin: Kansas City, Kansas, U.S.
- Genres: Heavy metal, power metal
- Years active: 1985–1993, 1999–2000, 2008–present
- Labels: Metal Blade, Atlantic, Cabal Records USA
- Members: George Call; Terry Dunn; Chuck Hopkins; Vinnie E. Parma
- Past members: Tommy Lee Flood; Tyson Leslie; Bill Westfall; Kent Burnham
- Website: bansheerocks.com

Banshee is an American heavy metal band that was formed in 1986 in Kansas City, Missouri. Although they shared the image and sound with the glam metal scene of the 80s, their music also displays elements of melodic power metal: catchy guitar riffs, eclectic drums and bass, powerful guitar solos, and intense vocals.

== History ==
Banshee was formed by guitarist Terry Dunn in the spring of 1986. It was made up of members from the popular Midwest touring act Lick (Tommy Lee and Chuck Hopkins); Terry Dunn of Kansas City-based Frodo, Granmax, and Kent Burnham from Kansas City-based Crypt Keeper. By late 1986, they released their first EP entitled Cry in the Night. Hopkins left to pursue other projects in Los Angeles, and was replaced with Kansas City bassist Bill Westfall.

In 1988, Metal Blade Records re-released Cry In The Night and included the song "We Want You" on a compilation record, Metal Massacre No. 9.

In 1989, the band began recording at Record Plant Studios and in September of that year, released their first album, Race Against Time, on Atlantic Records Titanium label. The album was released on vinyl, compact disc, and cassette tape. Banshee left Atlantic Records.

In 1993, the band self-released their second album, Take 'Em by Storm, and disbanded after the initial release.

Reunion shows were played in 1999, 2000, and 2008. After numerous hiatuses throughout the 90s and most of the 2000s, Banshee reunited in 2008 to perform an ill-fated show at Rocklahoma. After that, founder and guitarist Terry Dunn planned drastic changes for the band to continue.

On June 21, 2012, the band released their third studio album entitled Mindslave on Snowblind Records. The album featured vocalist George Call (ASKA, Violent Storm, Omen, Cloven Hoof), original bassist Chuck Hopkins, and drummer Marty Schiermann. After the initial release and in preparation for the Mindslave tour, Hopkins and Schiermann were both unable to tour with the band and Mika Horiuchi (ex-Falling In Reverse and ex-Celador) from Los Angeles, California stepped up on bass, while Vinnie E. Parma (MYSTERY, Hillbilly Orchestra, HONEY) from Dallas, Texas took the role of drums.

In May 2017, Banshee signed to Visionary Noise Records and on July 9, 2019, Banshee's fourth studio album entitled The Madness was released. Visionary Noise Records re-released Mindslave on a limited pressing double-sided picture disc vinyl.

In 2024, Cabal Records reissued Banshee's entire catalogue, and their albums were released as limited edition picture discs.

== Members ==
=== Current ===
- Terry Dunn – guitars (1985–present)
- George Call – vocals (2011 –present)
- Chuck Hopkins – bass (1985–1986, 2008–2014, 2015-present)
- Vinnie E. Parma – drums (2012–present)

=== Former ===
- Tommy Lee Flood – vocals (1985–1993, 1999–2000, 2008–2009)
- Kent Burnham – drums, percussion (1985–1993, 1999–2000, 2008)
- Bill Westfall – bass (1986–1993, 1999–2000, 2014–2015), keyboards (1989) (died 2020)

=== Session members ===
- Tyson Leslie – bass (2008 Rocklahoma Reunion Concert)
- Marty Schiermann – drums (2011–2012 Mindslave Sessions, 2018–2019 The Madness Sessions)
- Mika Kazuo Horiuchi – bass (2012 Tour)
- Blu Davis – bass (2019 Festivals & Whisky A Go-Go)

== Discography ==
=== EPs ===
- Cry in the Night (August 12, 1986)

=== LPs ===
- Race Against Time (September 15, 1989)
- Take 'Em by Storm (1993)
- Mindslave (June 21, 2012)
- The Madness (July 9, 2019)
- Twin Pack (Race Against Time/Cry In The Night) Dual Pack = (October 31, 2024)

=== Demos ===
- "Demo '91" (1991)
- "The Slam" (1991)
