= Satisfied =

Satisfied may refer to:

== Albums ==
- Satisfied (Ashley Monroe album) or the title song, 2009
- Satisfied (David Grisman and John Sebastian album), 2007
- Satisfied (DecembeRadio album), 2008
- Satisfied (Rita Coolidge album), 1979
- Satisfied (Taylor Dayne album) or the title song, 2008
- Satisfied, by Keahiwai, 2002

== Songs ==
- "Satisfied" (Aranda song), 2012
- "Satisfied" (Hamilton song), from the musical Hamilton, 2015
- "Satisfied" (Jewel song), 2010
- "Satisfied" (Richard Marx song), 1989
- "Satisfied" (Squeeze song), 1991
- "Satisfied", by 8stops7 from In Moderation, 1999
- "Satisfied", by the Buzzhorn from Disconnected, 2002
- "Satisfied", by CeeLo Green from The Lady Killer, 2010
- "Satisfied", by Galantis, 2018
- "Satisfied", by Jordan Feliz from Beloved, 2015
- "Satisfied", by Kate Ceberano from Think About It!, 1991
- "Satisfied", by Liz Phair from Funstyle, 2010
- "Satisfied", by Natalie Imbruglia from Counting Down the Days, 2005
- "Satisfied", by Odds from Good Weird Feeling, 1995
- "Satisfied", by Prince from 3121, 2006
- "Satisfied", by Rhona Bennett, 2001
- "Satisfied", by Ringo Starr from Choose Love, 2005
- "Satisfied", by Take That from Take That & Party, 1992
