= The Good Fight (disambiguation) =

The Good Fight is a 2017 American legal drama television series.

The Good Fight or Good Fight may also refer to:

== Film and television ==
- The Good Fight, the 1983 documentary film about the Spanish Civil War
- The Good Fight, a 1992 TV film directed by John David Coles
- "The Good Fight", a 2002 TV episode of Sex and the City
- "Ka Hakaka Maikaʻi" (Hawaiian: The Good Fight), a 2011 episode of Hawaii Five-0

== Literature ==
- The Good Fight, a 1946 autobiography by Manuel L. Quezon
- The Good Fight, a 1973 poetry collection by Thomas Kinsella
- The Good Fight, a 1975 memoir by Louis Waldman
- The Good Fight, a 2006 book by Peter Beinart

== Music ==
=== Albums ===
- The Good Fight (Bizzle album), 2013
- The Good Fight (Oddisee album), 2015
- The Good Fight, a 2015 album by Cory Morrow
- The Good Fight, a 2014 EP by The Exchange
- The Good Fight, a 2007 album by Johnny Panic

=== Songs ===
- "The Good Fight", a song by Jimmy Buffett from the 1981 album Coconut Telegraph
- "The Good Fight", a song by Dashboard Confessional from the 2001 album The Places You Have Come to Fear the Most
- "The Good Fight", a song by Brant Bjork from the 2004 album Local Angel
- "The Good Fight", a song by Phonte from the 2011 album Charity Starts at Home
- "The Good Fight", a song by Rachel Chinouriri from the 2026 album I Think I Spoke Too Soon

== Other uses ==
- Good Fight Entertainment, a business conglomerate

== See also ==
- A Good Fight, an American rock band
- "Fight the Good Fight", a Christian hymn
- New Testament military metaphors
