= We the Ghost =

American post-rock band

We The Ghost
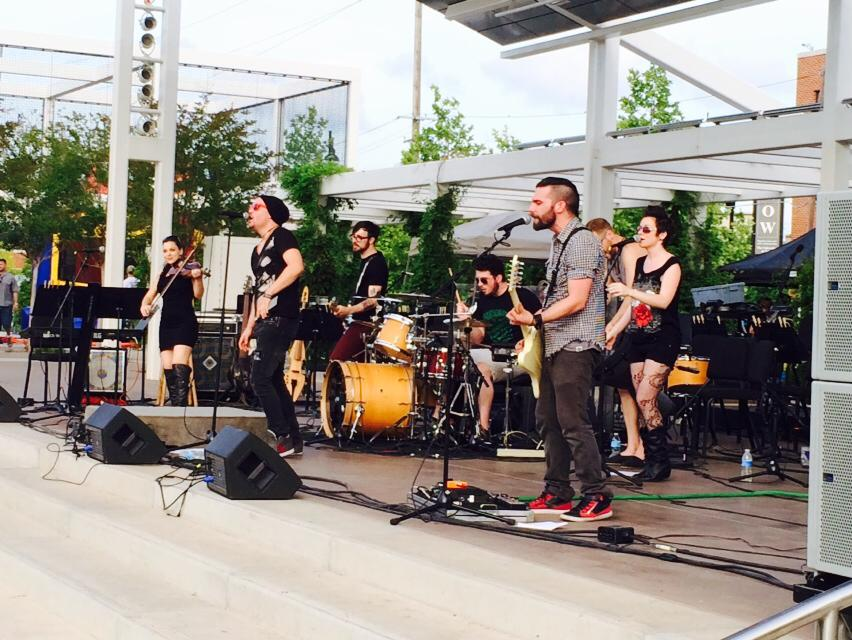

Background information
- Origin: Tulsa, Oklahoma
- Genres: Post-Rock
- Years active: 2012–present
- Labels: The Ghost Collective; Spectra Music Group
- Spinoffs: The X Ohs
- Members: Beau Tyler; Jocelyn Rowland; Dain Samuelson; DJ Jankins
- Website: http://www.wetheghostmusic.com/

We The Ghost is an American post-rock band from Tulsa, Oklahoma, that formed in 2012. The band is composed of lead vocalist, songwriter, and producer Beau Tyler, violinist and singer Jocelyn Rowland Khalaf, percussionist Dain Samuelson, and DJ Jankins.

The band's commercial breakthrough came with the successful release of the single "Let Me Know" from the album A Stereophonic Listening Experience (2016). The album's lead single "Let Me Know" debuted at #4 on the Billboard (magazine) Hot Singles Sales Chart and spent over two months in the top 10. Other songs from the album were also featured heavily in TV shows such as Bad Girls Club, Black Ink Crew, Rogue (TV series), and You Me Her.

== History ==
=== Origin of name ===
The name We The Ghost was decided upon the evening before the band was to appear on a popular morning radio show on Tulsa's 106.9 K-Hits to debut their song "Right Where You Want". Beau had actually originally written the track as the lead single to his previous band, Rock Ridge Music recording act, Rescue Signals sophomore album. Since the album never came out in stores due to the band's departure from the label, it served a starting point for We The Ghost. As the band stated in an interview with Urban Tulsa Weekly, they were text messaging each other band name ideas and somehow settled on the name merely because of time constraints before the upcoming radio interview that would ultimately introduce the band to the Tulsa, OK market.

=== Formation (2012–2016) ===
We The Ghost formed in their original incarnation in Tulsa, Oklahoma, in 2011 but officially announced their formation in January 2012. Originally performing under the name The Sweet Carolina, singer and songwriter Beau Tyler and djimbe player Dain Samuelson, who had been best friends since grade school, added Jimmy Dean Adams on the bass guitar with the original intent of performing as an acoustic trio. However, as the vision quickly grew beyond the limitations of an acoustic trio, Jimmy Adams transitioned from bass guitar to drums as the band changed their name to We The Ghost, developed a new sound more in line with Tyler's original vision, and added guitarist Matt McHan and violinist Jocelyn Rowland to the lineup. The group played their first show on January 27, 2012, in Tulsa, OK at Fisbonz as main support for the band RadioRadio. Until January 2014, when bassist Calvin Berkenbile joined the band, We The Ghost performed with a series of hired bass players for public performances. Among such bass player's was famed local musician Eric Arndt of the band The Hero Factor. Eric also performed all bass guitar parts on the band's "White Noise" EP. As of April 2014 according to the band's Facebook page and website, original drummer Jimmy Dean Adams was no longer listed as the band's drummer and has officially been replaced by drummer Bradley Jones. No official statement for the change has been made.

On Friday, May 2, 2014, lead singer Beau Tyler announced via the band's website that We The Ghost had already entered the studio with producer Rockwell Ripperger to begin working on their upcoming single "So Much Left to Say", a collaboration with fellow Tulsa, OK singer Kristen Goss, as well as additional news of plans to begin recording their newest album immediately after completion of the single.

After working on the limited-release single "So Much Left to Say" with Ripperger, who produced the band's first two albums "White Noise" and "Sinking Suspicion" the band ultimately elected to have singer Beau Tyler produce the band's album "The Kids Can't Dance". The album was released via CD and digital download on September 16, 2014 and ultimately helped the band to win "Musical Group of the Year" as well as being nominated for, but ultimately losing, "Pop Album of the Year" in December 2014 at the Los Angeles Music Awards at the Avalon Theater in Hollywood, CA. According to an interview with the Tulsa World newspaper, the independent success of "The Kids Can't Dance" also ultimately led to the band's signing with Spectra Records in December, 2014.

In May 2015 We The Ghost began a string of high-profile touring and festival shows beginning with a headlining performance on the Axis Stage at Rocklahoma Music Festival.

2015 has proved to be a year of breakthroughs as well as change for We The Ghost. In June 2015, thanks in part to major national exposure brought on after signing a deal with Dr Pepper to be one of the faces of the One Of A Kind Sound project. Later the same month the band announced that it would be parting ways with longtime friend and bassist, Calvin Berkenbile. According to the band's Facebook page and website, Todd Shaver has taken over duties as the band's bass player.

In July 2016 We The Ghost's long-awaited label debut LP "A Stereophonic Listening Experience" was released through Spectra Music Group. The album's lead single "Let Me Know" peaked at #4 on Billboard Magazine's Hot Singles Sales Chart. The Song "Come Down", also from the album, was featured in episode #108 of You Me Her on AT&T and Audience Network. In August 2016 it was announced that bassist Todd Shaver had left the band to spend more time with his family after recent health problems regarding his mother.

In November 2016 the band performed what many fans believed might be their final acoustic-concert at The Hunt Club in Tulsa, OK to a small but sold-out crowd. While the band filmed this concert for an upcoming DVD, the performance has never been released to the public.

=== Hiatus (2017) ===
Despite plans to complete a sixth studio album, on September 1, 2017, lead singer Beau Tyler took to the band's website and social networks to announce the unexpected news that the band had decided to call it quits. The following statement was issued:

So this is it. The most bittersweet message we've ever had to write. While we are all still best friends/family and will undoubtedly continue playing with one another in future projects, we have decided to call curtains for We The Ghost.

We know that many of you were expecting another album, but sadly that will not be happening. Honestly, the fire that is needed to go through the recording process and everything that goes along with promoting the record just isn't there any longer. It happens. To us, we feel like it means that we've said everything we wanted to say. Now, we are all excited for our next musical endeavors (we will keep you all updated).

In the last 6 years we have released 5 albums, traveled across the country to sold-out shows, made some amazing friends (you), heard our songs on TV shows and radio stations across the U.S., have looked in awe as we saw our name on the Billboard charts, and won awards we hardly felt worthy of winning. We have done absolutely everything we set out to do and so much more, but if we are being honest, while we are so proud of what we've all accomplished together, we are far more grateful for the amazing experiences we've shared with one another as people.

Here's the thing about ghosts. They're all just souls searching for something to set them free. Fortunately, the members of this band found each other in the moments of our lives when we needed each other the most. While together as a band we have endured divorces and experienced the joy of marriage. We have lost parents and seen the birth of our children. We have battled everything from depression to addiction and have come out on top every single time for one reason; we've had one another to overcome everything and each time we've come out on the other side as better people. While I'll always cherish the music we've made as much as any music I'll ever release, nothing will ever matter more to me than the relationships we've all built with one another.

Before we sign out, I'd like to leave you with a lyric from the final WTG song I ever wrote, as the lyrics seem fitting:

“Sometimes something has to die so that it can stay beautiful. Sometimes, when you've said everything you have to say, the only thing left is silence.”

So that's it. From the bottom of our jet black hearts, thank you.

Peace, Love, & Music.

Beau Tyler

We The Ghost

=== Reformation and new music (2018 - current) ===
On March 22, 2018, after over 17 months since the band last shared a stage together a cryptic post was made across the band's website and social networks that simply said "WTG: 2012 to...". Additionally, on the homepage of We The Ghost's website, a Friends themed meme was posted with the character of Ross that stated: "When in doubt yell: we were on a break." This quickly led to speculation of a reunion. No official confirmation or denial has yet been made by the band.

On March 31, 2018, the band's social networks and website were reactivated. Additionally, the band made yet another, yet less cryptic post via their Facebook profile and website promising "huge news" to be announced soon. All of the band's platforms featured a newly branded logo.

On April 20, 2018, after weeks of cryptic posts We The Ghost officially announced their reformation, the release of a new single, plans to complete two new albums in 2018, and their hopes to return to the stage by late 2018. After confirming that founding members Beau Tyler, Jocelyn Rowland Khalaf, Dain Samuelson, and Matt McHan would be returning the group also added that new member Kylie Wells, a DJ from the band's hometown of Tulsa, OK, would be joining the group to round out the lineup.

The single "With Someone Like You" was released across all digital platforms on May 11, 2018, to positive critical reception. Approach Music said about the song "Drawing from the same rhythmic hook-centric songwriting and orchestral infused production that saw their last album “A Stereophonic Listening Experience” peak as high as number 4 on Billboard's Hot Singles Sales Chart, the similarities to the band's previous releases seem to end there. This is truly a giant creative leap forward for a band that many had thought already hit their stride." Reception from fans were equally positive. While the song was not available for official download until May 11th, 2018, the song had quietly and without promotion been posted to the band's SoundCloud page for 2 weeks and gained over 6,000 streams, as well as hundreds of reposts and likes prior to the official release.

Only 9 days later, on May 20th, 2018, We The Ghost unexpectedly announced the release of yet another single set to be released on June 1st, 2018, entitled "I'm On Fire". The band's website stated "Our new song "I'm On Fire" would be available everywhere music is streamed or downloaded. A big thanks to our friend Rich Gable for bringing his saxophone skills to the studio for this one."

On June 29, 2018 the band released their third single of the year entitled "Such A Fool" via over 50 online platforms such as Apple Music, Spotify, SoundCloud, and more. The song was originally co-written by We The Ghost singer Beau Tyler and violinist Jocelyn Rowland shortly after the release of the "A Stereophonic Listening Experience" album but was never released due to the band's hiatus.

On October 5, 2018, We The Ghost released "Love Ain't Enough", their fourth of the year once again to all online music outlets such as Apple Music, Spotify, SoundCloud and more. The song was written and produced by We The Ghost singer Beau Tyler in the summer of 2018 and was released very soon after.

On July 8, 2019, a post was a made on the band's website explaining the reason for the band's delayed return to the stage. It had been revealed that We The Ghost had parted ways with founding member, Matt McHan, and was moving forward as a 4-piece band. The message, written by lead singer/songwriter Beau Tyler, stated the following:

"In 2019, We The Ghost announced that the band had resumed work on new material and planned to return to live performances following the release of four singles in 2018, their first recordings since the 2016 album A Stereophonic Listening Experience. The announcement also confirmed the departure of co-founder Matt McHan, who left the band to focus on pursuits outside of music. The remaining founding members - Jocelyn Rowland Khalaf, Dain Samuelson, and Beau Tyler stated their intention to continue creating music and performing as We The Ghost..

While originally DJ Kylie Wells was listed as a member of the band as of July 2019 the long-time friend and collaborator DJ Jankins, AKA Anferni Jankins, has recently been listed on the band's website as the newest member of the band. No reason has been given for the lineup change.

=== Notable appearances ===
Since 2012 the band has performed alongside bands such as OneRepublic, Neon Trees, Mute Math, Interpol, Imagine Dragons, Aranda (band), and has performed at major music festivals such as Sundance Film Festival, South By Southwest, Indie Music Festival in Las Vegas, Rocklahoma, Center of the Universe Festival, Free Tulsa Music Festival, the Tulsa State Fair, and the Texas State Fair. We The Ghost has also performed on several television performances in the Oklahoma area such as Fox 23's Great Day Green Country, KSBI's Oklahoma Live, and ABC's channel 8 morning show.

== Work with organizations ==
Three member's in We The Ghost have had parents pass away from cancer while in the band. Additionally, bassist Calvin Berkenbile, is himself a cancer survivor having had Leukemia as a child. Because of this We The Ghost works closely with organizations focusing on cancer research such as Cancer Sucks. In 2013 the band performed at the organization's annual concert and helped to raise money for over 900 days of continued cancer research at Ohio University. The band again worked with the organization on May 10, 2014, with co-headliners Red and Drowning Pool.

== Awards and recognition ==
- Outstanding Live Musical Group (2016 Hollywood Producer's Choice Honors)
- Outstanding Producer, Composer & Arranger - Beau Tyler solo award (2016 Hollywood Producer's Choice Honors)
- Musical Group of the Year (2014 Los Angeles Music Awards)
- Rock Album of the Year (2013 Los Angeles Music Awards)
- Band of the Year (2013 A.B.o.T. Awards)
- Album of the Year (2013 A.B.o.T. Awards)
- Best Male Vocalist - Beau Tyler solo award (2013 A.B.o.T. Awards)
- Best Indie Band (2012 A.B.o.T. Awards)
- Best Song for "Let Me Know" (2012 A.B.o.T. Awards)
- Best Male Vocalist - Beau Tyler solo award (2012 A.B.o.T. Awards)

== Side Projects ==
In October 2017, Beau Tyler and Jocelyn Rowland, who between the two wrote all We The Ghost songs, announced that they had formed a new band, The X Ohs, with long-time friend, Meggie McDonald. Shortly after We The Ghost's reunion The X Ohs officially disbanded.

On November 30, 2018, Beau Tyler co-released the song "Teaching A Narwhal Empathy" with the band Cliffdiver under his production pseudonym, FutureGhost. The same day, via his website, he released 4 new songs for an online EP entitled "Part 1: The Misadventures of FutureGhost.

== Band members ==
Current Lineup

- Beau Tyler – lead vocals, songwriter, guitar, synths (2012–current)
- Jocelyn Rowland – violin, backing vocals (2012–current)
- Dain Samuelson – djembe (2012–current)
- DJ Jankins – DJ (2019–current)

Past members

- Matt McHan - lead guitar, backing vocals (2012–2019)
- Kristen Goss - keys, backing vocals (2014–2016)
- Bradley Jones - drums, backing vocals (2014–2016)
- Matt Barret - drums(2014–2014)
- Jimmy Adams – drums (2012–2014)
- Todd Shaver - bass guitar (2015–2016)
- Calvin Berkenbile - bass guitar, backing vocals (2014–2015)
- Bennett Mosier - bass guitar (2013–2014)
- Eric Arndt - bass guitar (2012–2013)

== Discography ==
Full-length albums (LP)

- A Stereophonic Listening Experience (2016)
- Sinking Suspicion (2013)

Extended play albums (EP)

- The Kids Can't Dance (2014)
- White Noise (2012)
- My Mixtape Summer (2012)

Singles

- Love Ain't Enough (2018)
- Such a Fool (2018)
- I'm On Fire (2018)
- With Someone Like You (2018)
- Let Me Know (2015)
- Sinking Suspicion (2013)

== Music videos ==
- Let Me Know (2015)
- Sinking Suspicion (2013)

== Live videos ==
- Letters to God - Live & Unplugged (2015)
- Letters to God (2015)
- We'll Sleep When We're Dead (2015)
