= Whyyawannabringmedown =

Single by Aranda

from the album Aranda
- Released: July 1, 2009
- Genre: Punk rock
- Length: 2:42
- Label: Astonish
- Songwriter(s): Sam Watters, Louis Biancaniello, Dameon Aranda
- Producer(s): Sam Watters, Louis Biancaniello

Aranda singles chronology
"Still in the Dark" (2008)	"Whyyawannabringmedown" (2009)	"Undone" (2011)

"Whyyawannabringmedown" is a song recorded by American rock band Aranda, from their debut studio album, Aranda (2008). Written by Dameon Aranda with co-writing and co-production by Sam Watters and Louis Biancaniello, the song was released as the album's second and final single through Astonish Entertainment on July 1, 2009.

== Background and reception ==
"Whyyawannabringmedown" was written by Dameon Aranda, Sam Watters, and Louis Biancaniello, with the latter two handling the production. It was originally intended to be recorded for their pop-oriented album in 2001. But after losing their recording contract with Sony Music before the album was released, Aranda instead leaned for a rock-oriented direction for their self-titled album, Aranda, which was independently released in 2008. "Whyyawannabringmedown" was released as the album's second single after being used by the World Wrestling Entertainment (WWE) as the official theme song for their professional wrestling pay-per-view event, The Bash on June 28, 2009. Upon its release, Axel Thunderflex of Sputnikmusic praised the song as "upbeat and catchy enough to make you want to stand up and dance."

== Track listing ==
Digital download

No.	Title	Writer(s)	Length
1.	"Whyyawannabringmedown"	Sam Watters, Louis Biancaniello, Dameon Aranda	2:42

== Charts ==
Chart (2009)	Peak position
US Hot Mainstream Rock Tracks (Billboard)	25
US Active Rock Songs (Billboard)	26

== Kelly Clarkson version ==
In 2008, Watters played tracks from the Aranda album for American recording artist Kelly Clarkson, with whom he was collaborating the time. Clarkson, in turn, expressed interest in recording some of them for her fourth studio album, All I Ever Wanted (2009). She chose to record the song along with "All I Ever Wanted", with the latter receiving a single release in 2010. Clarkson's version of "Whyyawannabringmedown" was also produced by Watters and Biancaniello, with Aranda providing background vocals. It received positive and mixed reviews, with many praising her delivery but feeling like the song itself was overproduced.

LA Times editor Ann Powers wrote that "Whyyouwannabringmedown" gives Clarkson "a chance to howl the way she's wanted to since her grunge-loving teen years." Allmusic's Stephen Thomas Erlewine stated that Clarkson "touches on her hard rock infatuation and improves it, particularly on the bubblegum punk "Whyyawannabringmedown." PopMatters praised the track, saying that "the punky “Whyyawannabringmedown” feels like one of the few songs where Clarkson is allowed to let her freak flag fly, and amidst the stop-start guitars that chug around her, Clarkson's rock-ready wail makes her sound like a dead ringer for Tia Carrere's character in Wayne's World." In a more negative review, Billboard editor Elle J Small called the song "a giant mistake", saying that "when Clarkson delves in to punk/thrash territory on Whyyawannabringmedown- purists will despair and KC fans will be perplexed." Jody Rosen of Rolling Stone praised her vocal delivery and described the song as "a kind of AM-radio punk". Slant Magazine's Jonathan Keefe wrote that "her throat-shredding punk snarl on "Whyyawannabringmedown" is a whole lot more fun than it is convincing" and described the song as a "P!nk reject". Claire Lobenfeld of Vibe stated that “Whyyouwannabringmedown” is the album's most confusing cut. The song's lyrics fit in with the rest of Clarkson's catalogue, but between her yelps and wails and the power chord progression, it comes off like a product of Fisher Price's My First Punk Rock Song."
