= Celebrity Deathmatch (soundtrack) =

Soundtrack album by Various artists
- Released: November 2, 1999
- Recorded: 1999
- Genres: Alternative rock Alternative metal Hip hop
- Length: 58:43
- Label: Interscope Records
- Producers: Marilyn Manson; Fredwreck; Soopafly; Bass Brothers; Powerman 5000; Prince Paul; Jay Jay French; Kool Keith; Rob Zombie; DJ Lethal; Primus

Singles from Celebrity Deathmatch
- 1. "Astonishing Panorama of the Endtimes" Released: November 16, 1999

Professional ratings
Review scores
Source	Rating
AllMusic	3/5 stars

Celebrity Deathmatch is the soundtrack to the MTV American stop-motion animated television series Celebrity Deathmatch. Released on November 2, 1999, by Interscope Records, the soundtrack consisted of a blend of alternative rock and hip hop. The soundtrack featured Marilyn Manson's Grammy-nominated single "Astonishing Panorama of the Endtimes".

== Track listing ==
No.	Title	Writer(s)	Artist	Length
1.	"Astonishing Panorama of the Endtimes"	John 5 (music); Marilyn Manson (lyrics)	Marilyn Manson	3:29
2.	"Celebrity Deathmatch"	Alvin Joiner, Eric Banks	Xzibit	2:54
3.	"My Fault" (Pizza Mix)	Jeff Bass, Mark Bass, Marshall Mathers	Eminem	3:59
4.	"Standing 8"	Powerman 5000 (music); Spider One (lyrics)	Powerman 5000	3:37
5.	"I'll Bust 'Em, You Punish 'Em"	Germaine Williams, William Griffin, Jr., Mike "Punch" Harper	Rakim and Canibus	3:39
6.	"Clean Slate"	Todd Ray	Shuvel	4:54
7.	"Terminator" (Breathe Remix)	Sevendust	Sevendust	4:36
8.	"Secret Wars" (Prince Paul Mix)	Jamal Gray, Paul Huston, Rhamel Richardson	Last Emperor and Prince Paul	5:10
9.	"Vampire"	Naked, Doug McCarvell, Peter Karroll	Bif Naked	4:42
10.	"Let's Go All the Way" (cover of Sly Fox, 1986)	Gary "Mudbone" Cooper	The Wondergirls	4:25
11.	"Bow to the Masta"	Keith Thornton	Kool Keith	4:10
12.	"Meet the Creeper" (Brute Man & Wonder Girl Mix)	Zombie, Scott Humphrey (music); Zombie (lyrics)	Rob Zombie and DJ Lethal	3:32
13.	"The Heckler"	Larry LaLonde, Les Claypool, Tim Alexander	Primus	3:40
14.	"No Good"	Raile	Liars Inc.	2:59
15.	"Money"	A. Jay Popoff, Jeremy Popoff	Lit	2:57
Total length:				58:43
