= Aranda (album) =

Studio album by Aranda
- Released: April 22, 2008
- Genre: Hard rock, post-grunge
- Length: 42:15
- Label: Astonish Entertainment
- Producer: Craig Alvin, Louis Biancaniello, Neil Robins, Sam Watters

Aranda chronology
| Aranda (2008) | Stop the World (2012) |

Aranda is the debut studio album by the hard rock band Aranda. It was released in 2008 on Astonish Entertainment.

== Track listing ==
| No. | Title | Length |
|---|---|---|
| 1. | "Punish Me" | 3:06 |
| 2. | "It Ain't Easy" | 4:17 |
| 3. | "Whyyawannabringmedown" | 2:42 |
| 4. | "All I Ever Wanted" | 3:50 |
| 5. | "Still in the Dark" | 3:45 |
| 6. | "Waiting on a Sign" | 2:50 |
| 7. | "Testify" | 4:13 |
| 8. | "Hooked on You" | 3:57 |
| 9. | "Another Day" | 4:33 |
| 10. | "Do You Feel" | 3:32 |
| 11. | "Gravity" | 5:30 |
| Total length: | | 42:15 |

== Singles ==
| Year | Song | US Main. |
|---|---|---|
| 2008 | "Still in the Dark" | 31 |
| 2009 | "Whyyawannabringmedown" | 25 |
