= Swampfox Entertainment Complex =

Amphitheater in Marion, South Carolina, US

- Interactive map of Swampfox Entertainment Complex
- Former names: Carolina Amphitheater (–2009)
- Location: 1548 S. Highway 501, Marion, South Carolina, 29571
- Coordinates: 34°8′27″N 79°21′57″W
- Owner: Robert Hartmann
- Capacity: 6,909
- Type: Amphitheater

Construction
- Closed: 2021

The Swampfox Entertainment Complex was an amphitheater in Marion, South Carolina, United States. The space has been vacant since 2009, with Hartmann Group of Connecticut reopening the venue on May 8, 2015. The facility, previously known as the Carolina Amphitheater, had over 7,000 fixed seats with additional seating on the lawn.

The first event at the facility was the Swamp Fox Biker Bash, starring Scott Weiland, Molly Hatchet and The Chimpz.

The venue struggled to attract events due to weather and other issues. In 2020, Hartmann announced the removal of the amphitheater and the development of the property as a residential community oriented to retirees with retail and other components. A bar on the complex continued to operate until March 2021.
