= The Chimpz =

American rock band

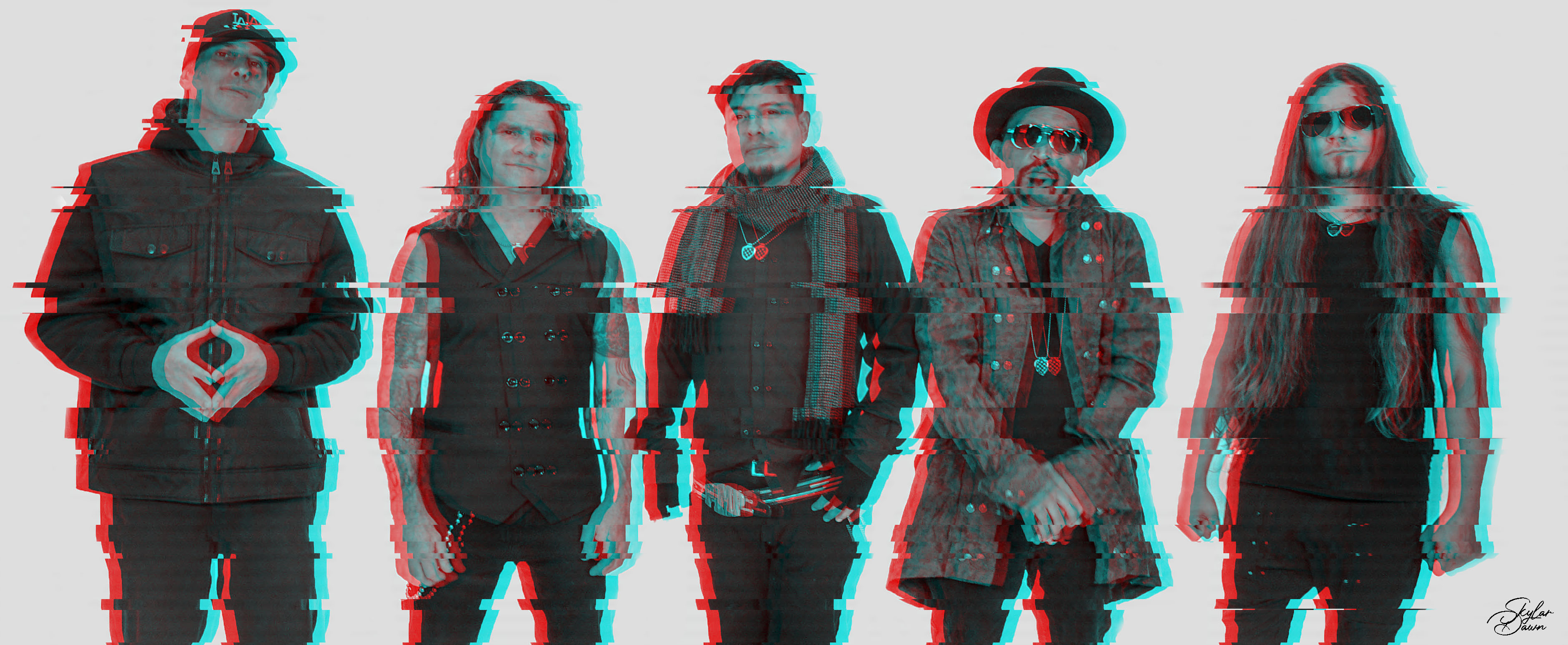

Background information
- Origin: Los Angeles, California, U.S.
- Genres: Rap, rock, metal, punk, crossover
- Years active: 2005–present
- Label: Rock Solid Talent
- Members: Artimus Prime; Shawn Lyon; Chuck Preston; Sean Topham; Doug Weiand
- Past members: Henry Atkets; Mario Cadenes; Thomas Nave; Scary Cary
- Website: thechimpz.com

The Chimpz are an American rap rock/metal/punk band from Los Angeles, California.

== History ==
=== On Parole ===
The Chimpz were formed in Los Angeles, California in 2005 with Artimus Prime on rhythm guitar, Mario Cadenes on lead guitar, Thomas "Cuzzit" Nave on bass guitar and Sean Topham on drums. Chuck Preston joined the ensemble shortly thereafter. Two years later in September, the ensemble released their debut studio album entitled On Parole via their own record label called Chimpz Music Worldwide. All Access Magazine describes the vocals as "intense [with] lyrics [that] are intelligent and insightful, yet never simplistic or pretentious", going on to say that "The lyrics will make you think" and "will make you question your life and your values". After the album was released, Henry Atkets took over on lead guitar.

=== Home Invasion ===
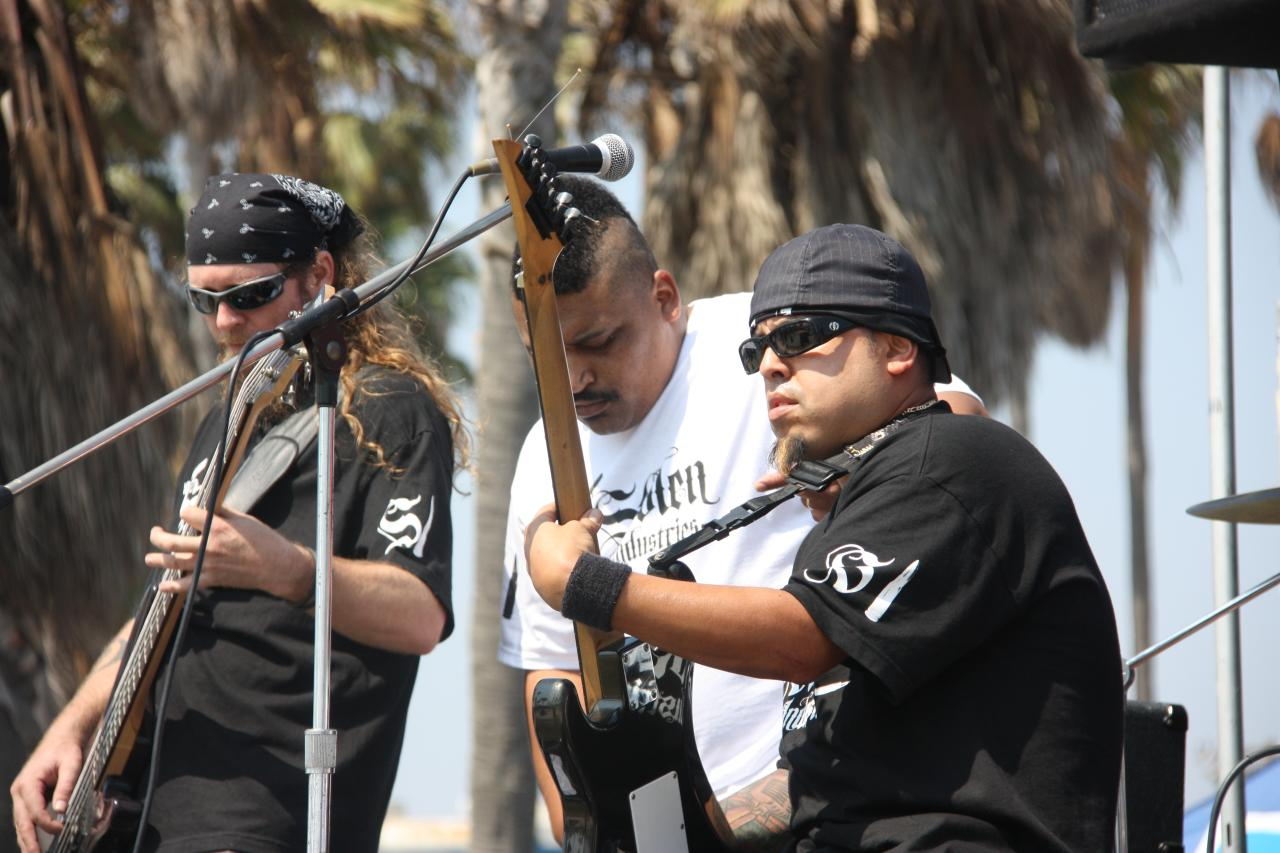
The Chimpz performing in 2009

In early 2010, the group published their first EP, entitled Home Invasion, which was the second release from the band. The title track from the album was featured on "SO", the first episode from Season 3 of American FX Network television show Sons of Anarchy. In the month following, the ensemble performed at Nightrocker:Live in San Antonio, Texas during the South by Southwest music festival. Later that year, the band performed at Uproar Festival while touring the western and south central United States in support of the EP.

=== Who Can I Trust ===
In November 2011, the quintet released their second EP titled Who Can I Trust, produced by Ryan Greene. Matt Crane of Hellhound Music describes the EP as "a fresh mix of rap, punk, and rock: all of which are impressively synergized into an effective showcase of the musical talent behind The Chimpz". "Mr. 44", the first single from the EP, whose video was published in December 2011, was featured on "Stolen Huffy", the fourth episode from Season 5 of Sons of Anarchy. The title track was the second music video from the EP. Directed by David Finkelstein, the clip was produced by Deja vu Productions and published in March 2012. "Victim", the third single from the EP, was released in November 2012, accompanied by a music video for the song directed by Michael Valentino. In mid 2013, the band played Rocklahoma, an annual three-day hard rock music festival held in Pryor, Oklahoma.

=== The Chimpz EP ===
Several months later, the ensemble released "War Machine", the first single planned for The Chimpz, their self-titled EP. In April 2014, a lyric video for the song was published via PureGrainAudio.

In the month following, the band performed at Rocklahoma 2014 and revealed "Battlegrounds", the official theme song for BattleGrounds MMA, a Tulsa, Oklahoma Mixed Martial Arts organization. In June 2014, the quintet performed the track as they walked to the sparring cage at the Battlegrounds O.N.E. Tournament which was held in the BOK Center.

In August 2014, the group released a music video for "California", the second single off of the same EP. One month later, the EP, which was produced at Validus Recordings by Ryan Greene, was released. That same month, "Right to Left", a song from the EP, was featured on "Toil and Till", the second episode from Season 7 of Sons of Anarchy.

In May 2015, the band is scheduled to perform at both the Swampfox Biker Bash in Myrtle Beach and Rocklahoma 2015. In the month following, the ensemble is also scheduled to perform at the Loudwire Music Festival in Colorado.

In early 2016, the group performed on Lucha Underground and announced that they were working on a new album.

In November 2016, Curtis announced that he was taking an "extended hiatus" from the group. In April 2017, Doug Weiand was recruited as a guitarist for the band.

== Members ==
=== Current members ===
- Artimus Prime – lead guitar, lead vocals
- Shawn Everett "Sonic" Lyon – bass
- Sean Topham – percussion
- Doug Weiand – guitar
- Christopher Leigh "Chuck Preston" Curtis – hip-hop vocals

=== Former members ===
- Henry Atkets – lead guitar
- Mario Cadenes – lead guitar
- Thomas Nave – bass
- Cary Singman – lead guitar

== Discography ==
=== Studio albums ===
- On Parole (2006)

=== EPs ===
- Home Invasion (2010)
- Who Can I Trust (2011)
- The Chimpz (2014)

=== Singles ===
- "War Machine" (2014)
- "Not Enough" (2020)

== In popular culture ==
Music from the ensemble has been featured on FX Channel's Sons of Anarchy, in the MTV show Bam's Unholy Union, and in films such as Where the #$&% is Santa? and Dezert People 8.
