= Stop the World (Aranda album) =

Studio album by Aranda
- Released: January 31, 2012
- Genre: Hard rock, post-grunge
- Length: 34:40
- Label: Wind-up
- Producer: Johnny K

Aranda chronology
Aranda (2008)	Stop the World (2012)	Not The Same (2015)

Stop the World is the second studio album by American rock band Aranda. The album was released digitally on January 31, 2012, and as a CD on February 14, 2012. It was re-released on October 16, 2012. It includes the single "Undone", and other songs such as "One More Lie" and "Satisfied".

== Background ==
Grammy award-winning producer Johnny K contacted Aranda about working with them.

== Critical reception ==
Gene Triplett of The Oklahoman commented on the record, calling it "worth the four-year wait, for its certainly worth its sonic weight in gold, bringing on a 10-song load of the kind of hard-edged, guitar-driven, melodic, made-to-be-played-loud music that distinguished their 2008 self-titled debut". The album has sold 30,000 copies as of 2015.

== Track listing ==
No.	Title	Length
1.	"The Upside of Vanity"	3:30
2.	"Undone"	3:47
3.	"Stop the World"	3:13
4.	"Satisfied"	3:23
5.	"One More Lie"	3:36
6.	"Stand"	3:27
7.	"Love Hitchhiker"	3:13
8.	"Hey Sally"	3:43
9.	"Break Away"	3:22
10.	"The Rest of My Life"	3:26
Total length:		34:40

=== Singles ===
Year	Song	US Main.
2011	"Undone"	24
2012	"Satisfied"	16
2012	"One More Lie"	15
