= Pimpadelic =

American rock band

- Origin: Fort Worth, Texas
- Genres: Rap metal; rap rock; Southern rock
- Years active: 1992–2000s, 2011–2015
- Labels: Crystal Clear Sound, Tommy Boy, Down·Rite·Rotten
- Past members: Easy Jesus Coe, Madison, Dirty K, Cha-Chi R.Cola, D.J. M I A, Mile High, Lo-C, King E. Capone

Pimpadelic was a Fort Worth, Texas–based rock band.

== History ==
Pimpadelic was founded in 1992 in Fort Worth, Texas by vocalist Donnie Franks (a.k.a. "Easy Jesus") and drummer Charles Winchell (a.k.a. "Madison"), both of whom had grown up in the nearby town of Blue Mound. The band's lineup changed multiple times over the next four years before eventually stabilizing as Sean "D.J.-M.I.A." Baker, Brandon Kord "Dirty K" Murphy (vocalist), and E.J. "Cha-Chi R.Cola" Cernosek Jr (bass). Their debut album, Barely Legal, was released on the local label Crystal Clear Sound in 1996, followed by Statutory Rap on the same label in 1998.

In April 2000, their third studio album and major-label debut, Southern Devils, was released by Tommy Boy Records, after previously having been released locally. The band promoted the album by posing in fur suits and fedoras. Soon after the album's release, Murphy violated the terms of his probation (he had previously pleaded guilty to a second-degree felony charge for his role in a robbery in 1996). This prompted the band to announce that they were looking for a replacement for him for their upcoming tour, where they performed with the Kottonmouth Kings and Corporate Avenger. Murphy subsequently left the band. In 2002, it was reported that Pimpadelic had been dropped from Tommy Boy's roster; Zac Crain of the Dallas Observer wrote that "From the looks of it, it's a you're-fired-no-screw-you-I-quit situation, though it's unclear who decided to walk out first." Crain also reported that Pimpadelic was still working on their next album and talking to other labels about releasing it.

Murphy was found dead in a rehearsal space in 2011. Also that year, the band released a new album entitled Drink! Drugs! Sex!, which Anthony Mariani of Fort Worth Weekly described as "...a widget from an assembly line manned grudgingly by David Allan Coe, GG Allin’s ghost, and Mötley Crüe (yes, the whole band)." It was followed by the 2015 double album Greatest Tits.

== Critical reception ==
Southern Devils received an unfavorable review from Orlando Weekly, which described the band's style as "...Southern rock that doesn't boogie, metal that wouldn't scare an 'N Sync fan, and witless, flowless rhyme schemes that make Bloodhound Gang sound like the Wu-Tang Clan." Robert Christgau also reviewed the album unfavorably, giving it a D+ grade and describing the band as "been-and-gone scumbags". Multiple critics compared the album's sound unfavorably to that of Kid Rock's music. The Austin Chronicle's Christopher Gray was more favorable in his review of the album, giving it 3 stars (out of 4) and writing that the band's "...constant t&a references, plus allusions to such savory subjects as gonorrhea, crystal meth, and the Trenchcoat Mafia, would probably be best appreciated by those who can't get enough of Dolemite and the Diceman's comic stylings."

== Discography ==
- Barely Legal (1996)
- Statutory Rap (1998)
- Southern Devils (1999)
- For Music! For Video! For Porn! (1999)
- Southern Devils (2000) Tommy Boy
- Reb De Ville (2003)
- Do Unto Others (2004)
- Texas Hold'em Up (2005)
- Rebelution - Two Thousand Six Sixx Sixxx (2006)
- She's Dead (2008)
- Drink! Drugs! Sex! (2010)
- Greatest Tits: The Very Worst of Pimpadelic (2015)
