= Dana Dentata =

Canadian rapper, musician and model

- Born: Dana Wright; 23 July 1990 (age 36); Toronto, Ontario, Canada
- Genres: Rap metal; hip-hop; horrorcore; rap rock
- Occupations: Rapper, musician, model, stripper (former)
- Formerly of: Dentata
- Partner: Ronnie Radke: 2025-present Ghostemane: 2019

Dana Wright, also known as Dana Dentata (born 23 July 1990) is a Canadian rapper, musician and model. A former stripper and frontwoman of a metal band, Dentata became known for fusing shock rock and horrorcore on her 2021 debut album Pantychrist. With surviving sexual violence and women's empowerment as central themes of her rapping, Dentata was cosigned by Kanye West and Marilyn Manson in 2018, and has toured with groups including Korn and Evanescence.

== Early life ==
Dentata was born in Toronto, Ontario, Canada. She was raised in the nearby suburb of Etobicoke.

== Career ==
Dentata started her career as a stripper, and initially performed with a metal band called Dentata. Her stage name comes from the myth of the vagina dentata, which is Latin for "toothed vagina". In 2020, Dentata became the first female artist signed to Roadrunner Records. Her debut solo album, Pantychrist, was released in 2021 to positive critical reviews.

In January 2022, Dentata's legal team sent a cease and desist notice to Lil Nas X, whose real name is Montero Lamar Hill, for allegedly violating copyrighted material found in the music video for pantychrist. Dentata subsequently announced she was suing Hill for the Montero promotion.

== Discography ==
=== Albums ===
- Pantychrist (2021)
