= Rod Laver (band) =

American Christian rapcore group

- Origin: Los Angeles
- Genres: Rap rock; rap metal; rapcore
- Labels: Screaming Giant, BEC, Uprok
- Past members: Joe Sidoti; Ryan Farris; Rudy Nielson; Joey Marchiano; Jason Martin

Rod Laver (stylized .rod laver) was a Christian rap rock group that originated from Los Angeles. As the personnel lineup changed, the group wavered from a rock-grounded sound to hip hop, and then back again.

Their name has no spiritual meaning, but was derived from an incident in which the bass player was wearing Rod Laver-branded shoes from Adidas.

== Background ==
The band released their debut, The Essence of the Game, in 1999 on Screaming Giant Records. The album was recorded within three weeks of the band's signing, leaving them with the feeling that it had been rushed and under-funded. One reviewer called their sound "hardcore rap", stating that it defied easy classification, and another that the album "singlehandedly made the label live up to its name." Overall, their sound on this album was similar to that Korn. In 2000 they played about 150 shows, touring with Pillar and labelmates Tasty Snax.

Following its release, drummer Joe Sidoti left and was replaced by Joey Marchiano (formerly of Fold Zandura). This change had an effect on the band's sound because Marchiano specialized in a hip-hop, rather than rock, style. With Steve Russell producing, the band stepped down the anger and aggressiveness of their music to focus on the musical elements. This attitude change is also reflected in the title of their sophomore effort, Trying Not to Try. In 2000 frontman Rudy Nielson stated to HM magazine "We thought we had to fit some sort of image... We're not trying to be anything anymore." The band spent six months writing Trying. One reviewer found that the effort was tighter and more musically focused, but at the same time failed "to reach the listener at the deeper emotional and intellectual level" lyrically.

Rod Laver toured extensively, continuing to play an average of 200 dates annually. In support of Trying the group embarked on a national tour with Slick Shoes, Ace Troubleshooter, and Calibretto 13, on which they played both secular and religious venues. Their third release, No Toques El Toro, is Spanish for "don't touch the bull". El Toro continues the musical direction of Trying.

Rudy Nielson, vocalist, had been a youth pastor prior to forming the group, and the band was said to have a "strong commitment to ministry." Nielson told HM that "I don't say 'Jesus' and 'God' in the lyrics a lot... It's not overly preachy, and it's not overly praise and worship oriented." One of the band's goals was to cross over into mainstream markets in a similar fashion to P.O.D. After releasing three albums with Screaming Giant they signed to BEC Records.

In a Perfect World features the guest vocals of Pigeon John. rod laver again changed drummers, adding the rock talents of Jason Martin (not to be confused with Jason Martin of Starflyer 59). The band changed their sound again, seeking to distance themselves from the rapcore genre. As described to HM magazine by Nielson: "There is no rap-rap-scream, rap-rap-scream [on this album]." One review found the sound to have soul, r&b, and funk influences, but occasionally break into an Eminem-like form. HM editor Doug Van Pelt praised the new incarnation of the rhythm section, stating that it brought credibility to the band's sound.

== Discography ==
- 1999: The Essence of the Game (Screaming Giant)
- 2000: Trying Not to Try
- 2001: No Toque El Toro
- 2001: In a Perfect World (BEC Records)
- 2004: Rudolph Wayne vs. The Man (Uprok Records)

== Members ==
- Chris Butler - bass
- Ryan Farris - guitar
- Rudy Nielson - vocals
- Joe Sidoti - drums (-2000)
- Joey Marchiano - drums (2000–2001)
- Jason Martin - drums (2001+)
