= A Good Fight =

American rock band

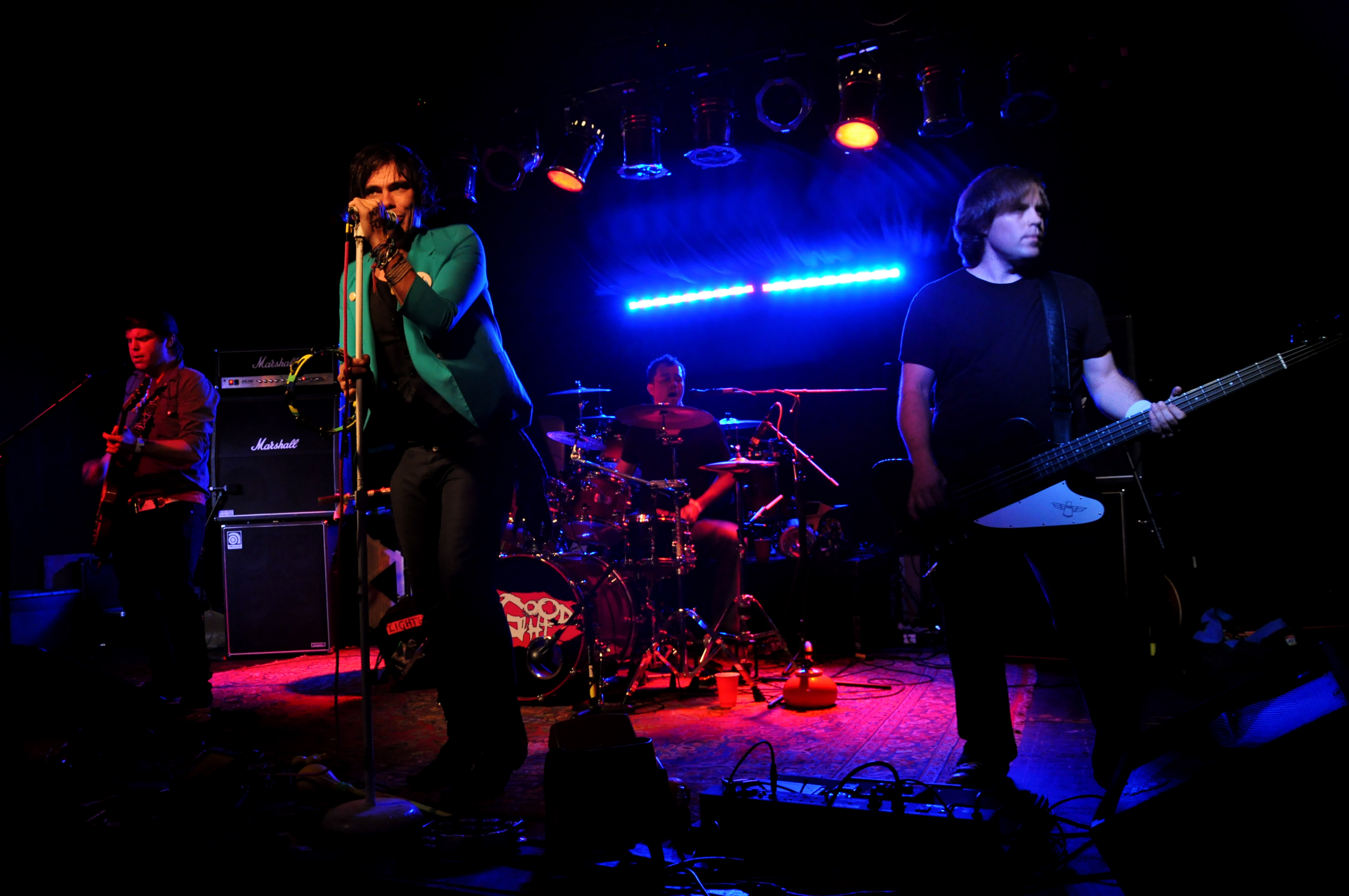

Background information
- Origin: Fayetteville, Arkansas, U.S.
- Genres: Pop rock, power pop, alternative rock
- Years active: 2004–2013
- Members: Jon Woods; Eddie Love; Dustin Woods; Eddie Mekelburg; Christian Sanchez
- Past members: Sean Marriott; Rob Lee
- Website: agoodfight.net

A Good Fight (commonly abbreviated to AGF) was an American rock band group from Fayetteville, Arkansas, which was active from 2004 to 2013. At the time of disbandment, the group consisted of Eddie Love, Jon Woods, Dustin Woods, Eddie Mekelburg, and Christian Sanchez.

The band's first album, The City Could Be Ours By Morning, was released in February 2008. On May 1, 2010, they released their titular second album, A Good Fight. The group went on an indefinite hiatus and informally disbanded during the production of their planned third album in 2013, citing artistic differences.

== History ==
=== 2004–2006: Formation and early years ===
A Good Fight was founded in Fayetteville, Arkansas in 2004 by Jon Woods and his brother, Dustin. They later contacted Sean Marriott, a local drummer from Hot Springs, Arkansas, who was residing in Fayetteville at the time. The band name is a tribute to a close friend who died in a car accident in 1994, drawing reference to a verse in II Timothy 4:7 of the Bible, "I have fought the good fight". After the three met, they agreed to form a band. During this time, Jon successfully ran for state representative. Later in 2006, Eddie Love joined the lineup as a vocalist.

=== 2007–2009: First performance and success of first album ===
With the lineup complete in 2006, the band rehearsed and wrote material throughout 2006 and 2007. On April 21, 2007, they performed their first show at George's Majestic Lounge in Fayetteville, Arkansas to a crowd of 400 fans. Their first album, The City Could be Ours by Morning, was released in February 2008 at a sold-out show at George's Majestic Lounge.

Within months of the album's release, the band won a nationwide MTV contest in which 4,000 bands competed to have their music played during an MTV reality show.^{[5]} A Good Fight received the most votes out of over half a million cast for the music video of their debut single, "The Drama". MTV contacted the group after they had won the competition and hosted a party for them at the Embassy Suites John Q. Hammons Center in Rogers, Arkansas on August 1, 2008. The song was played during the season finale of A Shot at Love with Tila Tequila and several episodes of Made, and their music video for "The Drama" was also played on MTV. The band was invited to play at the SXSW Music Festival in Austin, Texas on March 21, 2009.

=== 2010–2013: Second album release and continued commercial success ===
In 2009, the band began working on their second album, A Good Fight. It was released on May 1, 2010, at another sold-out show at George's Majestic Lounge. Due to extensive touring, drummer Sean Marriott requested to be replaced. In October 2010, Rob Lee replaced Sean as the new drummer and the band continued to tour. In early 2011, guitarist Eddie Mekelburg joined the band.

On May 28, 2011, the band played at Rocklahoma in Pryor, Oklahoma, and again on May 26, 2012, where drummer Rob Lee met his future wife. Several months later Rob requested to be replaced to focus on law school and his new relationship.

In August 2012, Christian Sanchez became the band's new drummer. Jon took a break from touring to focus on his recent election to the Arkansas State Senate and was replaced on the road by Jake Norton in August 2012. Jon continued to produce new recordings for a third album and managed the band. In 2013, the band consisted of Eddie Love, Rizz, Eddie Mekelburg, Jake Norton, and Christian Sanchez.

The band toured extensively and appeared on Sony PlayStation's MLB 13: The Show. The group played a sold-out reunion show on November 8, 2013, at George's Majestic Lounge in Fayetteville, Arkansas with former drummers Sean Marriott and Rob Lee, and bassist Jon Woods.

=== Current status ===
During the November 8, 2013 show, the band announced they would be taking a break from touring to focus on their next planned album, The Kids Keep Asking For More. However, the group disbanded during production due to internal conflicts. Founding member Jon Woods, a former Arkansas state senator, is currently serving an eighteen-year prison sentence for fraud.

== Discography ==
=== Albums ===
- 2008: The City Could be Ours by Morning
- 2010: A Good Fight

== Band members ==
- Eddie Love – lead vocals (2006–2013)
- Rizz – lead guitar, backing vocals (2004–2013)
- Eddie Mekelburg – rhythm guitar, backing vocals (2011–2013)
- Christian Sanchez – drums, percussion, backing vocals (2013)
- Jon Woods - bass guitar, backing vocals (2004–present); Record Producer (2004–2013)
- Jake Norton – bass guitar (2013)
- Sean Marriott – drums, percussion, backing vocals (2004–2010)
- Rob Lee – drums, percussion, backing vocals (2010–2012)

== Awards and contests ==
=== Contests ===
- Winner – "I Want My Music on MTV"
- Winner – ROCKNATION magazine GRAND PRIZE
- Winner – AMP "Unsigned Band Contest - Part Duex"

=== Awards ===
- NAMA (Northwest Arkansas Music Awards) - 2007 Best New Band
- Celebrate Magazine - 2007 Best Band of the Year
- NAMA (Northwest Arkansas Music Awards) - 2012 Best Band of the Year
