= Aranda (band) =

American rock band

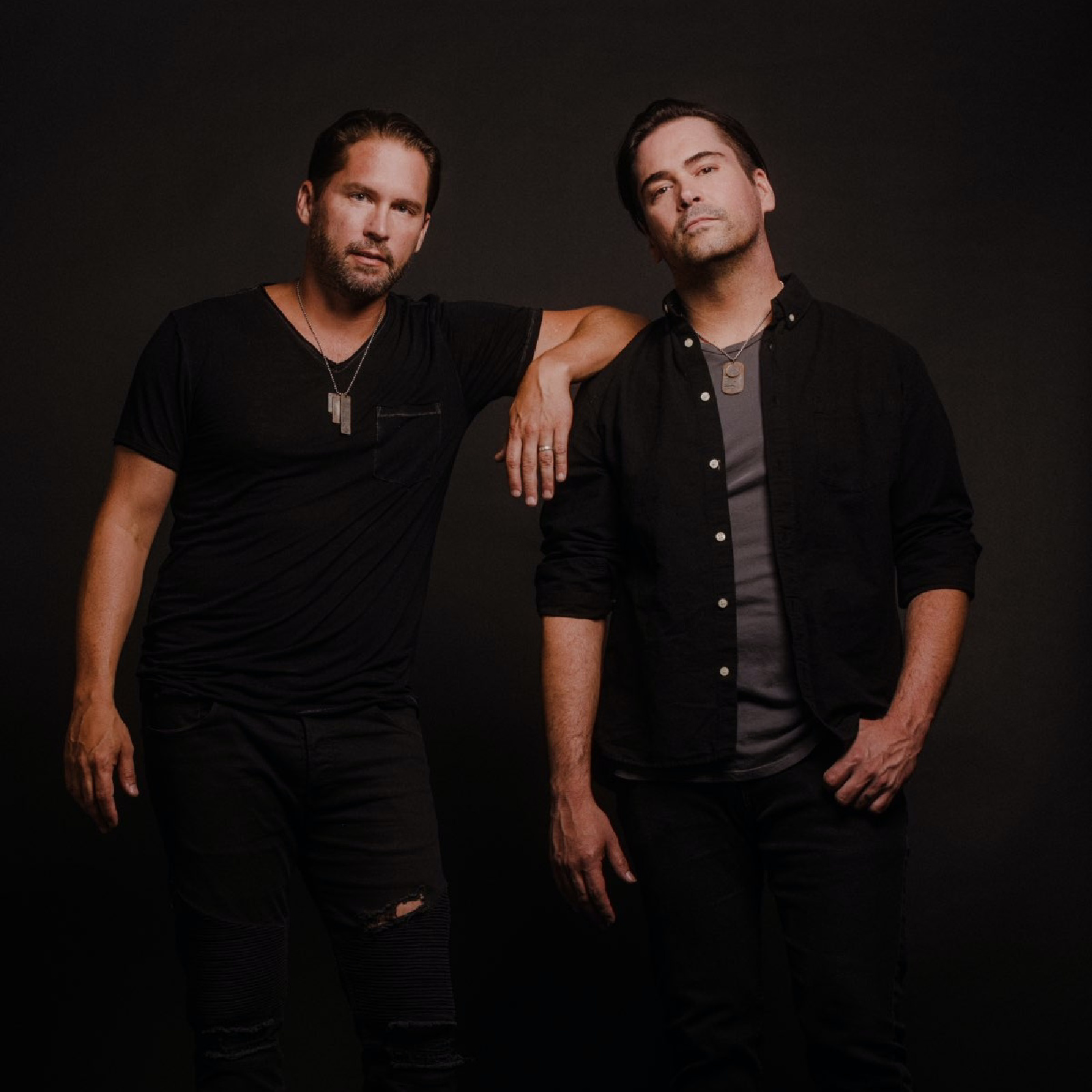
- Aranda in 2021

Background information
- Origin: Oklahoma City, Oklahoma, U.S.
- Genres: Hard rock, post-grunge
- Years active: 2001–present
- Labels: Wind-up, Astonish, Epic
- Members: Dameon Aranda; Gabe Aranda; Chavez Soliz; Jeff Hall
- Past members: Chad Roper; Chris Rhoads; Brine Webb; Armando Lopez; Mike Walker (deceased)
- Website: arandamusic.com

Aranda is an American rock band from Oklahoma City, Oklahoma. The band is composed of Dameon and Gabe Aranda. Their latest album Are You Not Entertained? was released on October 2, 2026 through Astonish Entertainment.

== History ==
=== Self-titled debut album (2001–2010) ===
Dameon and Gabe Aranda have been creating music since an early age. The band became Aranda in 2001 and signed to Epic Records after years of playing locally in Oklahoma City with various groups under various names such as "Image" and "Freewill" in the 1990s. After recording an album for Epic, they were let go from the label following a massive structural overhaul. Original drummer Armando Lopez left the band in 2003 to join No Justice. Mike Walker joined the band to record "The 405 Sessions" in 2004 and became a permanent member when the band signed to Astonish Records in 2006. The band's first full-length record, Aranda, was released on April 22, 2008. The first single, "Still in the Dark", peaked at No. 31 on the Hot Mainstream Rock Tracks chart. Aranda has toured with bands like The All-American Rejects, Buckcherry, Sevendust, Anew Revolution, Since October, Edisun, Saliva, Shinedown, Puddle of Mudd, Theory of a Deadman, Black Stone Cherry, Shaman's Harvest, and Tantric. They also were on tour with Halestorm, Adelitas Way, 3 Doors Down, and Daughtry. In 2010 Aranda performed at Rocklahoma in Pryor, Oklahoma. They were nominated in 2012 for a RadioContraband Rock Radio Award for Indie Artist of the Year. In 2015 it was announced that Aranda would perform at the 10th Rock on the Range festival in Columbus, Ohio in May 2016.

=== Stop the World (2010–2014) ===
Aranda announced via Facebook their new album would be called "Stop the World", and on July 1, 2011, they released the lead single, "Undone". On January 31, 2012, Stop the World was released on iTunes. The album was produced by Grammy-nominated producer Johnny K, and has 10 songs. Aranda became signed to Wind-up Records in mid-2012.

=== Not the Same (2015–2022) ===
On June 30, 2015, Aranda released their third studio album Not the Same featuring the tracks "Don’t Wake Me" and "We Are the Enemy". Produced by Kato Khandwala, the release peaked at number 12 on the Billboard Heatseeker Albums Chart.

=== Recollections of a Painted Year (2022–present) ===
On July 29, 2022, Aranda released their fourth studio album Recollections of a Painted Year with a total of nine tracks. A deluxe edition was later released adding another five tracks bringing the total to fourteen.

== In popular culture ==
- "Whyyawannabringmedown" was used as official theme for WWE's PPV The Bash, and later, recorded by Grammy Award winner Kelly Clarkson.
- "All I Ever Wanted" was also recorded by Kelly Clarkson for her fourth record, which was named after the song, and is the fourth single from the album.

== Discography ==
=== Studio albums ===
- Aranda (2008)
- Stop the World (2012)
- Not the Same (2015) #12 Billboard Heatseeker Albums
- Recollections of a Painted Year (2022)
- Are You Not Entertained? (2026)

=== Singles ===
Title	Year	Peak chart positions			Album
Title	Year	US Main.	US Rock	Rock Airplay	Album
"Still in the Dark"	2008	31	—	—	Aranda
"Whyyawannabringmedown"	2009	26	—	—	Aranda
"Undone"	2011	24	41	41	Stop the World
"Satisfied"	2012	16	34	34	Stop the World
"One More Lie"	2012	15	—	41	Stop the World
"Don't Wake Me"	2015	17	—	—	Not the Same
"We Are the Enemy"	2015	18	—	—	Not the Same
"Stay"	2016	—	—	48	Not the Same
"Invisible"	2020	—	—	—	Recollections of a Painted Year
"Blue Sky"	2021	—	—	—	Recollections of a Painted Year
"I Can't"	2021	—	—	—	Recollections of a Painted Year
"Compartmentalize"	2021	—	—	—	Recollections of a Painted Year
"The Light and Dark"	2022	—	—	—	Recollections of a Painted Year
"Punch Out" (with A.D.A.M. Music Project)	2025	33	—	—	Punch Out
"You Don't Wanna Know"	2025	26	—	—	Are You Not Entertained?
"This Is Not the End"	2026	—	—	—	Are You Not Entertained?
"Legz"	2026	—	—	—	Are You Not Entertained?

=== Music videos ===
Title	Year	Director
"Whyyawannabringmedown"	2009	Chezney
"Don't Wake Me"	2015	Clark Deal
"The Light and Dark"	2023	Reagan Elkins
"You Don't Wanna Know"	2025	Reagan Elkins
"This Is Not the End"	2026	Reagan Elkins
"Legz"	2026	Reagan Elkins
