= Keahiwai =

Hawaiian music duo

- Origin: Mililani, Hawaii, U.S.
- Genre: Hawaiian
- Years active: 1997–2009
- Label: 808e Productions
- Members: Mailani Makainai; Lei Melket

Keahiwai was a Hawaiian music duo composed of musicians Mailani Makainai and Lei Melket from Mililani, Hawaii.

== History ==
Mailani and Lei met at Maryknoll School, Honolulu, Hawaii in 1991 and became friends. Each was unaware that the other had musical interests until 1997; Lei played the ukulele and Mailani was a singer. That year, the duo entered a school talent show and won. They began performing at family events and parties. In 1999, they landed their first professional gig at a local coffee shop.

Keahiwai released their debut album, Local Girls with producers Aaron Kimura and Jon Yamasato in May 2001. The album was nominated for five Na Hoku Hanohano Awards by the Hawai'i Academy of Recording Arts. The album won two awards: Most Promising Artist of the Year, and Favorite Entertainer of the Year.

Keahiwai released their second album, Satisfied, in 2002. Following the release of Satisfied, they toured the pacific islands of Guam and Saipan.

Keahiwai's third album, Dangerous, was released in October 2005. Dangerous was the duo's most successful album. It spent two weeks on the Billboard World Music Chart in November 2005, peaking at No. 10.

In November 2006, Keahiwai released two albums; Merry Christmas, a holiday music album, and Changing.

Mailani and Lei ceased performing as Keahiwai in 2009 and each began solo careers.

== Discography ==
=== Albums ===
Year	Album
2001	Local Girls
2002	Satisfied
2005	Dangerous
2006	Merry Christmas
2006	Changing
