= Oxymorrons =

American rap rock group

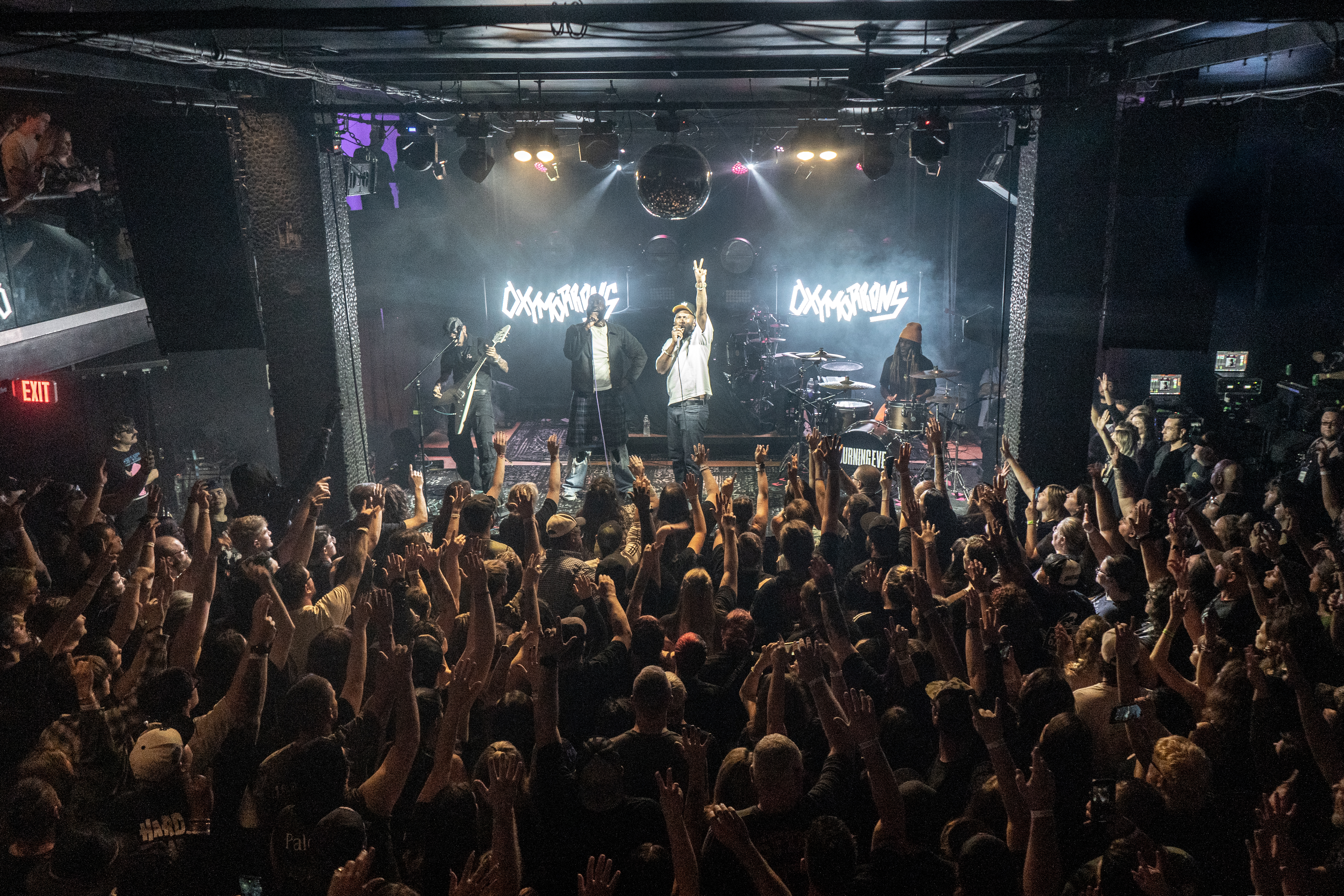
Oxymorrons at The Regency Live - 9-21-25

Oxymorrons are an American rap rock band from Queens, New York, consisting of vocalist Demi "Deee" and brother Kami "KI" drummer Matty Mayz and vocalist/guitarist/bassist Jafe Paulino.

== Career ==
Oxymorrons began as a collaboration between Queens-bred brothers, Kami (K.I.) and Demi (Deee), who collaborated to create a hip hop and rock fusion act. After years spent playing and touring with other groups, the brothers decided it was time to contribute to the New York scene. The lineup expanded with the addition of staple drummer Matty Mayz, alongside Vocalist/bassist/guitarist Jafe Paulino has become an essential part of the bands live show. They use their musical platform to speak for, and to, the rejected, with the message of most of their music being embracing one's individuality..

They have played in many festivals including SXSW, Firefly, and AfroPunk, while they have made partnerships with artists including Ludacris, Juicy J, Bruno Mars, and Rihanna.

The band released "Brunch" as the first single from their next project on February 2, 2018. VIBE dubbed them "The Mash Out Posse" for their clash of hip-hop, rock, funk and alternative sounds.

== Band members ==
- Dave "D" Bellevue – vocals
- Ashmy "KI" Bellevue – vocals
- Matty Mayz – drums
- Jafe Paulino – vocals, bass guitar, guitar

== Discography ==
=== Albums ===
- Complex But Basic (October 2016)
- Mohawks and Durags (June 2021)
- Melanin Punk (October 20, 2023)

=== Singles ===
List of singles, with selected chart positions, showing year released and album name
Title	Year	Peak Chart Positions	Album
Title	Year	US Main. Rock	Album
"Look Alive (Netic)"	2023	28	Melanin Punk

=== Music videos ===
List of music videos, showing year released and directors
Title	Year	Director(s)
"808 Clap"	2014	Wearenotnatives
"Hello Me"	2016	Eric Schneider
"Asleep"	2016	A1 Productions
"Brunch"	2018	Brian Nunez
"See Stars"	2018	A1 Vision
"Green Vision"	2021	A1 Vision
"Definition"	2021	Michael Danners
"Enemy"	2023	Unknown
"Last Call"	2023	Unknown
"Look Alive (Netic)"	2023	Mike of I Am Eye Photos
"Blk Sheep"	2025	Mike of I Am Eye Photos
"Bombs Over Gaza"	2026	VRTU Presents and Urban Souls Production
