= ASKA (band) =

American heavy metal band

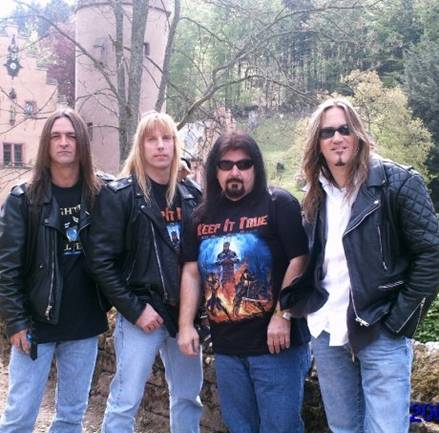

Background information
- Origin: Dallas, Texas
- Genres: Heavy metal, power metal, Traditional metal
- Years active: 1990–present
- Label: Vanadium
- Members: George Call; Keith Knight; Eric Halpern; Danny White
- Past members: Darren Knapp; Damon Call; Jason Sweatt; Jim Arnett; David Ogle; Derek Wright; Lamberto Alvarez; Chris Menta; Dave Harvey; Daryl Norton
- Website: http://www.askahq.com

ASKA, is an American heavy metal band formed in 1990 in Dallas–Fort Worth, Texas. The 1990 iteration of the band included Darren Knapp, Damon Call, George Call, and Lamberto Alvarez. In 1992, ASKA began touring for the United States Department of Defense until 2000.

ASKA has played at American metal rock festivals such as Rocklahoma, as well as overseas festivals such as Germany's 12th annual Keep It True festival. As of 2011, the band has toured 37 countries.

ASKA has released six studio albums.

== Discography ==
- Aska (1991)
- Immortal (1994)
- Nine Tongues (1997)
- Avenger (2000)
- Absolute Power (2007)
- Fire Eater (2013)
- Knight Strike (2024)

== Line-up ==
=== Current members ===
- George Call – vocals and guitar
- Keith Knight – bass and vocals
- Danny White – drums
- Eric Halpern – guitar

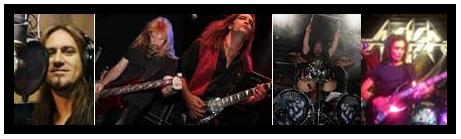
From left to right: George Call, Keith Knight, Daryl Norton, Danny White, and Chris Menta

=== Former members ===
- Darren Knapp
- Damon Call
- Jason Sweatt
- Daryl Norton
- Chris Menta
- Bryant Contreras
