= Satisfied (Aranda song) =

Single by Aranda

from the album Stop the World
- Released: 28 March 2012
- Genre: Hard rock
- Length: 3:23
- Songwriter(s): Dameon Aranda, Gabe Aranda, Johnny K
- Producer(s): Johnny K

Aranda singles chronology
"Undone" (2011)	"Satisfied" (2012)	"One More Lie" (2012)

"Satisfied" is a single from Stop the World, the second studio album from American rock band Aranda. Produced by Johnny K, the song was released on March 28, 2012 and reached #16 on the Mainstream Rock chart in October 2012.

== Background ==
The song was marketed by students at Academy of Contemporary Music at the University of Central Oklahoma. Starting in February 2012, Trey Rick, the coordinator of academic operations for the Academy of Contemporary Music located at the University of Central Oklahoma, decided to take an alternative path from what is usually undertaken in his "Music Marketing and Retail 2" course. In place of the standard path, Rick allowed a dozen of his students to market Aranda, who earlier approached Rick about how to best promote their upcoming record.

The students studied the band's music, studied the internet to determine where the group may have a following, and spoke with others to measure how people received the band. After marketing proposals were concocted, the best six were shown to the band. Because the band released Stop the World six months before, things happened out of sequence, which made the project a non-textbook case.

The students worked on social media, created the internet site for the band, managed street teams and programmed a lyric video for the song, much of which was uncharted territory for the ensemble. Because the group had a difficult time perceiving how they appeared to the populace, the project was invaluable to the quartet.

With respect to the project, Rick stated that "The original thing they came for morphed from promoting the record to positioning the band, the idea was to make the band self-sufficient [online], make sure [fans] didn't have to work hard to find them and have a consistent presence."

Once the student project was put in place, the song started rising on music charts. In May 2012, the song sold more than 1000 copies weekly, reaching 35 000 downloads by November of that year, reaching No. 14 at Active Rock the month prior. As a result, New York City record company Wind-up Records signed the band in mid-2012, re-releasing Stop the World later than year.

Wind-up Records general manager Alan Galbraith commented on the band and the student project stating:

"We're constantly trying to find anybody making inroads, and they did that at radio and online, only after the fact did we learn about the school, but it's such a cool story it piqued our interest further. They did it in a unique way. It's a real example of a band putting themselves on our radar rather than waiting for us to find them."

== Critical reception ==
Gene Triplett of The Oklahoman states "One begins to get the notion that someone knows the pain of betrayal and heartbreak from the angry power-balladry of “Satisfied”".
Regarding the band's performance of the song at The Abbey on November 10, 2012, Always Acoustic commented: "Maybe the lead vocalist should be Dameon Aranda because he definitely can hold a tune and killed it on "Satisfied" as he played the acoustic guitar. The song is definitely one of the best songs from Stop the World."

== Charts ==
Chart (2012)	Peak position
US Mainstream Rock Songs (Billboard)	16
