= Shuvel =

American metal band

- Origin: Wichita, Kansas, U.S.
- Genres: Nu metal; rap metal
- Years active: 1997–2011
- Label: Interscope
- Past members: Isaac Ayala; Jeff Hollinger; Kyle Hollinger; Ryan Stuber; Carlos Sandoval; Josh Fresia; Trevor Stafford; Keigan Veer; Logan Dudley

Shuvel was an American nu metal/rap metal band originally from Wichita, Kansas. The band released their major label debut album in 2000 through Interscope Records.

== History ==
Original members Jeff Hollinger (vocals), Isaac Ayala (vocals) and Kyle Hollinger (drums) formed the band in 1997 in Wichita, Kansas. They added guitarist Ryan Stuber and bassist Carlos Sandoval. After playing local venues for a while, they moved to Phoenix, Arizona to further their career, spending six months there until then moving to Los Angeles.

A stripper in attendance at the band's performance at a house party in San Pedro, California connected the band with an artist relations agent from Interscope Records in 1999. The band released their debut album Set It Off on August 29, 2000. The band toured with Sevendust, Crazy Town, and Kittie, and landed a spot on the second stage of Ozzfest 2000.

The band was eventually left with only one vocalist, Isaac Ayala, due to the band kicking out Jeff Hollinger from the band after 2006. Shuvel continued to tour and release music until their dissolution in 2011.

Shuvel drummer Kyle Hollinger later joined the band Crazy Town. Another Shuvel drummer Trevor Stafford went on to join Adelitas Way.

== Musical style and reception ==
According to Spin reviewer Greg Milner, the band's sound is a "mash-up of Beasties, Bizkit and Helmet." Milner called the band's music "genuine head-bobbing/banging music" and "fine mainstream metal". James Doolittle of The Morning Call was unimpressed with the "metal/rap routine" of Set It Off, going on to say that "you realize just how silly a copycat sounds when nothing new is brought to the table." Tim Sheridan of AllMusic called the album "an energetic but rather run-of-the-mill rap-metal disc".

== Members ==
Final lineup

- Isaac Ayala – vocals (1997–2011)
- Ryan Stuber – guitar (1997–2011)
- Carlos Sandoval – bass (1997–2011)
- Josh Fresia – drums (2005–2011)

Previous members

- Jeff Hollinger – vocals (1997–2006)
- Kyle Hollinger – drums (1998–2000)
- Trevor Stafford – drums (2001)
- Keigan Veer – guitar (1997)
- Logan Dudley – drums (1997)

== Discography ==
Albums

- Set It Off (2000)
- Return of the Fist (2006)
- As the World Burns (2009)

EPs

- The Demonstration (1999)
- Demo (2003)

Singles

| Year | Song | Album |
|---|---|---|
| 1999 | "Clean Slate" | Celebrity Deathmatch Soundtrack |
| 1999 | "Hit List" | Set It Off |
| 2000 | "Set It Off" | Set It Off |
| 2006 | "Hollow | Return of the Fist |
