= Rocklahoma =

Rock music festival in Pryor, Oklahoma, U.S.

Coordinates: 36.364°N 95.278°W

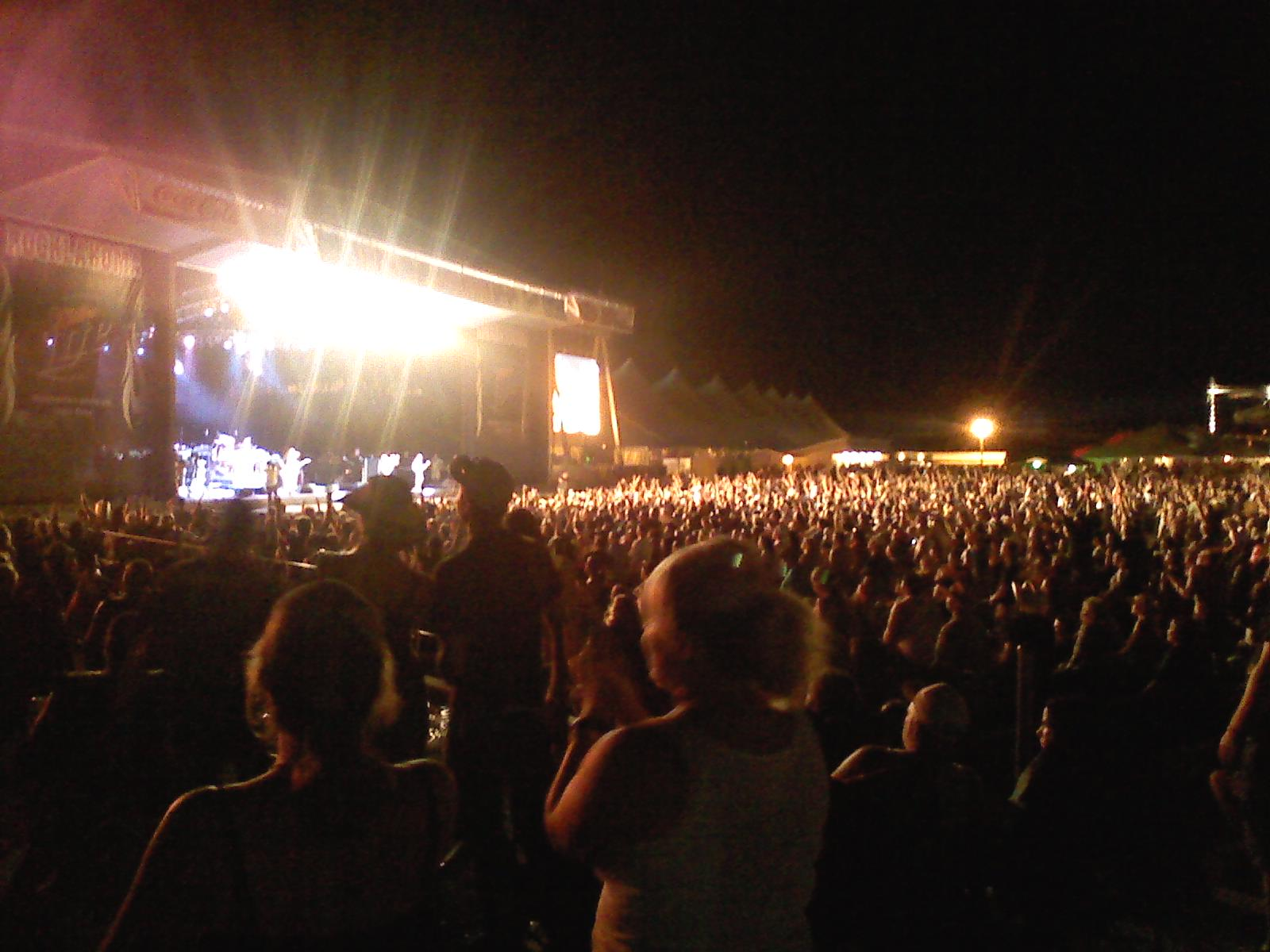
- Sebastian Bach performing at Rocklahoma 2008
- Genre: Hard rock; heavy metal
- Dates: May; July
- Locations: Pryor, Oklahoma, U.S.
- Years active: 2007–2019; 2021–present
- Founders: Mark Nuessle
- Website: rocklahoma.com

Rocklahoma is an annual 3-day hard rock and metal festival held in Pryor, Oklahoma. The festival features 3 official stages, as well as many unofficial campground parties and performing acts and onsite vendors. There were an estimated 100,000 people (about 30,000 per day) at the first annual Rocklahoma held in 2007. The Third Annual Rocklahoma had over seventy bands on four stages, including favorites from previous Rocklahoma festivals, Beautiful Creatures, LA Guns featuring Tracii Guns, Bang Tango, Lillian Axe, Gypsy Pistoleros and Faster Pussycat. Included on the side stages are bands from all over Europe. Coffee table books for Rocklahoma 2007, 2008, 2009 and 2010 have been published and are available on the web.

Rocklahoma saw 2020 get deferred to 2021, when it resumed.

== Lineups ==
=== 2007 ===
Faster Pussycat playing at Rocklahoma 2007

There were approximately eight bands playing per day for four days at Rocklahoma 2007. These bands were as follows:

Thursday, July 12

- The Jersey Syndicate (JPOTMUSIC.COM side stage performers)
- Uro Steppe
- Gypsy Pistoleros
- Hollywood Roses
- Lillian Axe (replaced Tigertailz)
- KISS Army
- US 66
- Off Beat Road

Friday, July 13

- The Jersey Syndicate (JPOTMUSIC.COM side stage performers)
- Zendozer
- Greg Leon Invasion
- Dirty Penny (JPOTMUSIC.COM contest winners)
- Mike Tramp's White Lion
- Y&T
- Slaughter
- Quiet Riot
- Ratt
- Poison

Saturday, July 14

- The Jersey Syndicate (JPOTMUSIC.COM side stage performers)
- 36 Inches
- Down for Five (JPOTMUSIC.COM contest winners)
- Bang Tango
- Bulletboys
- Faster Pussycat
- Enuff Z'Nuff
- FireHouse
- Warrant
- Skid Row
- Winger
- Dokken
- Vince Neil

Sunday, July 15

- The Jersey Syndicate (JPOTMUSIC.COM side stage performers)
- TripSpontain (Budweiser side stage)
- Soulrider
- Pedal Point
- Rhino Bucket (JPOTMUSIC.COM contest winners)
- Britny Fox
- Steelheart
- L.A. Guns
- Great White
- Jackyl
- Queensrÿche (replaced W.A.S.P.)
- Twisted Sister

=== 2008 ===
Thursday, July 10

- Bret Michaels
- L.A. Guns
- Enuff Z'Nuff
- Vain
- Jetboy
- House of Lords
- Cockpit
- Joetown

Friday, July 11

- Armored Saint
- XYZ
- Kingdom Come
- Night Ranger
- Triumph
- Extreme

Friday, July 12

- Warrant
- Kix
- Cinderella (canceled)
- Every Mother's Nightmare
- Black 'n Blue
- Pretty Boy Floyd
- Tora Tora
- Trixter

Saturday, July 13

- Axe
- Beautiful Creatures
- Zebra
- Lynch Mob
- Tesla

=== 2009 ===
Thursday, July 9

- Anthrax
- Saxon
- Overkill
- Anvil
- Metal Church
- Leatherwolf

A screening of Anvil! The Story of Anvil was shown after Anthrax.

Friday, July 10

- RATT
- Night Ranger
- Warrant
- Danger Danger
- Helix
- Hericane Alice

Saturday, July 11

- Stryper
- Jackyl
- Kix
- Keel
- Lizzy Borden
- Gypsy Pistoleros

Sunday, July 12

- Twisted Sister
- Skid Row
- Great White
- Nelson
- Bonfire
- Vixen

=== 2010 ===
Friday, May 28

- Godsmack
- Buckcherry
- Saving Abel
- Adelitas Way
- Richy Nix
- The Veer Union
- Brookroyal
- New Medicine
- Bad Things
- Krank
- Firstryke
- O'Dette
- Mad Max
- New Cool World
- Black Tora

Saturday, May 29

- ZZ Top
- Cinderella
- Saliva
- Fuel
- Janus
- Shaman's Harvest
- Burn Halo
- Like A Storm
- Taking Dawn
- Gypsy Pistoleros
- The Last Vegas
- Problem Child
- The Glitter Boys
- Wildstreet
- O'Dette
- Krank
- Bad Things

Sunday, May 30

- Tesla
- Chevelle
- Theory of a Deadman
- Sevendust
- Aranda
- Lacuna Coil
- Taddy Porter
- Nigel Dupree Band
- Year Long Disaster
- Within Reason
- Bad Things
- Wildstreet
- Problem Child
- The Glitter Boys
- Firstryke
- Mad Max
- New Cool World

=== 2011 ===
Friday, May 27

- Whitesnake
- Hinder
- Skillet
- Sick Puppies
- All That Remains
- My Darkest Days
- Jonathan Tyler and the Northern Lights
- Texas Hippie Coalition
- New Medicine
- Bad Things
- Wildstreet
- Loveblast
- D'Molls
- Alias
- Blue Tiger
- Firestryke
- Chuck Cooley and the Demon Hammers
- Signum A.D.
- Silverstone
- Return to Custody

Saturday, May 28

- Staind
- Sebastian Bach
- Drowning Pool
- Rev Theory
- Cavo
- Pop Evil
- The Gracious Few
- Hail the Villain
- Taddy Porter
- Electric Touch
- Gypsy Pistoleros
- Cutlass
- Mock Star
- Aura Surreal
- Aska
- Strikeforce
- Siva Addiction
- A Good Fight
- Bait
- Rocker Lips
- Sweatin Bullets

Sunday, May 29

- Mötley Crüe
- Poison
- Papa Roach
- Seether
- Black Label Society
- Saving Abel
- Escape the Fate
- Crooked X
- Art of Dying
- One Less Reason
- Bad Things
- The Glitter Boys
- Black Tora
- New Cool World
- Pretty Little Suicide
- Diemonds
- Brandon Clark Band
- David Castro Band
- Desi and Cody

=== 2012 ===
Friday, May 25

- Creed
- Slash
- Chevelle
- P.O.D.
- Cavo
- Adelitas Way
- Red
- Redlight King
- Janus
- Eve to Adam
- Beneath
- Fist of Rage
- Lynam
- Pretty Little Suicide
- Hessler
- Down & Dirty
- Ragdoll
- Sunset Riot
- Absence of Ink
- For the Broken
- Echo Fuzz
- Shotgun Rebels
- Soulicit
- Rocker Lips
- Mine Enemies Fall

Saturday, May 26

- Rob Zombie
- Megadeth
- Theory of a Deadman
- Volbeat
- The Darkness
- 10 Years
- Pop Evil
- Trivium
- New Medicine
- Anti-Mortem
- Gypsy Pistoleros
- Lillian Axe
- Firstryke
- S.E.X. Department
- Ruff Justice
- Switchblade Scarlett
- On Fire
- Villains Dance
- Stun
- Dagger
- Unwritten Rulz
- Echo Vendetta
- A Good Fight
- Sweatin Bullets

Sunday, May 27

- Black Stone Cherry
- Charm City Devils
- Chickenfoot
- Hellyeah
- Jackyl
- Puddle of Mudd
- Queensrÿche
- Eddie Trunk
- Art of Dying
- Aranda
- Rains
- Falling in Reverse
- Wildstreet
- Black Tora
- The Glitter Boys
- Diemonds
- Desi and Cody
- David Castro Band
- The Hawkeyes
- We the Ghost
- Through the Thorns
