= Rap rock =

Music genre combining hip hop and rock

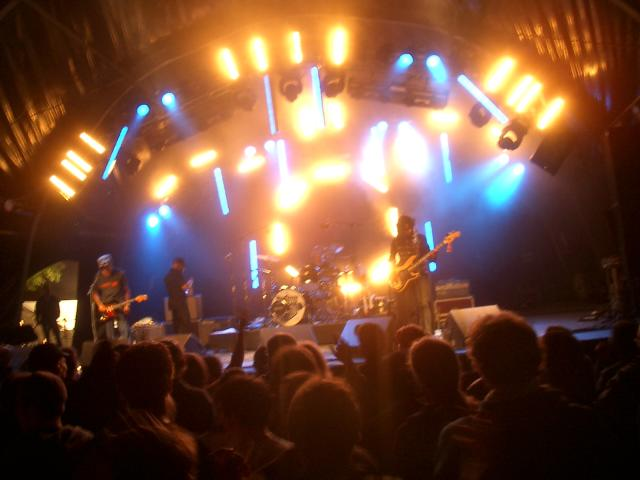
- Urban Dance Squad performing in 2006
- Stylistic origins: Hip hop; rock
- Cultural origins: Early to mid-1980s, United States

Other topics
- Alternative hip-hop; country rap; Crunk; Crunkcore; Punk rap; Rapcore; Rap metal; Emo rap

Rap rock is a fusion genre that developed from the early to mid-1980s, when hip hop DJs incorporated rock records into their routines and rappers began incorporating original and sampled rock instrumentation into hip hop music. Rap rock is considered to be rock music in which lyrics are rapped, rather than sung. The genre achieved its greatest success in the late 1990s and early 2000s.

== Characteristics ==
AllMusic characterized rap rock songs as rock songs in which the vocals were rapped rather than sung. AllMusic also states that the rhythms of rap rock are rooted in those of hip hop, with more funk influences than normal hard rock. Session player Eddie Martinez, who created the guitar parts for hip hop group Run-DMC's rap rock song "Rock Box", recognized that "a rap-rock song needn't feature a new change in the chorus; rather, it's a spot where the guitarist can just solo over the same riff that drives the verses."

Rap rock is often conflated with rap metal. While the two styles may appear to have minute differences, AllMusic says that rap rock has "organic, integrated" hip hop elements, while rap metal features "big, lurching beats and heavy, heavy riffs"; the latter also has a tendency to sound "as if the riffs were merely overdubbed over scratching and beat box beats." AllMusic says that old school rap rock had more in common with "hardcore punk or artsy post-punk with breakbeats" than with metal.

== History ==
=== Old school rap rock (1980s to mid-1990s) ===
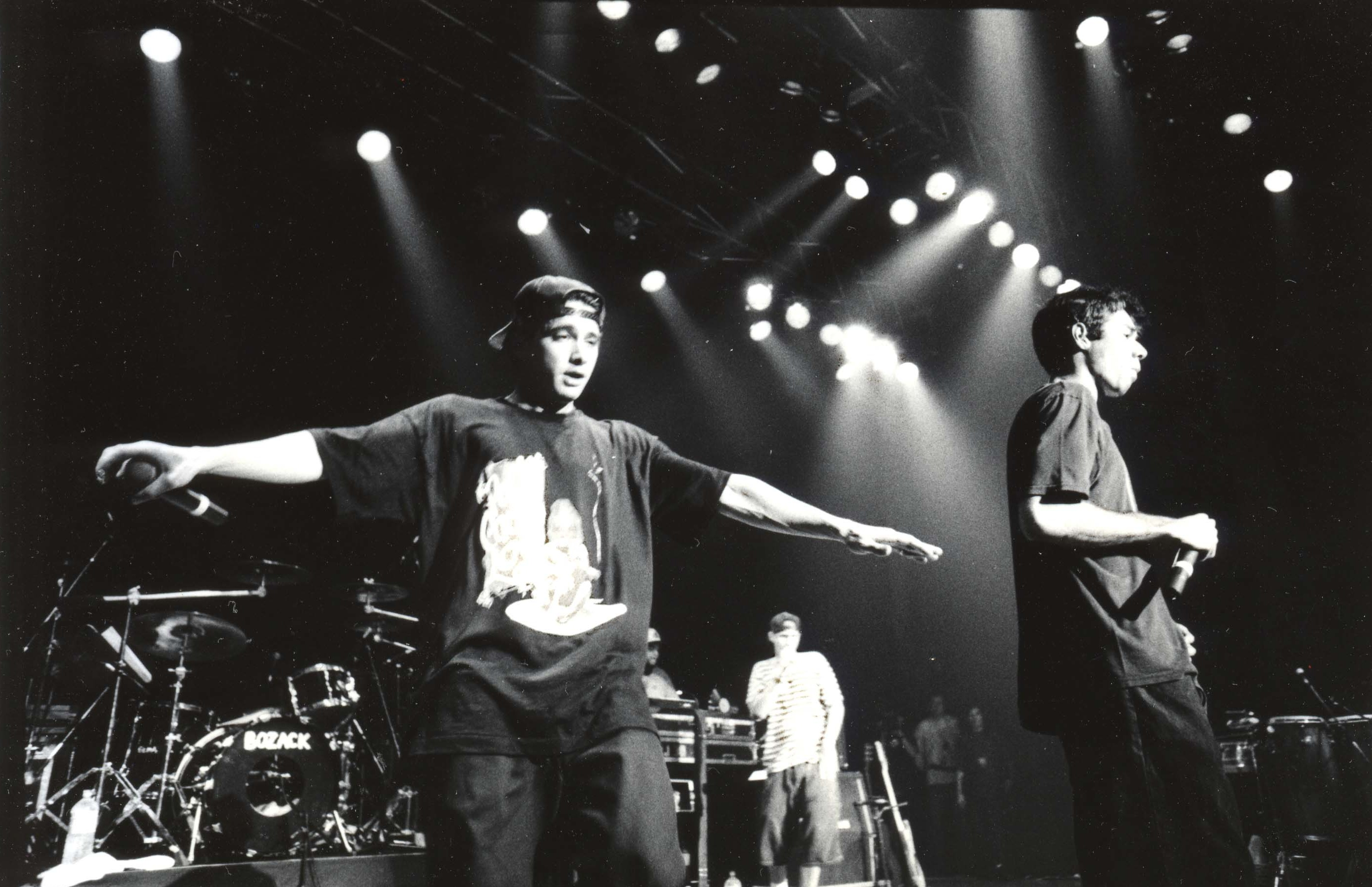
CNN said that Beastie Boys' album Licensed to Ill "essentially invented rap-rock".

Early hip hop DJs utilized breaks from rock records, such as Billy Squier's "the Big Beat", the Monkees' "Mary, Mary" and Steve Miller Band's "Take the Money and Run", in order to "flaunt their vinyl guile". Impressed by post-punk band Public Image Ltd.'s incorporation of dub elements into their music, hip hop artist Afrika Bambaataa collaborated with the band's singer John Lydon on the single "World Destruction". The post-punk and new wave scenes also saw the early rap rock recordings "The Magnificent Seven" and "This Is Radio Clash" by the Clash, influenced by Grandmaster Flash and the Sugarhill Gang, and the new-wave rap song "Rapture" by Blondie. Although the Cold Crush Brothers' "Punk Rock Rap" did not see much success and Grandmaster Flash and the Furious Five would wind up being jeered opening for the Clash, Run-DMC saw a crossover audience with their rap rock sound, helping gain rock fans' acceptance of hip hop. Subsequently, Public Enemy would further unite hip hop and punk rock audiences, "with their rough, hard-hitting boom-bap sound resonating with both black kids in the inner cities and white kids in the suburbs". Public Enemy brought a punk rock attitude to hip hop; frontman Chuck D cited punk band the Clash's triple album Sandinista! as a release that made him take notice of hip hop. Another link between hip hop and punk rock was producer Rick Rubin, who split his time between working with hip hop artists Run-DMC and Beastie Boys, and punk-influenced bands like Slayer and the Cult.

Although hip hop music would gain popularity in the 1980s, many dismissed it as either being a fad, or as a marginal art form which appealed only to urban African Americans. However, a rap rock collaboration between Run-DMC and the rock band Aerosmith helped diminish such biases. The 1986 single "Walk This Way", a remake of Aerosmith's 1975 rock song, helped bring hip hop into popularity with a mainstream white audience. It was the first Billboard top ten rap rock success played on radio. The music video signaled "both a literal and metaphoric merging of hard rock and rap"; the recording revitalized Aerosmith's career. The same year that Run-DMC released "Walk This Way", Beastie Boys released their debut album, Licensed to Ill, "a head-banging party album that enjoyed multi-platinum sales". According to CNN, the album "essentially invented rap-rock", as demonstrated by songs like "Rhymin' and Stealin'", which was built around samples from Black Sabbath, Led Zeppelin and the Clash, "(You Gotta) Fight for Your Right (To Party!)" and "No Sleep till Brooklyn", which featured guitar playing by Slayer's Kerry King. Also that year, rap rock band Urban Dance Squad formed, and according to AllMusic writer Heather Phares, the band's "mix of rock, rap, funk, ska, folk, hip-hop, and soul signaled the trend toward genre-bending that prevailed in '90s music." Public Enemy's 1988 album It Takes a Nation of Millions to Hold Us Back contained a song which sampled Slayer, and in 1991, the hip hop group would re-record their song "Bring the Noise" with the metal band Anthrax, a collaboration Spin deemed to be a weak retread of the "Walk This Way" collaboration.

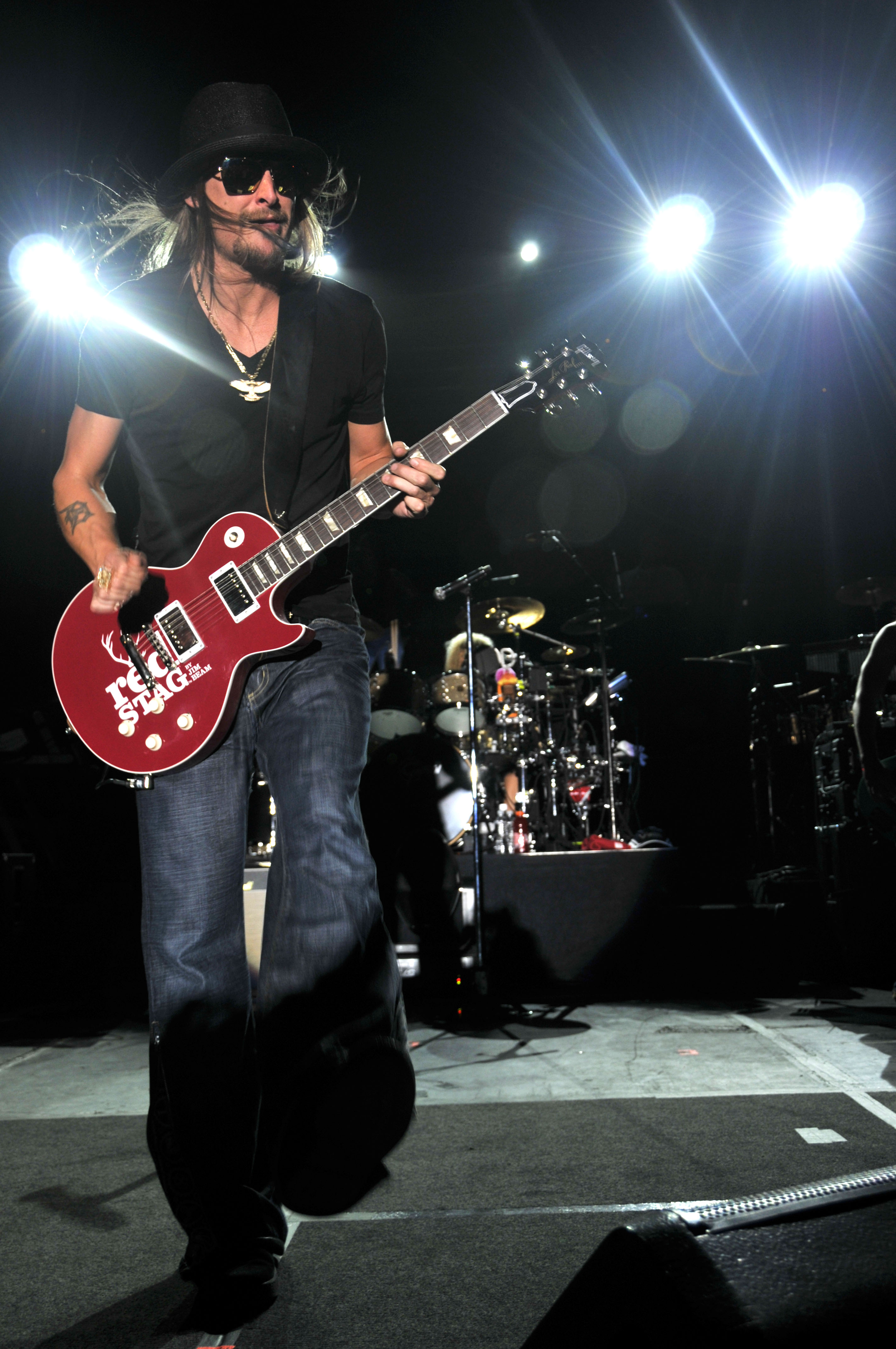
The music of Kid Rock was cited as a bridge between hip hop and rap rock.

The 1990s saw rap rock achieving mainstream success. Faith No More reached a large audience with their 1990 hit "Epic", in which the band's singer, Mike Patton, mixed singing and rapping. Rage Against the Machine also saw success with rap rock music influenced by political hip-hop. According to the BBC, 1990s hip hop artists like Ice Cube, DMX and Onyx displayed the punk rock sensibilities of hip hop. This period also saw Beastie Boys reinventing themselves by distancing themselves from the frat boy image they portrayed on their Licensed to Ill album; harkening back to the group's roots in hardcore punk, Beastie Boys began playing live instruments again on their 1992 album Check Your Head, a "groundbreaking record that captured suburban skateboard culture with a goofy melding of rap, rock, funk, and thrash" and this album, along with their follow-up, Ill Communication, demonstrated that rock, hip hop and jazz could coexist on a single album. However, the genre had developed a bad aesthetic reputation, owing to "a series of ill-advised, record-company driven projects" which included the soundtrack album to the film Judgment Night (1993), which featured rock artists collaborating with rappers on every track, the results of which Slate described as being "lumpy and uneven" in its fusion of rap with grunge and metal; Slate wrote, "the subsequent corporate rap rock of the '90s followed the blander, more conservative examples of fusion to be found on Judgment Night." In the book Is Hip Hop Dead? The Past, Present, and Future of America's Most Wanted Music, author Mickey Hess identifies Kid Rock as connecting hip hop music to rap rock, due to the musician having started out as a hip hop artist, before shifting his style from sample-based hip hop to guitar-driven alternative rock that fused hip hop beats, boasting and fashion with hard rock guitar and Southern rock attitude, influenced by classic rock and country music. After releasing "two albums of pure Beastie Boys worship", including his first rap rock album, The Polyfuze Method (1993), Kid Rock began to explore his Southern rock influences on Early Mornin' Stoned Pimp (1996), and Devil Without a Cause (1998), the latter of which "extended the lineage of rap-rock" with an album that sold over 14 million copies, and helped to "ignite the rap-rock genre".

=== Golden age rap rock (late 1990s) ===
The late 1990s has been cited as rap rock's "golden age". Separate from rap rock, but developing popularity around the same time in the late 1990s, was nu metal. Nu metal would ultimately be conflated with rap rock, although the two genres did not have much in common. However, the Woodstock '99 festival and the band Limp Bizkit would wind up linking, as well as shifting critical opinion of both genres from the acclaim they'd initially received to near-universal disdain. The band's frontman, Fred Durst, grew up with hip hop music, and Limp Bizkit would have a stronger connection to rap rock than any previous artist in nu metal, including having former House of Pain turntablist DJ Lethal as part of their line-up. The release of Limp Bizkit's 1999 album Significant Other was pinpointed as a breakthrough for rap rock. Selling more than 7 million copies, and featuring the hit single "Nookie" as well as a guest appearance by Wu-Tang Clan rapper Method Man, Significant Other demonstrated the commercial viability of rap rock by "drawing from Rage's metallic aggression and the Beastie Boys' skateboard-slacker attitude". However, Limp Bizkit's performance at Woodstock '99 was linked to festival violence. The festival featured performances by multiple rap rock artists, including Limp Bizkit, Kid Rock, Insane Clown Posse and Rage Against the Machine, all of which were considered the "breakout stars" of the festival. However, despite these performances being well received, Limp Bizkit's performance was subject to national controversy as violence and vandalism occurred during and after the band's performance; this included fans tearing plywood from the walls during a performance of their song "Break Stuff". Durst stated during the concert, "Don't let anybody get hurt. But I don't think you should mellow out. That's what Alanis Morissette had you motherfuckers do. If someone falls, pick 'em up." Durst said during a performance of the band's hit song "Nookie", "We already let all the negative energy out. Its time to reach down and bring that positive energy to this motherfucker. Its time to let yourself go right now, 'cause there are no motherfuckin' rules out there." Eyewitnesses also reported a crowd-surfing woman being pulled down into the crowd and assaulted in the mosh pit during Limp Bizkit's set. Widely blamed for inciting the crowd to violence, Durst later stated in an interview, "I didn't see anybody getting hurt. You don't see that. When you're looking out on a sea of people and the stage is twenty feet [6 m] in the air and you're performing, and you're feeling your music, how do they expect us to see something bad going on?" Former Limp Bizkit manager Peter Katsis defended Durst in an interview for Netflix's 2022 documentary on the festival, claiming that "pointing the finger at Fred is about the last thing anybody should do. There really isn't a way to control 300,000 people. The best thing he could do is put on the best show possible, and that's what he did.". Their third album, Chocolate Starfish and the Hot Dog Flavored Water, debuted at number one on the Billboard 200, selling 1,054,511 copies in its first week of being released, with 400,000 of those copies being sold in the album's first day of release making it the largest first-week sales debut for a rock album in the United States.

Crazy Town was met with more ire from metal purists than any other rap rock band due to looking more like a hip hop crew than a metal band. Crazy Town's music and image reflected the band members' background in the underground hip hop scene in Los Angeles, anticipating nu metal. Their lyrics reflected "one of the most dynamic and volatile sociocultural environments on the planet [...] where the urban squalor of the South Central district exists just minutes away from the glitz of Beverly Hills." Rapper KRS-One recorded a guest appearance for the band's debut album The Gift of Game. Although Crazy Town were best known for having a rap metal sound, their biggest hit, "Butterfly", was "decidedly hip-hop". "Butterfly" would be the only Hot 100 hit by a rap rock act. According to Vulture, the 1990s were capped off by the short-lived late-90s sitcom Shasta McNasty, which encapsulated numerous 1990s trends in its depiction of a fictional rap rock band, brought the genre to primetime.

=== Further developments (2000s to 2020s) ===
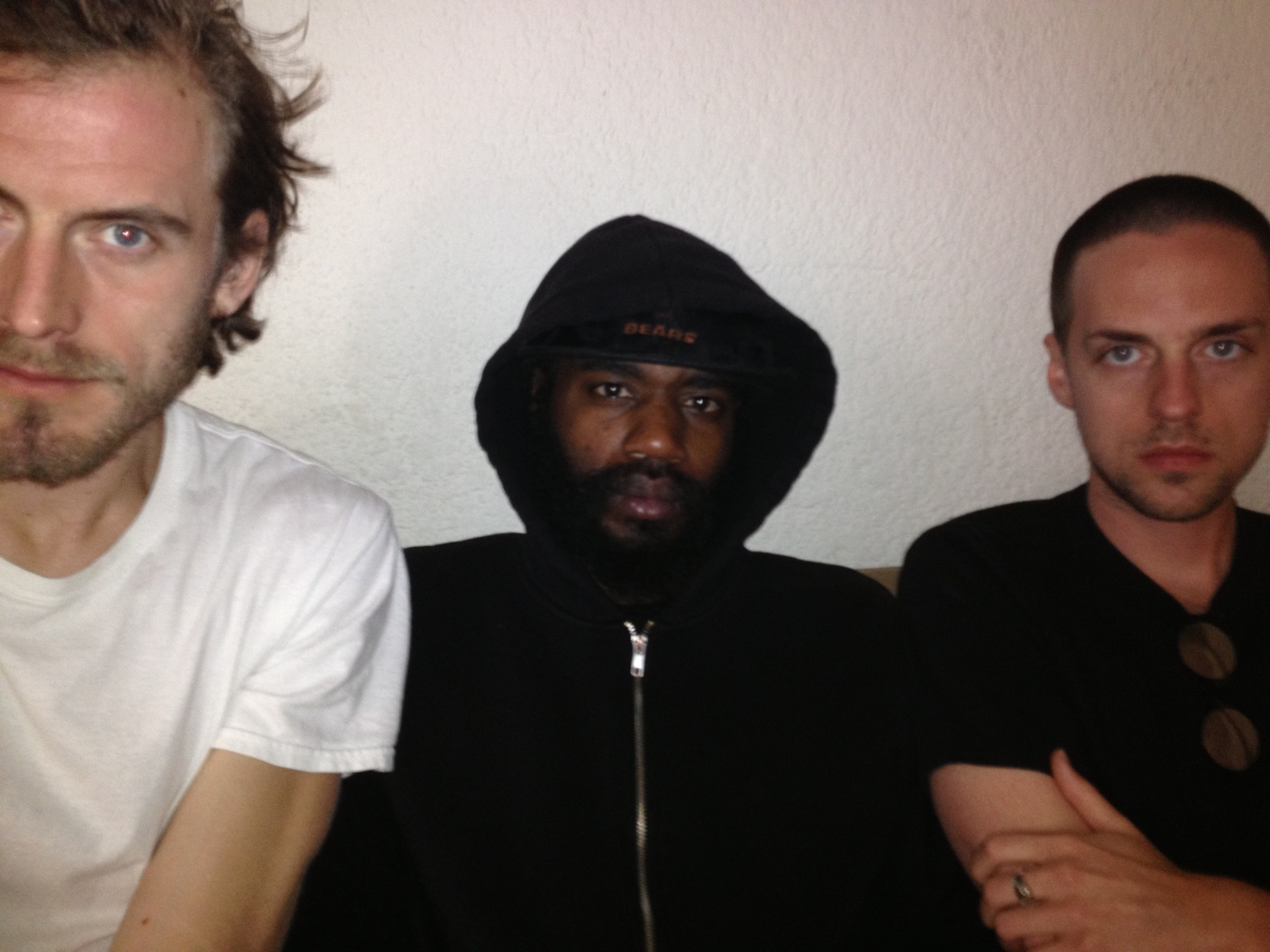
Death Grips received acclaim for their 2011 rap rock mixtape Exmilitary.

The style of crunk developed by Lil Jon was categorized as a "southern rap take on punk, which prioritised uncomfortably loud horns and repetitive screams." Linkin Park debuted in 2000 with their album Hybrid Theory and would continue to be the most visible rap rock group of the 21st century, going as far as to collaborate with rapper Jay-Z on the 2004 release Collision Course. Subsequently, Kid Rock and Linkin Park's styles changed, with Kid Rock having shifted to a country rock sound. Hollywood Undead was seen as a revival of the rap rock sound, although they considered themselves a rock band with hip hop influences, rather than a rap rock band. Cage's 2009 album Depart from Me was a departure from the rapper's previous sample-driven sound, in favor of "surging bass, mountains of guitar feedback, and fuzzy synth" on rap rock tracks that "wouldn't sound out of place on alternative-rock radio". HotNewHipHop said that Kid Cudi blurred the lines between genres with his album Man on the Moon II (2010), which contained collaborations with indie rock artists St. Vincent and HAIM, and would deliver further into rock on his albums WZRD (2012) and Speedin' Bullet 2 Heaven (2015). The publication suggested that the negative reception to the latter two albums, as well as Lil Wayne's Rebirth (2010), were "glaring examples of the music media immediately shutting down Black artists for stepping outside of the confines of what is deemed as 'Black music.'" The publication also said that Lil Wayne's use of autotune on the album and its "raw rock attitude" would prove "to be highly influential on the next generation of rap rockstars." By 2011, the Milwaukee Journal Sentinel reported that rap rock "seemed [...] dead". However, that year saw the release of several acclaimed rap rock projects, including Wugazi, a mashup mixtape in which raps by Wu-Tang Clan were paired with instrumentals by the band Fugazi, and the rap rock mixtape Exmilitary by the band Death Grips, which "[coupled] contemporary avant-rock techniques with underground rap sonics"; while some of the mixtape's samples and influences were more mainstream, such as a sample of a David Bowie song, most of the mixtape's samples came from American underground bands like Black Flag and Minutemen. Twenty One Pilots composed the rap rock songs "Stressed Out" and "Heathens", which both peaked at number two on the Billboard Hot 100 in 2016.

In 2017, Pitchfork wrote, "if, at some point, you made a name for yourself through combining rap and rock, chances are you either distance yourself vigorously from such efforts now or have learned to adjust to life as a walking joke." In 2018, conversely, The A.V. Club wrote that "rap-rock as we once knew it as dead", while HotNewHipHop said that the genre showed "no signs of stopping". The late 2010s saw the emergence of female rap rock artists such as Princess Nokia, Rico Nasty and Bali Baby, diverging from the typically male-dominated rap rock acts of the past.

In 2020, NME writer Kyann-Sian Williams reported a resurgence in rap rock, which fans dubbed "glock rock" due to the unfavorable reputation of rap rock. Williams cited as representatives of glock rock, Lil Uzi Vert, a punk rock-influenced rapper who identified as a "rockstar" and cited Marilyn Manson as their all-time favorite musical artist, Machine Gun Kelly, a rapper influenced by emo and pop punk, City Morgue, a group that "mixed thrash metal with pulsating 808s", as well as Trippie Redd, Post Malone, Clever and The Kid LAROI. Also emerging in this period was Oxymorrons, a rap rock group described as being "too rock for hip-hop [and] too hip-hop for rock"; Kerrang! writer Sophie K. described them as "a talented rock band who are able to properly rap with authenticity as well, seamlessly switching between clean vocals, electronics, fuzzy guitars and angsty rap vocals". Rappers dominated the rock charts throughout 2020.

== See also ==
- List of rap rock bands
