= Christmas Eve (Kelly Clarkson song) =

2017 single by Kelly Clarkson

Single by Kelly Clarkson
- Released: November 30, 2017
- Recorded: 2017
- Studio: Glenwood Place Studios (Burbank, CA); Southern Ground (Nashville, TN); Ocean Way Recording (Nashville, TN)
- Length: 3:00
- Label: Atlantic
- Songwriters: Kelly Clarkson; Jason Halbert
- Producer: Jason Halbert

Kelly Clarkson singles chronology
"Love So Soft" (2017)	"Christmas Eve" (2017)	"I Don't Think About You" (2018)

"Christmas Eve" is a song by American singer Kelly Clarkson. Written by Clarkson with Jason Halbert, who produced it, it is a Christmas-themed song about witnessing the festive joys of the Christmas season, primarily on Christmas Eve. Released as a companion track to Clarkson's children's book River Rose and the Magical Christmas, it was later issued as a single by Atlantic Records on November 30, 2017. The song is included on Clarkson's second Christmas album, When Christmas Comes Around... (2021).

== Background and release ==
Lyrically, the song is a celebration of the Christmas season. It was intended to accompany the release of Clarkson's second children's book River Rose and the Magical Christmas which, unlike its predecessor, River Rose and the Magical Lullaby, has a full original song unrelated to the accompanying material. Clarkson wrote the track from the perspective of elves making preparations for the holiday, while also proposing it as a prospective inclusion on her Christmas album Wrapped in Red (2013).

"Christmas Eve" was originally released by Atlantic Records o October 20, 2017, four days before the release of The Magical Christmas. A live recording of the song was also issued as a single exclusively on the Spotify streaming service on November 30, 2017. Clarkson revealed that she did not intend the record to be a single, but a positive response from the public prompted Atlantic to release it. She remarked, "It's literally so fun to sing and it just kind of puts you in this happy mood that gets you ready for Christmas," and added that "it's cool because it was like a happy accident. It wasn't supposed to even be, like, a big thing".

== Reception ==
Billboard's Tatiana Tenreyro observed that the song's bells and a jubilant horn-filled melody capture the magic of the holidays. Entertainment Weekly described it as a joyful and uplifting song that masterfully showcases her voice, accompanied by the sounds of tambourines, drums, and jingle bells.

In the US, "Christmas Eve" made its debut chart appearance on the Billboard Adult Contemporary chart, where it reached number two, becoming her first top two hit since "Wrapped in Red" in 2014. Elsewhere, it charted on the Billboard Canada AC, Billboard Canada Hot AC, and the national charts of Austria and Germany.

== Track listing ==
Digital download

No.	Title	Length
1.	"Christmas Eve"	3:00

Digital streaming

No.	Title	Length
1.	"Christmas Eve" (Recorded at Spotify Studios NYC)	2:55

== Personnel ==
Credits taken from Tidal.

- Lead vocals – Kelly Clarkson
- Backing vocals – Bridget Sarai, Jessi Collins
- Songwriters – Kelly Clarkson, Jason Halbert
- Arranger and conductor – Joseph Trapanese
- Producer, organ and piano – Jason Halbert
- Mixing engineer – John Hanes
- Mastering engineers – Chris Gehringer, Will Quinnell
- Engineers – Shane Wilson, Nick Spezia, John Denosky, Jason Halbert
- Bass – Craig Nelson, Mark Hill, Jack Jezzerio
- Cello – Anthony Lamarchina, Kevin Bate, Sari Reist, Nicholas Gold
- Contractor – Alan Umstead
- Coordinator – Booker White
- Drums – Lester Estelle
- Flute – Leslie Fagan, Erik Gratton
- French Horn – Jennifer Kummer, Anna Spina
- Guitar – Aben Eubanks
- Mixer – Serban Ghenea
- Percussion – Ron Sorbo
- Saxophone – Jimmy Bowland
- Timpani – Ron Sorbo
- Viola – Charles Dixon, Hari Bernstein, Bruce Christensen, Jim Grosjean, Idalynn Besser, Shu-Zheng
- Violin – Ryan Cockman, Isabel Bartles, Jung-Min Shin, Amy Helman, Maria Conti, Mary Kathryn Vanosdale, Janet Darnall, Gerald Greer, Conni Ellisor, Bruce Wethey, Alan Umstead, Erin Hall, Alicia Enstrom, Peter Povey, Karen Winkelmann, Jenny Bifano, Catherine Umstead, Ali Gooding

== Charts ==
=== Weekly charts ===
Chart (2017–18)	Peak position
Austria (Ö3 Austria Top 40)	72
Canada AC (Billboard)	3
Canada Hot AC (Billboard)	45
Germany (GfK)	64
US Adult Contemporary (Billboard)	2

=== Year-end charts ===
Chart (2018)	Position
US Adult Contemporary (Billboard)	48

== Release history ==
List of releases, showing region, date, format, version, record label, and catalog number
Region	Date	Format	Version	Label	Catalog number	Ref.
Various	October 19, 2017	Digital download; streaming	—N/a	Atlantic	USAT21704314	
Various	November 30, 2017	Streaming	Recorded at Spotify Studios NYC	Atlantic	USAT21705124	
Netherlands	December 9, 2017	Top 40 radio	—N/a	Atlantic	—N/a	
