= List of awards and nominations received by Kelly Clarkson =

Kelly Clarkson awards and nominations
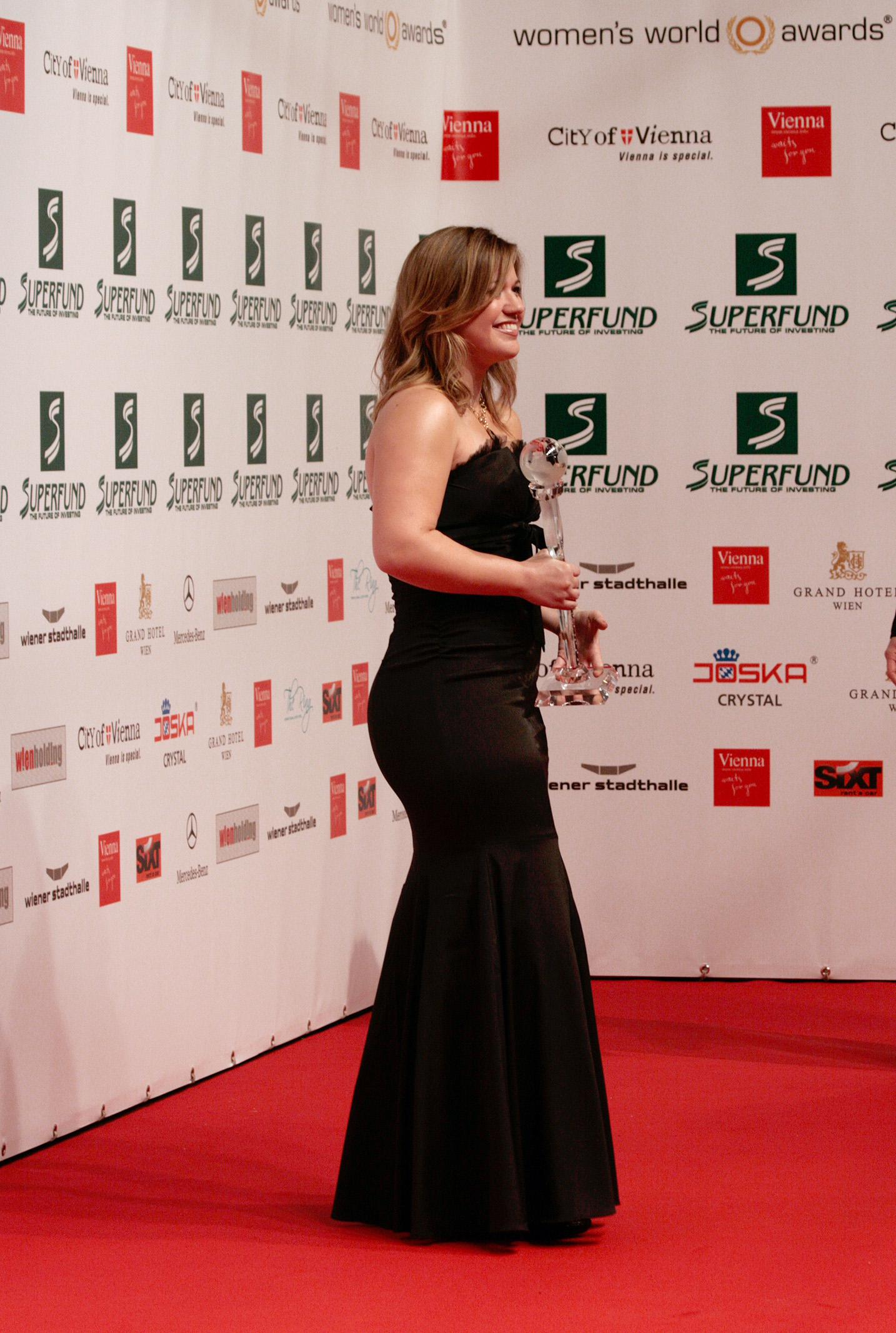
- Clarkson with her Women's World Award in 2009
Awards and nominations
Award	Wins	Nominations
American Music Awards	4	9
Billboard	0	5
Brit	0	2
CMT	0	3
Grammy	3	17
Juno	0	1
Meteor Music	0	1
MTV Asia	1	1
MTV Australia	0	2
MTV VMA	3	11
Much	1	5
Nickelodeon Kids' Choice	1	2
People's Choice	3	6
Radio Music	1	6
Teen Choice	6	21
TMF Belgium	3	3
World Music	0	11
Academy of Country Music	2	5
Billboard Women in Music	1	1
Daytime Emmy	9	15

Totals (Note: Certain award groups do not simply award one winner. They acknowledge several different recipients, have runners-up, and have third place. Since this is a specific recognition and is different from losing an award, runner-up mentions are considered wins in this award tally. For simplification and to avoid errors, each award in this list has been presumed to have had a prior nomination.)
- Wins: 88
- Nominations: 201

American singer-songwriter and talk show host Kelly Clarkson has been honored with numerous accolades for her work in music and television. She came into prominence after becoming the original winner of the American television competition series American Idol in 2002. Her debut studio album Thankful was released in a year later and produced the hit single "Miss Independent" which was nominated for a Grammy Award for Best Female Pop Vocal Performance and a MTV Video Music Award for Best New Artist in a Video. Her sophomore studio album Breakaway, released in 2004, won a Grammy Award for Best Pop Vocal Album and was nominated for an American Music Award and a Juno Award. Its lead single "Since U Been Gone" won a Grammy Award for Best Female Pop Vocal Performance and two MTV Video Music Awards, while its follow-up single "Because of You" also won an MTV Video Music Award and was bestowed by the American Society of Composers, Authors and Publishers for its Pop Song of the Year award.

Clarkson's third studio album My December was released in 2007. That same year, she released a duet recording of "Because of You" with American country music singer Reba McEntire which was nominated for various country music awards, including a Grammy Award nomination for Best Country Collaboration with Vocals. Released in 2009, her fourth studio album All I Ever Wanted merited a consideration for a Grammy Award for Best Pop Vocal Album. Its lead single "My Life Would Suck Without You" received a MTV Video Music Award nomination. Her collaboration with American recording artist Jason Aldean titled "Don't You Wanna Stay" was released in the following year and has received several country music awards and nominations, including a Grammy Award nomination for Best Country Duo/Group Performance.

Clarkson's fifth studio album Stronger was released in 2011, and won a Grammy Award for Best Pop Vocal Album in 2013, making her the first artist to win the award more than once. Its single "Stronger (What Doesn't Kill You)" also received three Grammy Award considerations, including a nomination for Record of the Year. Her two subsequent album releases Greatest Hits – Chapter One and Wrapped in Red both received World Music Award nominations. In addition, Chapter One's single "Don't Rush", featuring American musician Vince Gill, also received a Grammy Award nomination for Best Country Duo/Group Performance. Clarkson's seventh studio album Piece by Piece was released in 2015, and was nominated for a Grammy Award for Best Pop Vocal Album—earning her the record for most nominations for an artist in the category. Two of the album's singles "Heartbeat Song" and an alternate version of "Piece by Piece" were also nominated for a Grammy Award for Best Pop Solo Performance. Her eighth studio album Meaning of Life was released in 2017, and earned her a record fifth nomination for the Grammy Award for Best Pop Vocal Album. "Love So Soft" became her fourth single to be nominated for Best Pop Solo Performance. For hosting the daytime talk show The Kelly Clarkson Show, she has received nine Daytime Emmy Awards, including for Outstanding Entertainment Talk Show Host and Outstanding Talk Show Entertainment. Her tenth studio album, Chemistry, was released in 2023, and earned her a sixth nomination for the Grammy Award for Best Pop Vocal Album, making her the most nominated performer in the category.

== Academy of Country Music Awards ==
Presented by the Academy of Country Music, the Academy of Country Music Awards was the first program to award achievements in the country music industry. In 2012, Clarkson won two awards for the single "Don't You Wanna Stay". She has also received three other nominations.

Year	Nominee(s) / Work	Category	Result	Ref.
2008	"Because of You" (with Reba McEntire)	Vocal Event of the Year	Nominated	
2012	"Don't You Wanna Stay" (with Jason Aldean)	Single Record of the Year	Won	
2012	"Don't You Wanna Stay" (with Jason Aldean)	Vocal Event of the Year	Won	
2013	"Don't Rush" (featuring Vince Gill)	Vocal Event of the Year	Nominated	
2019	"Keeping Score" (with Dan + Shay)	Music Event of the Year	Nominated	

== American Country Awards ==
Broadcast by the Fox Broadcasting Company from 2010 to 2013, the American Country Awards was an annual music awards show where winners were voted by the country music audiences. Clarkson won two awards in 2011. She was subsequently nominated for two awards in 2013.

Year	Nominee(s) / Work	Category	Result	Ref.
2011	"Don't You Wanna Stay" (with Jason Aldean)	Single of the Year: Vocal Collaboration	Won	
2011	"Don't You Wanna Stay" (with Jason Aldean)	Video of the Year: Group, Duo or Collaboration	Won	
2013	Kelly Clarkson	Female Artist of the Year	Nominated	
2013	"Don't Rush" (featuring Vince Gill)	Single by a Vocal Collaboration	Nominated	

== American Music Awards ==
Created by television entertainer Dick Clark through his production company, the American Music Awards is the world's biggest public-voted music awarding presentation, where the nominees are selected based on their commercial performance. Clarkson has won four awards from nine nominations, including the Artist of the Year award in 2005.

Year	Nominee / Work	Category	Result	Ref.
2003	Kelly Clarkson	Favorite Pop/Rock New Artist	Nominated	
2005	Kelly Clarkson	Artist of the Year	Won	
2005	Kelly Clarkson	Favorite Pop/Rock Female Artist	Nominated	
2005	Kelly Clarkson	Favorite Adult Contemporary Artist	Won	
2005	Breakaway	Favorite Pop/Rock Album	Nominated	
2006	Kelly Clarkson	Favorite Pop/Rock Female Artist	Won	
2006	Kelly Clarkson	Favorite Adult Contemporary Artist	Won	
2012	Kelly Clarkson	Favorite Pop/Rock Female Artist	Nominated	
2012	Kelly Clarkson	Favorite Adult Contemporary Artist	Nominated	

== AOL Instant Messenger Best Musical Buddy Award ==
The AOL Instant Messenger Best Musical Buddy Award was given by AOL with the public voting on which musical artist they would most like on their instant messenger buddy list. Clarkson received the award in 2005.

Year	Nominated work	Category	Result	Ref.
2005	Self	AIM Best Musical Buddy	Won	

== AOL Moviegoer Awards ==
The AOL Moviegoer Awards were held by AOL for accomplishments in feature films as voted the film audiences across the United States. Clarkson received an award for her song "The Trouble with Love Is", from the film Love Actually in the 2003 gala.

Year	Nominated work	Category	Result	Ref.
2003	"The Trouble with Love Is"	Hottest Song	Won	

== ASCAP Music Awards ==
Organized by the American Society of Composers, Authors and Publishers (ASCAP), the ASCAP Music Awards program honors the most-performed and outstanding songs written by their members. Clarkson, who became an ASCAP member in 2004, has received nine honors from the organization, including the Song of the Year award in 2007.

=== ASCAP Country Music Awards ===
Year	Nominated work	Category	Result	Ref.
2008	"Because of You"	Most Performed Song	Honored	

=== ASCAP Pop Music Awards ===
Year	Nominated work	Category	Result	Ref.
2006	"Behind These Hazel Eyes"	Most Performed Song	Honored	
2007	"Because of You"	Song of the Year	Honored	
2007	"Because of You"	Most Performed Song	Honored	
2007	"Behind These Hazel Eyes"	Most Performed Song	Honored	
2007	"Walk Away"	Most Performed Song	Honored	
2010	"Already Gone"	Most Performed Song	Honored	
2011	"Already Gone"	Most Performed Song	Honored	
2014	"Catch My Breath"	Most Performed Song	Honored	

== Billboard Awards ==
=== Billboard Music Awards ===
The Billboard Music Awards, which celebrates chart performance achievements in the American music scene, are awarded annually by the music industry publication Billboard. Clarkson has been nominated five times.

Year	Nominee / Work	Category	Result	Ref.
2005	Kelly Clarkson	Artist of the Year	Nominated	
2005	Kelly Clarkson	Female Billboard 200 Album Artist of the Year	Nominated	
2005	"Since U Been Gone"	Hot 100 Song of the Year	Nominated	
2005	"Since U Been Gone"	Hot 100 Airplay of the Year	Nominated	
2005	"Since U Been Gone"	Digital Song of the Year	Nominated	

=== Billboard Women in Music ===
The Billboard Women in Music is an annual event established by Billboard to recognize achievements and contributions of women in the music industry. Clarkson has been honored with the Powerhouse Award in 2017.

Year	Nominee	Category	Result	Ref.
2017	Kelly Clarkson	Powerhouse Award	Honored	

== Bravo Otto ==
The Bravo Otto is a German accolade honoring the excellence of performers in film, television, and music. Established in 1957, the award is presented annually, with winners selected by the readers of Bravo magazine. The award is presented in gold, silver, and bronze and, since 1996, an honorary platinum statuette presented for lifetime achievement.

Year	Nominee	Category	Result	Ref.
2005	Kelly Clarkson	Singer	Silver	

== Brit Awards ==
The Brit Awards is an annual awards showcase presented by the British Phonographic Industry for successes in British popular music. Clarkson was nominated in twice in 2006.

Year	Nominee	Category	Result	Ref.
2006	Kelly Clarkson	Best Pop Act	Nominated	
2006	Kelly Clarkson	Best International Female	Nominated	

== Country Music Association Awards ==
Organized by the Country Music Association (CMA), the Country Music Association Awards is the longest-running annual music awards program in American TV history, honoring achievements in country music. Clarkson has received a CMA award out of six nominations.

Year	Nominee(s) / Work	Category	Result	Ref.
2007	"Because of You" (with Reba McEntire)	Musical Event of the Year	Nominated	
2011	"Don't You Wanna Stay" (with Jason Aldean)	Single of the Year	Nominated	
2011	"Don't You Wanna Stay" (with Jason Aldean)	Musical Event of the Year	Won	
2012	Kelly Clarkson	Female Vocalist of the Year	Nominated	
2013	Kelly Clarkson	Female Vocalist of the Year	Nominated	
2013	"Don't Rush" (featuring Vince Gill)	Musical Event of the Year	Nominated	

== Critics' Choice Real TV Awards ==
The Critics' Choice Real TV Awards are accolades for nonfiction, unscripted and reality television content presented by the Critics Choice Association and NPACT. Clarkson has been nominated once.

Year	Nominated work	Category	Result	Ref.
2022	Critics' Choice Real TV Awards	Female Star of the Year	Nominated	

== Critics' Choice Television Awards ==
The Critics' Choice Television Award is awarded by the Broadcast Television Journalists Association. Clarkson has received six nominations.

Year	Nominated work	Category	Result	Ref.
2020	The Kelly Clarkson Show	Best Talk Show	Nominated	
2021	The Kelly Clarkson Show	Best Talk Show	Nominated	
2022	The Kelly Clarkson Show	Best Talk Show	Nominated	
2023	The Kelly Clarkson Show	Best Talk Show	Nominated	
2024	The Kelly Clarkson Show	Best Talk Show	Nominated	
2025	The Kelly Clarkson Show	Best Talk Show	Nominated	

== Daytime Emmy Awards ==
The Daytime Emmy Awards is an annual award show bestowed by the National Academy of Television Arts and Sciences in recognition of excellence in American daytime television programming. Clarkson has received nine awards out of fifteen nominations.

Year	Nominee / Work	Category	Result	Ref.
2020	The Kelly Clarkson Show	Outstanding Talk Show Entertainment	Nominated	
2020	Kelly Clarkson	Outstanding Entertainment Talk Show Host	Won	
2021	The Kelly Clarkson Show	Outstanding Talk Show Entertainment	Won	
2021	Kelly Clarkson	Outstanding Entertainment Talk Show Host	Won	
2021	"Cabana Boy Troy"	Outstanding Original Song	Nominated	
2022	The Kelly Clarkson Show	Outstanding Talk Show Entertainment	Won	
2022	Kelly Clarkson	Outstanding Entertainment Talk Show Host	Won	
2023	The Kelly Clarkson Show	Outstanding Daytime Talk Series	Won	
2023	Kelly Clarkson	Outstanding Daytime Talk Series Host	Won	
2024	The Kelly Clarkson Show	Outstanding Daytime Talk Series	Won	
2024	Kelly Clarkson	Outstanding Daytime Talk Series Host	Nominated	
2025	The Kelly Clarkson Show	Outstanding Daytime Talk Series	Nominated	
2025	Kelly Clarkson	Outstanding Daytime Talk Series Host	Nominated	
2026	The Kelly Clarkson Show	Outstanding Daytime Talk Series	Won	
2026	Kelly Clarkson	Outstanding Daytime Talk Series Host	Nominated	

== Dorian Awards ==
The Dorian Awards are an annual awards ceremony organized by the Gay and Lesbian Entertainment Critics Association (GALECA) for the finest in film and television accessible in the United States, across a variety of categories, from general to LGBTQ-centric. Clarkson has received a nomination in 2016.

Year	Nominated work	Category	Result	Ref.
2016	"Piece by Piece"	TV Musical Performance of the Year	Nominated	

== Echo Awards ==
The Echo Music Prize is an annual awards ceremony organized by the Deutsche Phono-Akademie (German Phonographic Academy) for achievements in the German music scene. Clarkson was nominated once in 2007.

Year	Nominee	Category	Result	Ref.
2007	Kelly Clarkson	Best International Rock/Pop Female Artist	Nominated	

== GLAAD Media Awards ==
The GLAAD Media Awards is an accolade bestowed by GLAAD to recognize and honor various branches of the media for their outstanding representations of the lesbian, gay, bisexual and transgender (LGBT) community and the issues that affect their lives. Clarkson has been nominated for two awards.

Year	Nominee	Category	Result	Ref.
2023	The Kelly Clarkson Show	Outstanding Variety or Talk Show Episode	Nominated	
2024	The Kelly Clarkson Show	Outstanding Variety or Talk Show Episode	Nominated	

== Golden Raspberry Awards ==
The Golden Raspberry Awards are annually presented by the Golden Raspberry Award Foundation in humorous commendation of the lamentable films of the year, as voted by affiliates whose membership were obtained from the organization's website.

Year	Nominated work	Category	Result	Ref.
2003	From Justin to Kelly	Worst Actress	Nominated	
2003	From Justin to Kelly	Worst Screen Couple (with Justin Guarini)	Nominated	

== Gracie Awards ==
The Gracie Awards celebrate and honor programs created for women by women, and about women, as well as individuals who have made exemplary contributions in electronic media and affiliates. They are presented by the Alliance for Women in Media Foundation (AWM). Clarkson has won two awards out of two nominations.

Year	Nominee(s) / Work	Category	Result	Ref.
2021	The Kelly Clarkson Show	Best Talk Show: Entertainment	Won	
2024	The Kelly Clarkson Show	Best Talk Show: Entertainment	Won	

== Grammy Awards ==
Promulgated as the premier honor in the American music industry, the Grammy Awards are annually presented by The Recording Academy for outstanding achievements and artistic excellence in the recording arts. Clarkson has won three Grammy Awards out of seventeen nominations. She also currently holds the record for most nominations for Best Pop Vocal Album and Best Pop Solo Performance with six and four merited considerations.

Year	Nominee(s) / Work	Category	Result	Ref.
2004	"Miss Independent"	Best Female Pop Vocal Performance	Nominated	
2006	"Since U Been Gone"	Best Female Pop Vocal Performance	Won	
2006	Breakaway	Best Pop Vocal Album	Won	
2008	"Because of You" (with Reba McEntire)	Best Country Collaboration with Vocals	Nominated	
2010	All I Ever Wanted	Best Pop Vocal Album	Nominated	
2012	"Don't You Wanna Stay" (with Jason Aldean)	Best Country Duo/Group Performance	Nominated	
2013	"Stronger (What Doesn't Kill You)"	Record of the Year	Nominated	
2013	"Stronger (What Doesn't Kill You)"	Best Pop Solo Performance	Nominated	
2013	Stronger	Best Pop Vocal Album	Won	
2014	"Don't Rush" (featuring Vince Gill)	Best Country Duo/Group Performance	Nominated	
2016	Piece by Piece	Best Pop Vocal Album	Nominated	
2016	"Heartbeat Song"	Best Pop Solo Performance	Nominated	
2017	"Piece by Piece" (Idol Version)	Best Pop Solo Performance	Nominated	
2018	"Love So Soft"	Best Pop Solo Performance	Nominated	
2019	Meaning of Life	Best Pop Vocal Album	Nominated	
2023	When Christmas Comes Around...	Best Traditional Pop Vocal Album	Nominated	
2024	Chemistry	Best Pop Vocal Album	Nominated	

== Hollywood Walk of Fame ==
The Hollywood Walk of Fame is a historic landmark which consists of more than 2,700 five-pointed terrazzo and brass stars embedded in the sidewalks along 15 blocks of Hollywood Boulevard and three blocks of Vine Street in Hollywood, California. The stars are permanent public monuments to achievement in the entertainment industry, bearing the names of a mix of actors, directors, producers, musicians, theatrical/musical groups, fictional characters, and others. Clarkson is part of the Class of 2021 of inductees.

Year	Recipient	Category	Result	Ref.
2022	Kelly Clarkson	Hollywood Walk of Fame Star	Won	

== iHeartRadio Music Awards ==
Sponsored by the radio platform iHeartRadio, the iHeartRadio Music Awards are presented to American radio's most successful artists and music of the year, as determined by the station's listeners. In 2016 and 2017, Clarkson received nominations for her cover version of Barbadian artist Rihanna's singles "Bitch Better Have My Money" (2015) and "Love on the Brain" (2016).

Year	Nominated work	Category	Result	Ref.
2016	"Bitch Better Have My Money"	Best Cover Song	Nominated	
2017	"Love on the Brain"	Best Cover Song	Nominated	

== International Dance Music Awards ==
Presented annually by the Winter Music Conference, the International Dance Music Awards recognize and honor exceptional achievements in the electronic dance music industry. Clarkson has received a nomination in 2006.

Year	Nominated work	Category	Result	Ref.
2006	"Since U Been Gone"	Best Pop Dance Track	Nominated	

== Juno Awards ==
Presented by the Canadian Academy of Recording Arts and Sciences, the Juno Awards showcase the accomplishments in the Canadian music scene every year. Clarkson received a nomination the 2006 awards event.

Year	Nominated work	Category	Result	Ref.
2006	Breakaway	International Album of the Year	Nominated	

== Los Premios 40 Principales ==
Los Premios 40 Principales is Spain's premier awards presentation honoring commercial successes in its music industry. Clarkson was nominated for the Best International New Artist award during its inaugural presentation in 2006.

Year	Nominee	Category	Result	Ref.
2006	Kelly Clarkson	Best International New Artist	Nominated	

== Meteor Ireland Music Awards ==
Presented from 2001 to 2010, the Meteor Ireland Music Awards honors the national and international achievements in the Irish recording industry. Clarkson has received a nomination in 2006.

Year	Nominee	Category	Result	Ref.
2006	Kelly Clarkson	Best International Female	Nominated	

== MuchMusic Video Awards ==
Produced by the Canadian channel MuchMusic, the MuchMusic Video Awards is an outdoor street awards program honoring music videos by Canadian and international artists. Clarkson has received an award in 2006.

Year	Nominated work	Category	Result	Ref.
2006	"Behind These Hazel Eyes"	Best International Video – Artist	Nominated	
2006	"Because of You"	People's Choice: Favorite International Artist	Won	
2009	"My Life Would Suck Without You"	Best International Video – Artist	Nominated	
2012	"Stronger (What Doesn't Kill You)"	Best International Video – Artist	Nominated	
2012	"Mr. Know It All"	Most Streamed Video of the Year	Nominated	

== OFM Music Awards ==
Produced by the South African radio station OFM, the OFM Music Awards is an awards program showcasing the most favored music in South Africa, where winners are selected by audiences in local and international categories. Clarkson has received an award in 2016.

Year	Nominated work	Category	Result	Ref.
2016	"Second Hand Heart"	International Song of the Year	Won	

== Paramount Media Networks awards ==
=== CMT Music Awards ===
The CMT Music Awards are presented by Paramount Media Networks' CMT channel for recognizing country music's outstanding video and musical achievements. Clarkson was nominated for the Collaborative Video of the Year award three times.

Year	Nominee(s) / Work	Category	Result	Ref.
2008	"Because of You" (with Reba McEntire)	Collaborative Video of the Year	Nominated	
2011	"Don't You Wanna Stay" (with Jason Aldean)	Collaborative Video of the Year	Nominated	
2013	"Don't Rush" (featuring Vince Gill) (from the 2012 CMA Awards)	Collaborative Video of the Year	Nominated	

=== CMT Online Awards ===
The CMT Online Awards were online awards organized by CMT dedicated to recognizing the year's best digital accomplishments in American country music. Clarkson has on won an award once in 2007.

Year	Nominee(s) / Work	Category	Result	Ref.
2007	"Because of You" (with Reba McEntire) (from the CMT Crossroads)	Number One Streamed Live Performance	Won	

=== Los Premios MTV Latinoamérica ===
Broadcast by Viacom International Media Networks – The Americas, the Los Premios MTV Latinoamérica is an annual TV special which celebrates the top artists appearing in music videos aired throughout Latin America by Paramount Global's video channels. Clarkson has received three nominations from 2005 to 2006.

Year	Nominee	Category	Result	Ref.
2005	Kelly Clarkson	Best International Pop Artist	Nominated	
2005	Kelly Clarkson	Best New International Artist	Nominated	
2006	Kelly Clarkson	Best International Pop Artist	Nominated	

=== MTV Asia Awards ===
Aired by MTV Networks Asia from 2006 to 2008, the MTV Asia Awards was a regional awards show recognizing the most successful Asian and international music artists. Clarkson has won an award in its 2006 program.

Year	Nominee	Category	Result	Ref.
2006	Kelly Clarkson	Best International Pop Artist	Won	

=== MTV Australia Video Music Awards ===
The MTV Australia Video Music Awards were awarded by MTV Networks Australia & New Zealand from 2005 to 2009 to recognize the best of Australian and international music in a variety of viewer-based categories. Clarkson has received two considerations for her music video "Because of You" in 2006.

Year	Nominated work	Category	Result	Ref.
2006	Kelly Clarkson	Best Female Artist	Nominated	
2006	Best Pop Video	"Because of You"	Nominated	

=== MTV Movie & TV Awards ===
The MTV Movie & TV Awards is a film and television awards shows presented annually on MTV. Originally the MTV Movie Awards it was rebranded as the MTV Movie & TV Awards in 2017, to also honor work in television. Clarkson has one win out of three nominations.

Year	Nominated work	Category	Result	Ref.
2022	Best Talk/Topical Show	The Kelly Clarkson Show	Nominated	
2022	Best Host	Kelly Clarkson	Won	
2023	Best Host	Kelly Clarkson	Nominated	

=== MTV Video Music Awards ===
The MTV Video Music Awards are annually presented by Viacom's flagship channel MTV to honor outstanding music videos having an impact on the youth pop culture. Clarkson has earned three Video Music Awards from eleven nominations.

Year	Nominated work	Category	Result	Ref.
2003	"Miss Independent"	Best New Artist in a Video	Nominated	
2003	"Miss Independent"	Best Pop Video	Nominated	
2003	"Miss Independent"	Viewer's Choice	Nominated	
2005	"Since U Been Gone"	Best Female Video	Won	
2005	"Since U Been Gone"	Best Pop Video	Won	
2005	"Since U Been Gone"	Viewer's Choice	Nominated	
2006	"Because of You"	Best Female Video	Won	
2006	"Because of You"	Viewer's Choice	Nominated	
2009	"My Life Would Suck Without You"	Best Female Video	Nominated	
2012	"Dark Side"	Best Video with a Social Message	Nominated	
2013	"People Like Us"	Best Video with a Social Message	Nominated	

=== Nickelodeon Kids' Choice Awards ===
The Nickelodeon Kids' Choice Awards are broadcast by Nickelodeon to honor American children audiences' favorite works in film, music, TV, and others as voted by its viewers. Clarkson has received one award out of two nominations.

Year	Nominee(s) / Work	Category	Result	Ref.
2006	Kelly Clarkson	Favorite Female Singer	Won	
2019	The Voice (with Blake Shelton, Jennifer Hudson, and Adam Levine)	Favorite TV Judges	Nominated	

=== Nickelodeon HALO Awards ===
The Nickelodeon HALO Awards profiles five teens who are Helping, And Leading Others. Each year there is a HALO Hall of Fame recipient. Clarkson was the honoree for 2017.

Year	Nominee	Category	Result	Ref.
2017	Kelly Clarkson	HALO Hall of Fame	Won	

=== TRL Awards ===
The TRL Awards were awarded by MTV's live television program Total Request Live (TRL) for the best performing music videos broadcast by the program, as voted by its viewers. Clarkson has received an award out of two nominations in the 2006 special.

Year	Nominee	Category	Result	Ref.
2006	Kelly Clarkson	TRL's First Lady	Nominated	
2006	Kelly Clarkson	Countdown Killer	Won	

=== TMF Award ===
Broadcast by MTV Networks Northern Europe's TMF channel in Belgium from 1999 to 2009, the TMF Awards awards achievements in the music scene of the Dutch-speaking regions to local and international artists. Clarkson received three awards.

Year	Nominee	Category	Result	Ref.
2005	Kelly Clarkson	Best New Artist – International	Won	
2006	Kelly Clarkson	Best Female Artist – International	Won	
2006	Kelly Clarkson	Best Pop – International	Won	

== People's Choice Awards ==
The People's Choice Awards is an annual awards program recognizing popular culture successes in the entertainment industry, where winners are chosen based on general public polling. Clarkson has won three awards out of six nominations.

Year	Nominee	Category	Result	Ref.
2006	Kelly Clarkson	Favorite Female Musical Performer	Won	
2016	Kelly Clarkson	Favorite Pop Artist	Nominated	
2020	The Kelly Clarkson Show	Daytime Talk Show	Nominated	
2021	The Kelly Clarkson Show	Daytime Talk Show	Nominated	
2022	The Kelly Clarkson Show	Daytime Talk Show	Won	
2024	The Kelly Clarkson Show	Daytime Talk Show	Won	

== Pollstar Awards ==
The Pollstar Awards are awarded by the trade publication Pollstar to artists, management, talent buyers, venues, and support services for professionalism and achievements in the concert tour industry. Clarkson has received a nomination in 2009.

Year	Nominee(s) / Work	Category	Result	Ref.
2009	2 Worlds 2 Voices Tour (with Reba McEntire)	Most Creative Tour Package	Nominated	

== Premios Oye! ==
The Premios Nacional a la Música Grabada, popularly known as the Premios Oye!, are awarded by the Academia Nacional de la Música en México (National Academy of Music in Mexico) for excellence in the Mexican music industry. Clarkson was nominated once in the 2006 ceremony.

Year	Nominated work	Category	Result	Ref.
2006	"Because of You"	English Song of the Year	Nominated	

== Radio Disney Music Awards ==
Organized by the American radio network Radio Disney, the Radio Disney Music Awards awards the year's achievements in the teen pop music industry, as determined by the network's adolescent audiences. Clarkson had won three awards from fourteen nominations, including the Icon Award at the 2018 ceremony.

Year	Nominee / Work	Category	Result	Ref.
2003	"Miss Independent"	Best Song That Makes You Turn Up the Radio	Nominated	
2003	"Miss Independent"	Best Video That Rocks	Nominated	
2003	"Miss Independent"	Best Song to Sing Hairbrush Karaoke	Won	
2004	"Breakaway"	Best Homework Song	Nominated	
2004	"Breakaway"	Best Song to Air Guitars	Nominated	
2004	"Breakaway"	Best Video That Rocks	Nominated	
2006	Kelly Clarkson	Best Female Artist	Nominated	
2006	"Since U Been Gone"	Best Song You've Heard a Million Times and Still Love	Won	
2007	Kelly Clarkson	Best Female Artist	Nominated	
2007	Kelly Clarkson	Best Top 40 Artist	Nominated	
2007	"Never Again"	Best Song to Dance	Nominated	
2007	"Never Again"	Best Song to Wake Up To	Nominated	
2007	"Never Again"	Best Song to Sing to an Ex	Nominated	
2018	Kelly Clarkson	Icon Award	Won	

== Radio Music Awards ==
Presented from 1999 to 2005, the Radio Music Awards was an annual music awards gala lauding the outstanding commercial performances on American radio airplay, as monitored by music industry research firm Mediabase. Clarkson received one an award out of six nominations.

Year	Nominee / Work	Category	Result	Ref.
2003	"Miss Independent"	Song of the Year – Top 40 Radio	Nominated	
2005	Kelly Clarkson	Artist of the Year – Mainstream Hit Radio	Won	
2005	Kelly Clarkson	Artist of the Year – Adult Hit Radio	Nominated	
2005	"Behind These Hazel Eyes"	Song of the Year – Mainstream Hit Radio	Nominated	
2005	"Since U Been Gone"	Song of the Year – Mainstream Hit Radio	Nominated	
2005	"Breakaway"	Song of the Year – Adult Hit Radio	Nominated	

== Stinkers Bad Movie Awards ==
Presented from 1978 to 2006, The Stinkers Bad Movie Awards (formerly known as the Hastings Bad Cinema Society) was a Los Angeles-based group of film buffs and film critics devoted to honoring the worst films of the year. Clarkson has one award out of four nominations.

Year	Nominee / Work	Category	Result	Ref.
2003	Kelly Clarkson	Worst Actress	Nominated	
2003	"Anytime"	Worst Song or Song Performance in a Film or Its End Credits	Won	
2003	Worst On-Screen Couple	Kelly Clarkson/Justin Guarini	Nominated	
2003	Worst Annoying Fake Accent (Female)	Kelly Clarkson	Nominated	

== The Record of the Year ==
The Record of the Year was an award special televised by the ITV network where the winner is voted by the British audiences from a selection of the year's ten biggest-selling singles in the United Kingdom. Clarkson's song "Since U Been Gone" was shortlisted for 2005 prize.

Year	Nominated work	Category	Result	Ref.
2005	"Since U Been Gone"	The Record of the Year	Shortlisted	

== Teen Choice Awards ==
The Teen Choice Awards, organized by the Fox Broadcasting Company, is an annual TV special awarding the most influential in the cultural zeitgeist of adolescent audiences. Clarkson has won six awards out of twenty-one nominations, including a clean sweep in the 2005 program.

Year	Nominee(s) / Work	Category	Result	Ref.
2003	Kelly Clarkson	Choice Movie – Female Breakout Star	Nominated	
2003	Kelly Clarkson and Justin Guarini	Choice Movie – Chemistry	Nominated	
2003	Kelly Clarkson	Choice Music – Female Artist	Won	
2003	Kelly Clarkson	Choice Music – Breakout Artist	Nominated	
2003	Kelly Clarkson	Choice Music – Crossover Artist	Nominated	
2003	"A Moment Like This"	Choice Music – Love Song	Nominated	
2005	"Since U Been Gone"	Choice Music – Single	Won	
2005	Breakaway	Choice Music – Album	Won	
2005	Kelly Clarkson	Choice Music – Female Artist	Won	
2005	"Behind These Hazel Eyes"	Choice Music – Summer Song	Won	
2006	Kelly Clarkson	Choice Music – Female Artist	Won	
2006	"Walk Away"	Choice Music – Single	Nominated	
2007	"Never Again"	Choice Music – Payback Track	Nominated	
2009	"My Life Would Suck Without You"	Choice Music – Single	Nominated	
2010	Kelly Clarkson	Choice American Idol Alum	Nominated	
2012	"Stronger (What Doesn't Kill You)"	Choice Music Single – Female	Nominated	
2012	"Stronger (What Doesn't Kill You)"	Choice Music – Break Up Song	Nominated	
2015	"Heartbeat Song"	Choice Music Single – Female	Nominated	
2018	Kelly Clarkson	Choice TV Personality	Nominated	
2019	"Broken & Beautiful"	Choice Movie Song	Nominated	

== XM Nation Music Awards ==
Presented by XM Satellite Radio in 2005, the XM Nation Music Awards honor the year's most successful artists and songs on satellite radio airplay. Clarkson has won two awards from the 2005 awarding presentation.

Year	Nominee / Work	Award	Result	Ref.
2005	"Since U Been Gone"	Dashboard Anthem – Best Pop Sing-Along Song of 2005	Won	
2005	Kelly Clarkson	Pop Artist of the Year	Won	

== Women's World Awards ==
Presented by World Awards organization president Mikhail Gorbachev, the Women's World Awards are awarded to exemplary women whose achievements contribute to furthering self-determination, gender equality, freedom and the elimination of all forms of social and economic discrimination. Queen Noor of Jordan personally bestowed Clarkson with the World Entertainment Award for facilitating in popularizing a new entertainment genre that has become a worldwide success in 2009.

Year	Nominee	Award	Result	Ref.
2009	Kelly Clarkson	World Entertainment Award	Honored	

== World Music Awards ==
The World Music Awards honor the world's best-selling artists and recordings as determined by worldwide sales figures provided by the International Federation of the Phonographic Industry. Clarkson has accumulated a total of eleven nominations.

Year	Nominee / Work	Award	Result	Ref.
2004	Kelly Clarkson	World's Best New Female Artist	Nominated	
2005	Kelly Clarkson	World's Best-Selling Pop Female Artist	Nominated	
2014	Kelly Clarkson	World's Best Entertainer Of The Year	Nominated	
2014	Kelly Clarkson	World's Best Female Artist	Nominated	
2014	Kelly Clarkson	World's Best Live Act	Nominated	
2014	"Stronger (What Doesn't Kill You)"	World's Best Song	Nominated	
2014	"Stronger (What Doesn't Kill You)"	World's Best Video	Nominated	
2014	"People Like Us"	World's Best Song	Nominated	
2014	"People Like Us"	World's Best Video	Nominated	
2014	Greatest Hits – Chapter One	World's Best Album	Nominated	
2014	Wrapped in Red	World's Best Album	Nominated	
