= Molly Kate Kestner =

American singer

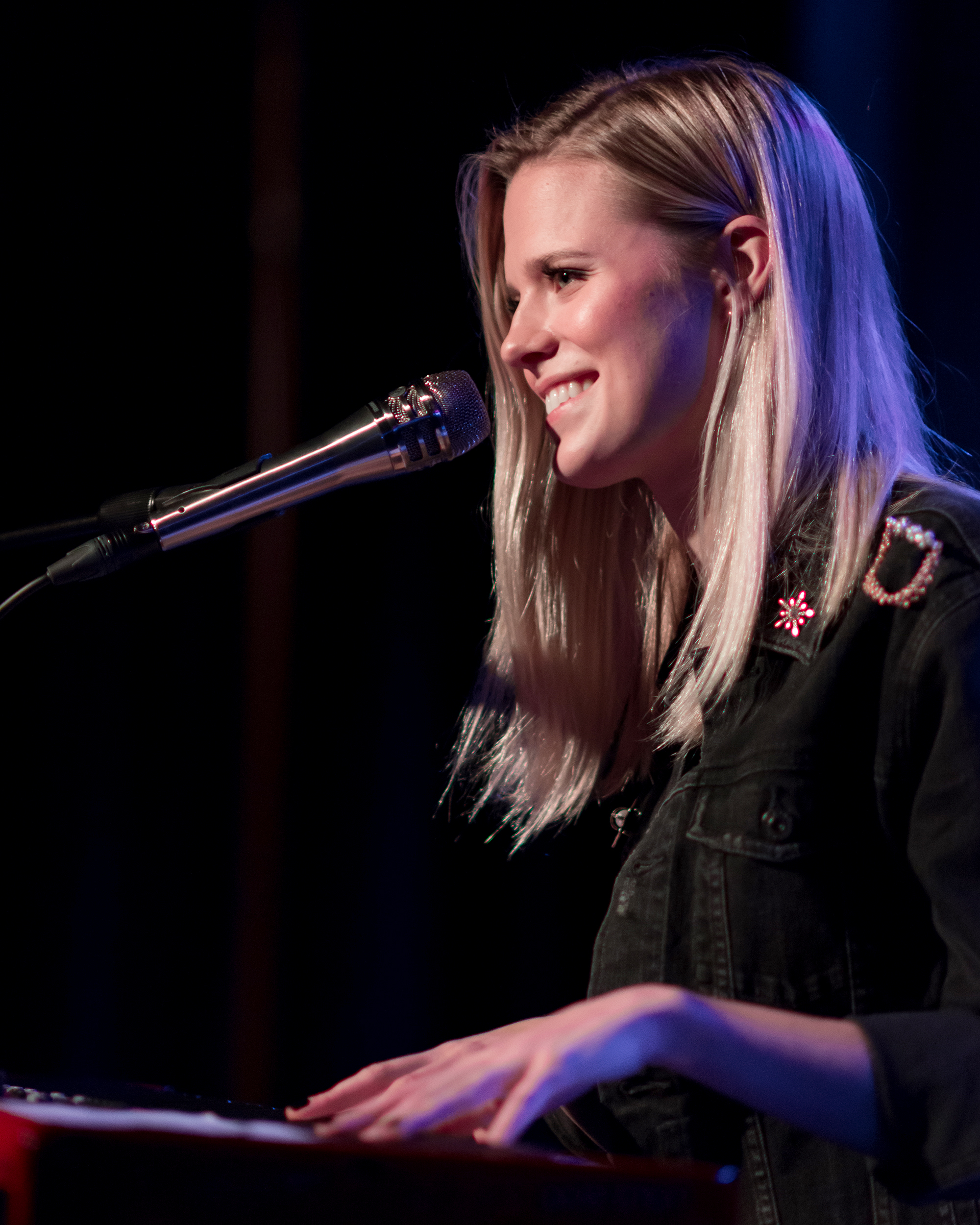
- Kestner performing in 2017

Background information
- Born: November 29, 1995 (age 30); Freeborn County, Minnesota, US
- Origin: Austin, Minnesota
- Genre: Pop
- Occupation: Singer
- Instruments: Vocals, piano, violin
- Years active: 2013–present
- Label: Atlantic Records

Molly Kate Kestner (born November 29, 1995) is an American singer-songwriter most notable for her song "His Daughter", which went viral in 2014 in many countries. After the release of her debut self-released single, Kestner was signed to Atlantic Records and has released seven major label singles since joining their roster.

== Early life ==
Kestner is one of seven siblings in her family.

Before the success of "His Daughter", Kestner performed covers and original material, and put them on YouTube for extended family members too far away from her and her family. In addition to singing and piano, Kestner is also an accomplished violinist. Kestner was a member of the 2012–2013 Minnesota Music Educators Association All-State Mixed Choir.

== Success of "His Daughter" ==
"His Daughter"

Single by Molly Kate Kestner
- Released: May 12, 2014
- Recorded: 2014
- Genre: Pop
- Length: 5:57
- Label: Broken Phone Productions
- Songwriter: Molly Kate Kestner

Molly Kate Kestner singles chronology
"His Daughter" (2014)	"Good Die Young" (2016)

Music video
- "His Daughter" (Official video) on YouTube

"His Daughter" is a song written by Kestner that chronicles a woman that has an unplanned pregnancy.

Her video later brought the attention of Star Trek actor George Takei, who commented on his Facebook page "Has America found its young Adele? I'm nearly breathless from listening." "His Daughter" also received attention from singer Jordin Sparks. Kestner's video later gained 2 million+ views after Takei and Sparks shared Kestner's video. Kestner later performed the song on Good Morning America.

Kestner later released a studio version of "His Daughter" on iTunes.

== Discography ==
=== Singles ===
- "His Daughter" (2014)
- "Good Die Young" (2016)
- "Prom Queen" (2017)
- "It's You" (2017)
- "I Don't Know" (2017)
- "Compromise" (2017)
- "Footprints" (2017)
- "Not Over You" (2018)
- "On Again" (with Honors)(2018)
- "Prisoner" (2018)
- "My Way Up" (2019)
- "Get Up" (2021)
- "Troubles" (2021)
- "Bridges" (2021)
- "Better Than My Best" (2021)
- "Used to Be You" (2021)
- "Hiding in the Crowd" (2021)
- "Small Town Stars" (2022)
- "Hand That You Hold" (2022)
- "Blame It on the Weather" (2022)

=== Songwriting credits ===
Year	Title	Artist(s)	Album	Written with
2017	"Move You"	Kelly Clarkson	Meaning of Life	Amy Kuney, Nick Ruth
2017	"Slow Dance"	Kelly Clarkson	Meaning of Life	Amy Kuney, Nick Ruth

== Personal life ==
Kestner married singer-songwriter Brock Baker in 2016.
