= River Rose and the Magical Christmas =

Book by Kelly Clarkson

- Book cover
- Author: Kelly Clarkson
- Illustrator: Lucy Fleming
- Language: English
- Series: River Rose
- Genre: Children's literature
- Publisher: HarperCollins
- Publication date: October 24, 2017
- Publication place: United States
- Pages: 32
- ISBN: 978-0-0626-9764-6
- Preceded by: River Rose and the Magical Lullaby

River Rose and the Magical Christmas is a Christmas children's picture book written by American singer Kelly Clarkson and published by HarperCollins on October 24, 2017. Illustrated by Lucy Fleming, it is the second installment of the River Rose series of pictures books written by Clarkson. The story centers on a little girl's adventure with her dog to visit Santa Claus in the North Pole on the night before Christmas.

== Premise ==
It's Christmas Eve, and River Rose wants to stay up all night to hand-deliver a letter to Santa Claus. She can't wait to finally meet the man in red. River Rose and her dog, Joplin, have fallen asleep and been swept off on another magical adventure. This time, they're off to the North Pole to let Santa know what she really wants for Christmas.

== Background and publication ==
The Magical Christmas was inspired by Clarkson's daughter's love for the holiday season. She explained, "She's at such a fun age... It’s a fun time for kids and Christmas. And she just gets so excited about it and I thought it would be a fun book for her to get to read." She also added that a year after announcing the release of the first book, she felt it was the right time to make another installment to the series, focusing on Christmas. On June 28, 2017, HarperCollins announced that the book will be released on October 24, 2017.

Unlike its predecessor, Clarkson wrote a full song to accompany the book's release. Titled "Christmas Eve", she wrote it as a prospective song from her Christmas album, Wrapped in Red (2013). According to Clarkson, the song's lyrical content will differ from the book, focusing itself on the viewpoint of elves of Christmas preparations.
