= Move You =

Promotional single by Kelly Clarkson

from the album Meaning of Life
- A-side: "Love So Soft"
- Released: September 7, 2017
- Recorded: 2017
- Studio: Mac & Milo's Den (Venice Beach, CA); Starstruck Studios (Nashville, TN); A Studios (Los Angeles, CA); Vox Recording Studios (Los Angeles, CA); Milkboy the Studio (Philadelphia, PA)
- Genre: Soul; rock; gospel
- Length: 3:22
- Label: Atlantic
- Songwriters: Nick Ruth; Amy Kuney; Molly Kate Kestner
- Producer: Nick Ruth

"Move You" is a song by American singer Kelly Clarkson, from her eighth studio album, Meaning of Life (2017). It was produced by Nick Ruth, who had written it with Molly Kate Kestner and Amy Kuney. A soul rock power ballad, it was released by Atlantic Records as a promotional single from the album on September 7, 2017.

== Composition ==
"Move You" was produced by Nick Ruth, who had written it with Molly Kate Kestner and Amy Kuney. Even though Clarkson was listed as a co-writer by several media outlets, she later clarified that she was not a part of the writing process. It is a soulful gospel ballad with a powerful drum-string combination. Jon Blistein of Rolling Stone noted that Clarkson's vocals carries the song to a rapturous peak before descending gracefully, while Forbes's Hugh McIntyre opined that the song chucks the ideas of structure and goes straight for the heart, Thematically, Joe-Marie Mckenzie of ABC News described its atmosphere as "dark", while McIntyre remarked that the ideas represented by the song may end up being stronger than the final musical product itself, though he also added that the singer's massive vocals won't let even that imagery steal the show entirely. Lyrically, it sings of wanting to have an incredible impact on another person.

== Release and reception ==
"Move You" was issued by Atlantic Records as a promotional single from Meaning of Life on September 7, 2017. Upon its release, Idolator's Mike Wass remarked that the song is more traditional than its companion track and will "no doubt, appeal to old fans and newcomers alike." In his review for Forbes, McIntyre wrote that if there is only one song released this year from a major star that will conjure tears, it has arrived.

== Live performances ==
Clarkson presented "Move You" in an intimate live performance at the Rainbow Room in New York City on September 6, 2017. She premiered the song live on The Today Show on September 8, 2017, followed by a reprise on the television special EIF Presents: XQ Super School Live the same evening.

== Track listing ==
Digital download – South Korea
No.	Title	Length
1.	"Love So Soft"	2:52
2.	"Move You"	3:22

== Charts ==
Chart (2017)	Peak position
UK Download (Official Charts Company)	181
US Digital Songs (Billboard)	58

== Release history ==
List of releases, showing region, date, format, record label, and catalog number
Region	Date	Format	Label	Catalog number	Ref.
Various	September 7, 2017	Digital download; streaming	Atlantic	USAT21703570	
