= Issues 101 =

2002 film by John Lincoln

- Theatrical release poster
- Directed by: John Lincoln
- Written by: John Lincoln
- Produced by: John Lincoln; Kenneth Schuyler
- Starring: Kelly Clarkson
- Cinematography: Kenneth Schuyler
- Edited by: Gabrielle Grant
- Music by: Rudy Matthews
- Distributed by: Triangle Pillar Group; Ariztical Entertainment
- Release date: August 11, 2002
- Running time: 90 minutes
- Country: United States
- Budget: US$75,000 (estimated)

Issues 101 is a 2002 American independent romantic drama film released in 2002. Issues 101 played at gay and lesbian film festivals throughout 2002 and 2003. This film was the debut of pop rock singer Grammy-winner Kelly Clarkson as an actress.

== Synopsis ==
Joe comes out and goes to a Southern Californian college. He begins to mix with the students and the Greek fraternal community. He finds himself one-third of a love triangle with two other guys, one gay and the other "straight with issues." This relationship is put to the test, when he decides to run for student body president.

== Cast ==
- Michael Rozman as Joe Phillips
- Dennis W. Rittenhouse Jr. as Christian
- Jeff Sublett as Michael
- Jason Boegh as Steve Radberry
- Yolanda Johnston as Kim
- Jeremy Smith as Todd
- Gary Castro Churchwell as Bill (fraternity president)
- Trevor Murphy as Tim
- Kelly Clarkson as Crystal
- Larissa Kern as Lisa Lindbert
- Chris Benson as Justin
- Brian Swinehart as Bo
- Dan Callaway as Jeff
- Michael Haboush as Nick
- Brad Murphy as Scott- Pi Pi Rho pres

== Controversy ==
The film attracted a formal complaint by a viewer to the New Zealand Broadcast Standards Authority after it aired during the Triangle Television gay television festival in Auckland in January 2003. The BSA on June 5, 2003, ruled that the scenes depicting oral and anal sex were offensive and the timeslot of its broadcast (8.30 pm) was unsuitable for children.

== Home media ==
Issues 101 was released on Region 1 DVD on April 13, 2004.

== Reception ==
Jay Nixon on behalf of 'Super Reviewer' gave the film a score ½ and said "Bad acting and rock bottom production values".
