= Kelly Clarkson =

American singer-songwriter and TV personality (born 1982)

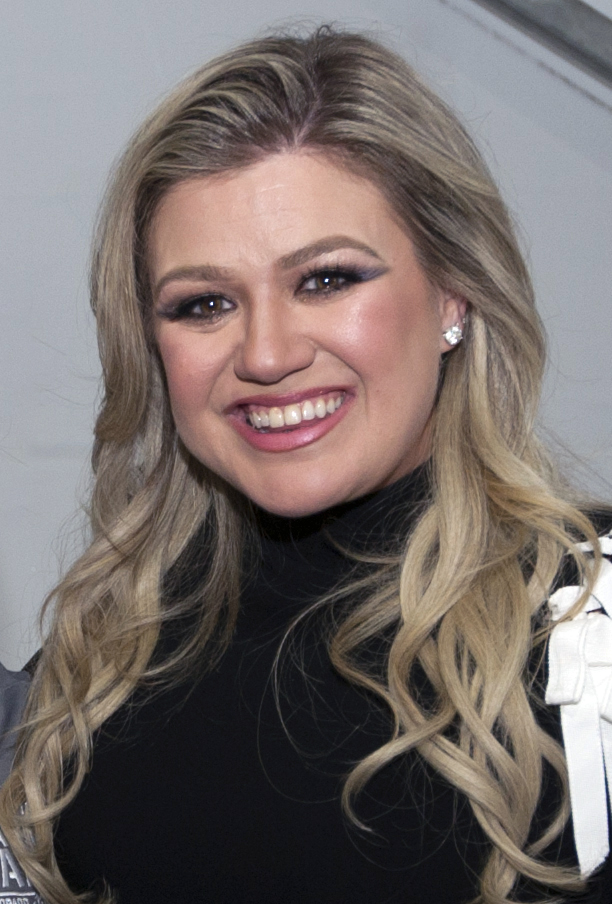
- Clarkson in 2018
- Born: Kelly Brianne Clarkson; April 24, 1982 (age 44); Fort Worth, Texas, U.S.
- Other name: Kelly Blackstock
- Occupations: Singer; songwriter; television personality
- Years active: 2002–present
- Spouse: Brandon Blackstock (m. 2013; div. 2022)
- Children: 2
- Awards: Full list
- Musical career
- Genres: Pop; pop rock
- Instruments: Vocals
- Labels: RCA; 19; S; Atlantic; High Road
- Website: kellyclarkson.com

Signature
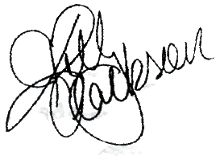

Kelly Brianne (Note: In February 2022, she removed her Clarkson surname from her legal name for personal reasons. She continues to use the professional name Kelly Clarkson.) (born Kelly Brianne Clarkson, April 24, 1982), known professionally as Kelly Clarkson, is an American singer, songwriter, and television personality. Rising to fame after winning the first season of American Idol, she has established a multi-decade career in music and television and is credited with having a lasting impact on televised talent shows. Known as a vocal powerhouse and versatile performer, she was ranked one of the 200 Greatest Singers of All Time by Rolling Stone.

Signed to RCA Records in 2002, Clarkson released her chart-topping debut single, "A Moment Like This", which became the best-selling single of the year in the US. Her R&B and gospel-influenced debut album, Thankful (2003), entered the US Billboard 200 at number one. Clarkson shifted genres to pop rock for Breakaway (2004), one of the best-selling albums of the 21st century. Its singles "Since U Been Gone" and "Behind These Hazel Eyes" were among the top ten charted songs of 2005 in the US, while "Because of You" topped the charts in Europe. After the lukewarm reception to My December (2007), with its darker rock music, Clarkson returned to radio-friendly pop rock sounds with All I Ever Wanted (2009) and Stronger (2011), which respectively produced the number-one singles "My Life Would Suck Without You" and "Stronger (What Doesn't Kill You)".

Clarkson ventured into Christmas music with Wrapped in Red (2013), which became the best-selling holiday album of the year and featured "Underneath the Tree", American Society of Composers, Authors and Publishers (ASCAP)'s most popular Christmas song released in the 21st century. Following the release of the number-one album Piece by Piece (2015), she signed with Atlantic Records and recorded three further albums titled Meaning of Life (2017), When Christmas Comes Around... (2021), and Chemistry (2023), with the latter serving as her final release on a major label. Clarkson returned to television as a coach on The Voice for eleven seasons between 2018 and 2026. She remains the female coach with the most winning contestants (four) in the show's history. From 2019 to 2026, she hosted her own talk show, The Kelly Clarkson Show.

With over 82 million records sold worldwide, Clarkson is one of the world's best-selling music artists. She has received various accolades, including three Grammy Awards, three MTV Video Music Awards, four American Music Awards, nine Daytime Emmy Awards, and a star on the Hollywood Walk of Fame. Billboard ranked her as the Top Female Artist of 2005 and the 11th most successful female artist of the 21st century. Clarkson's first seven studio albums generated a total of 12 top-ten hits on the US Billboard Hot 100 chart between 2002 and 2024, as well as 10 top-ten singles in the UK, Canada, and Australia. Having a crossover appeal on various radio formats, she became the first act in history to top each of Billboard's pop, adult contemporary, country, and dance airplay charts. VH1 ranked her nineteenth on their list of the 100 Greatest Women in Music.

== Early life ==
Kelly Brianne Clarkson was born on April 24, 1982, in Fort Worth, Texas, to Jeanne Ann (née Rose), a first-grade English teacher, and Stephen Michael Clarkson (1951–2018), a former engineer. She has two older siblings: Jason and Alyssa. The three have two younger half-brothers from their father's second marriage. Stephen and Jeanne divorced when Clarkson was six years old, where upon her brother went to live with their father, her sister went to live with an aunt, and she stayed with their mother. Clarkson's mother later married Jimmy Taylor. Clarkson is of English, Welsh, Irish, and Greek descent. Jeanne is a descendant of Republican state senator Isaiah Rose (Rose's background was discussed on Clarkson's episode of Who Do You Think You Are? in 2013). Clarkson was raised Southern Baptist. She has said, "I always grew up in church. I was the leader of our youth group. I've always grown up pretty close to church and with God. But I think I've just gotten a lot closer just because He's the only one I can lean on." She later said of her upbringing, "My family was highly conservative; I had to go to church on Sunday and Wednesday."

Clarkson grew up in Burleson, Texas, and was educated at Pauline Hughes Middle School. In the seventh grade, the school's choir teacher, Cynthia Glenn, overheard her singing in a hallway and asked her to audition for the school choir. Clarkson told her she had never received any professional vocal training. Clarkson graduated from Burleson High School in 2000, where she performed in several musicals, such as Annie Get Your Gun, Seven Brides for Seven Brothers, and Brigadoon. Clarkson started voice training, hoping to secure a college scholarship in music.

After graduating from high school, Clarkson declined full scholarships to the University of Texas at Austin, University of North Texas, and Berklee College of Music. She later mentioned "I'd already written so much music and wanted to try on my own... I figured you're never too old to go to college." She worked several jobs to finance a demo, recording material and trying to market it to record labels, but she received little response. Clarkson turned down two recording contracts from Jive Records and Interscope Records, saying, "They would have completely pigeonholed me as a bubblegum act. I was confident enough that something better would come along." In 2001, she traveled to Los Angeles, pursuing a career in music. She appeared as an extra in a few television series such as Sabrina, the Teenage Witch and Dharma & Greg, and briefly worked with musician Gerry Goffin to record five demo tracks in an effort to secure a record deal. According to Clarkson, her early attempts to launch her music career floundered when she was turned down by almost every U.S. record label for sounding "too black". Lack of other career opportunities and a fire incident in her apartment forced Clarkson to return to Burleson, where she worked different jobs.

== Career ==
=== 2002–2003: American Idol, World Idol, and Thankful ===
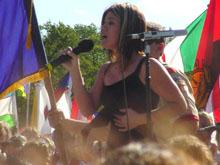
Clarkson at the Lincoln Memorial in Washington, D.C., on September 11, 2002, after her win on Idol.

Upon returning to Burleson, Clarkson was encouraged by her friends to audition for the first season of the reality television series American Idol: The Search for a Superstar in May 2002. Despite receiving a "golden ticket", a pass to the Hollywood rounds, in the series premiere, Clarkson made her first appearance during the second episode. In an interview in 2012, Clarkson referred to the first season as "ghetto", explaining: "On our season we were like kids in camp. Nobody knew what to do. The show was ever changing every day. They did one season of Pop Idol in the UK, but America is a very different market. They dropped us off in a mall and said 'find some clothes to wear on national television'. I am maybe the closest to white trash you can get. What do I buy? White pants I guess? I definitely looked like a cocktail waitress." Clarkson went on to win the competition on September 4, 2002, at the Kodak Theatre (Dolby Theatre), earning 58% of the votes against runner-up Justin Guarini.

Immediately after winning American Idol, Clarkson was signed to a record deal with RCA Records, 19 Recordings, and S Records by talent manager Simon Fuller, who created American Idol, and music mogul Clive Davis, who was slated to executive-produce her debut album. On September 17, 2002, her debut double-A-side single, "Before Your Love"/"A Moment Like This", was released. Both songs were performed by Clarkson during the season finale of American Idol. After debuting at number 60 on the Billboard Hot 100 chart, the single climbed to number 52 the following week, and subsequently ascended to number one. It broke a 38-year-old record set by the British band The Beatles for the biggest leap to number one. It eventually went on to become the best-selling single of 2002 in the United States.

American Idol season 1 performances and results
Week #	Theme	Song choice	Original artist	Order #	Result
Audition	Dallas	"Express Yourself" "At Last"	Madonna; Glenn Miller and His Orchestra	N/A	Advanced
Top 121	Hollywood Round 1	"Respect"	Otis Redding	N/A	Advanced
Top 65	Hollywood Round 2	"I Say a Little Prayer"	Dionne Warwick	N/A	Advanced
Top 45	Hollywood Round 3	"Save the Best for Last"	Vanessa Williams	N/A	Advanced
Top 30	Semifinal/Group 2	"Respect"	Otis Redding	9	Advanced
Top 10	Motown	"You're All I Need to Get By"	Marvin Gaye and Tammi Terrell	8	Safe
Top 8	1960s	"(You Make Me Feel Like) A Natural Woman"	Aretha Franklin	5	Safe
Top 7	1970s	"Don't Play That Song (You Lied)"	Ben E. King	5	Safe
Top 6	Big Band	"Stuff Like That There"	Betty Hutton	6	Safe
Top 5	Burt Bacharach Love Songs	"Walk On By"	Dionne Warwick	1	Safe
Top 4	1980s 1990s	"It's Raining Men" "I Surrender"	The Weather Girls; Celine Dion	3; 7	Safe
Top 3	Idol's Choice; Judges' Choice	"Think Twice" "Without You"	Celine Dion; Badfinger	3; 6	Safe
Top 2	Finale	"A Moment Like This" "Respect" "Before Your Love"	Kelly Clarkson; Otis Redding; Kelly Clarkson	2; 4; 6	Winner

Clarkson's debut album, Thankful, was released on April 15, 2003. The album contained aspects of pop, contemporary R&B, and gospel music, with several established musicians such as Rhett Lawrence, Diane Warren, The Underdogs, and Babyface contributing on to the tracks. Released during a time of urban-R&B dominance, the album was well received by several critics. AllMusic critic Stephen Thomas Erlewine praised the album for its vocal ability: "throughout this record, (Clarkson) makes it seem effortless and charming. She can croon, she can belt out a song, she can be sexy and sassy while still being graceful and as wholesome as the girl next door." Henry Goldblatt of Entertainment Weekly remarked: "Clarkson glides through octaves with the masterful control of someone who's been doing this for decades." Thankful was a commercial success, debuting at number one on the Billboard 200 chart and went on to sell over 4.5 million copies worldwide. It was later certified double platinum by the RIAA, platinum in Canada, and gold in Japan and Australia. Billboard ranked Clarkson 10th in their Top Pop Artist (female) list of 2003.

Its lead single, "Miss Independent", became her first international hit, reaching the top ten in five national charts, including the US. It was later certified gold by the RIAA. It earned Clarkson her first Grammy Award nomination for "Best Female Pop Vocal Performance" at the 46th Grammy Awards. It was followed with two moderately successful singles, "Low" and "The Trouble with Love Is"; the latter was used on the soundtrack of British romantic film Love Actually. Her first video album, Miss Independent, was released on November 18, 2003, and was certified gold by the RIAA. To support Thankful, Clarkson and Idol second season runner-up Clay Aiken co-headlined the 2004 Independent Tour throughout the US.

Clarkson made her film debut with Guarini with the release of the musical romantic comedy film From Justin to Kelly in June 2003. The film was poorly received by critics and was unsuccessful at the box office, with Clarkson explaining that she was "contractually obligated" to do the film and didn't like it. In 2002, Clarkson, along with American Idol judges Paula Abdul and Randy Jackson and hosts Brian Dunkleman and Ryan Seacrest, participated in the season premiere of the eighth season of the television sketch comedy series Mad TV. She also portrayed Brenda Lee in two episodes of the television drama American Dreams between 2003 and 2004. On December 25, 2003, Clarkson participated in the television special competition World Idol in London, along with the first winners of the several Idol television series around the world. Clarkson was contractually obligated to participate, and she performed Aretha Franklin's "(You Make Me Feel Like) A Natural Woman". She ended up as the runner-up with 97 points, behind the first Norwegian Idol Kurt Nilsen.

=== 2004–2006: New management and Breakaway ===
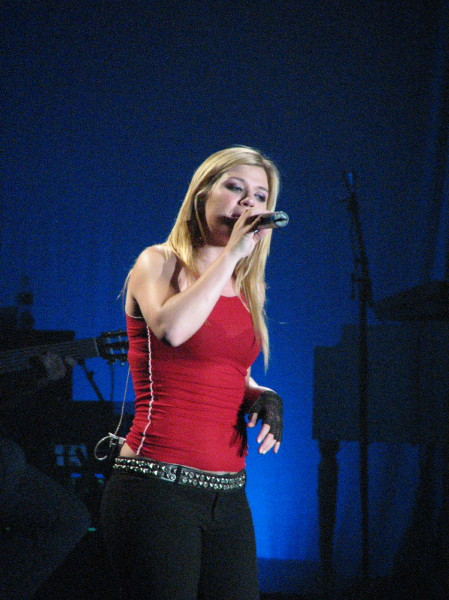
Clarkson performing while on her Breakaway World Tour on November 15, 2005, Canberra, Australia

Trying to distance herself from her American Idol image, Clarkson decided to leave Fuller and 19 Management and hired the services of talent manager Jeff Kwatinetz of The Firm. She reinvented herself to some extent, developing a more rock-oriented sound with her second studio album, Breakaway. Davis served as the executive producer for the record, while Clarkson co-wrote six of the tracks with pop and rock songwriters such as former Evanescence band members Ben Moody and David Hodges, Kara DioGuardi, Dr. Luke and Max Martin. Breakaway received critical acclaim, with Erlewine of AllMusic remarking: "What gives Breakaway its spine are the driving, anthemic pop tunes, numbers that sound simultaneously mainstream and youthful, which is a hard trick to pull off, and they are the tracks that illustrate Clarkson is a rare thing in the 2000s: a pop singer who's neither hip nor square, just solidly and enjoyably in the mainstream."

Breakaway was released on November 30, 2004, and became Clarkson's most commercially successful album. After debuting at number three on the Billboard 200, its longevity allowed it to become the third-best-selling album of 2005 in the US and was certified sextuple platinum by the RIAA. The album also enjoyed success throughout the world; it topped the charts in the Netherlands and Ireland, became the world's seventh-best-selling album of 2005 and went on to sell more than twelve million copies worldwide. Clarkson was named the Top Female Artist of the Year by Billboard. She promoted the album with the Breakaway Tour, Hazel Eyes Tour, and Addicted Tour which took place from 2005 to 2006.

Five singles were released to promote Breakaway. Its title track, "Breakaway", was originally released in July 2004, as the soundtrack for Disney film The Princess Diaries 2: Royal Engagement and was later re-released as the album's fifth single in May 2006. It became Clarkson's third top-ten single on the Billboard Hot 100 with a peak of number six. It was a major success on adult contemporary radio, topping the Billboard Adult Contemporary for 21 weeks and the Adult Contemporary Audience chart for 28 weeks (her longest number one on any charts). "Since U Been Gone" was released as the album's lead single in November 2004 and became Clarkson's most successful single on the Hot 100 despite peaking at number two. The second and third singles, "Behind These Hazel Eyes" and "Because of You", also followed suit—peaking at number six and number seven on the Hot 100, respectively. "Because of You" became Clarkson's biggest single worldwide, reaching number one on the European Hot 100 Singles chart and the national charts in Brazil, the Netherlands, Denmark, and Switzerland. The fourth single, "Walk Away", peaked at number twelve on the Hot 100. According to Mediabase, Clarkson was the most-played artist of 2006 in the U.S.

Breakaway garnered Clarkson many accolades, including two trophies at the 48th Grammy Awards—the Best Female Pop Vocal Performance for "Since U Been Gone" and the Best Pop Vocal Album. She also won Best Female Video two years in a row, for "Since U Been Gone" and "Because of You", at the MTV Video Music Awards. Clarkson's second video album, Behind Hazel Eyes, was released on March 29, 2005. In 2005, she performed and participated during the thirtieth season of the American sketch-comedy series, Saturday Night Live, and the reality series Damage Control with Simple Plan frontman Pierre Bouvier. She performed "The Star-Spangled Banner" at Game 2 of the NBA Finals. She performed during the festivities All-Star Game and the 2006 Winter Olympics in Torino, Italy; In 2006, Clarkson recorded "Go" as a free download for the Ford Motor Company advertising campaign.

=== 2007–2009: My December and All I Ever Wanted ===
Clarkson's third studio album, My December, was released on June 22, 2007. The album relied on darker themes and heavier rock music. She replaced Davis as the executive producer and co-wrote all the tracks. She opted to collaborate with her band members rather than her previous producers and collaborators. Its production and release became a subject of a dispute with RCA, particularly with Davis. He noted the album's lack of professional production input and wanted her to re-record tracks with a more mainstream appeal, which she refused. Clarkson defended herself saying, "I've sold more than 15 million records worldwide, and still nobody listens to what I have to say. I couldn't give a crap about being a star. I've always just wanted to sing and write." The album received positive response, but lack of promotion due to reluctance of RCA led Clarkson to dismiss Kwatinetz and Live Nation to cancel its accompanying tour, the My December Tour, and reschedule it into a smaller scale with supporting acts Jon McLaughlin, Sean Kingston and Mandy Moore. Clarkson later hired talent manager Narvel Blackstock of Starstruck Management. Blackstock was the husband of country artist Reba McEntire, of whom Clarkson is a close friend. Clarkson later issued an apology to Davis, citing him as "a key advisor" in her success.

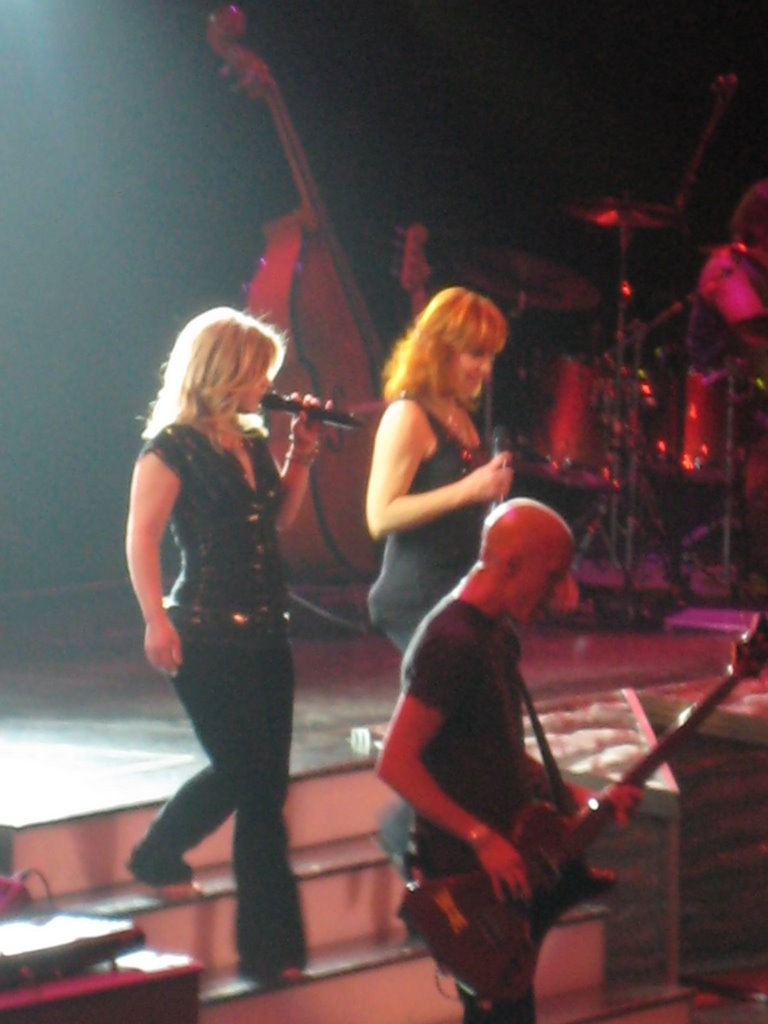
Clarkson and Reba McEntire during the 2 Worlds 2 Voices Tour in Minneapolis in 2008

My December debuted at number two on the Billboard 200 chart and was certified platinum by the RIAA. The album went on to sell over 2.5 million copies worldwide. It featured only one major hit single, "Never Again", which debuted and peaked at number eight on the Billboard Hot 100—her highest debut on the chart ever. On July 7, 2007, Clarkson performed on the American leg of Live Earth concert. Clarkson partnered with NASCAR during their 2007 season, appearing in televised advertisements, performed at pre-race concerts, promoted NASCAR Day, and appeared at the Champions' Banquet in December.

Clarkson collaborated with Reba McEntire in an hour-long CMT Crossroads special at Nashville's Ryman Auditorium on February 22, 2007. Introduced by Dolly Parton, Clarkson performed "Why Haven't I Heard from You" and "Does He Love You" with Martina McBride on the television special CMT Giants: Reba McEntire. She also appeared on an episode of McEntire's sitcom Reba, which aired on January 14, 2007. At the Academy of Country Music Awards on May 16, 2007, Clarkson and McEntire sang a country version of "Because of You", which also became the lead single from the album Reba: Duets. It peaked at number two on the Billboard Hot Country Songs chart and was nominated for a Grammy Award for Best Country Collaboration with Vocals. Throughout 2008, Clarkson and McEntire embarked on the 2 Worlds 2 Voices Tour to support Reba: Duets and My December.

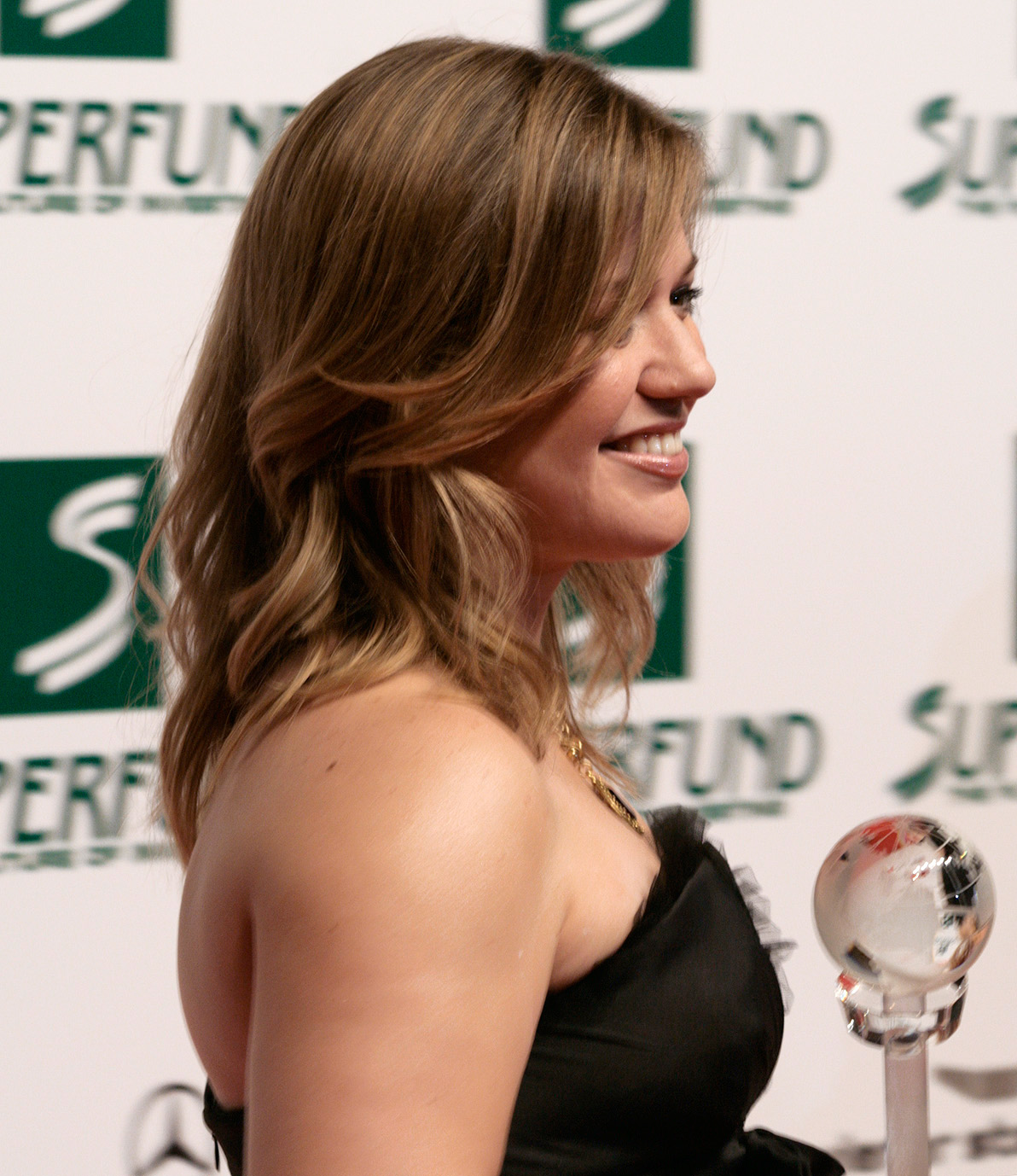
Clarkson at the Women's World Awards 2009 in Vienna

Clarkson's fourth album, All I Ever Wanted, was released on March 6, 2009. Clarkson continued to co-write her own material, but this time she returned to a mainstream-oriented sound by reuniting with previous collaborators Dr. Luke, Martin, and DioGuardi, and new collaborators Howard Benson, Claude Kelly, Ryan Tedder, Glen Ballard, Matt Thiessen and Katy Perry in contributing tracks for the album. The release of All I Ever Wanted was met with positive acclaim from music critics for its lighter themes. The album was a commercial success, debuting at number one on the Billboard 200 and remaining there for two weeks. The album has sold over a million copies in the U.S. and garnered Clarkson a nomination for Best Pop Vocal Album at the 52nd Grammy Awards.

Its first single, "My Life Would Suck Without You", became an international hit. It entered the Billboard Hot 100 at number 97 and rose to the top position the following week, breaking the record for the biggest jump to number one in a single week previously held by Britney Spears' "Womanizer". It also topped the charts in the United Kingdom, Canada, and Hungary. It was followed with two more top-twenty singles, "I Do Not Hook Up" and "Already Gone". The release of "Already Gone" became a subject of another dispute between Clarkson and RCA, after she realized its similarities with Beyoncé's song "Halo", both of which were produced by Tedder. Further promotion for the album was abruptly ended with the limited success of its fourth and final singles, "All I Ever Wanted" and "Cry". Clarkson supported All I Ever Wanted with the All I Ever Wanted Tour from 2009 to 2010. She also performed as one of many main artists for the return of VH1 Divas in September 2009. Clarkson became a guest mentor on the Dutch television series X Factor in November 2009.

=== 2010–2012: Stronger, Duets, and Greatest Hits – Chapter One ===
Clarkson recorded a country duet with Jason Aldean, "Don't You Wanna Stay", for his 2010 album My Kinda Party. It became her first number-one song on the Billboard Hot Country Songs chart and has sold over 2.7 million copies, making it the best-selling country collaboration in history. It received numerous country-related accolades, including a nomination for a Grammy Award for Best Country Duo/Group Performance at the 54th Grammy Awards. Clarkson incorporated a slight country vibe into her fifth studio album, Stronger, which was also influenced by Prince, Tina Turner, Sheryl Crow, and Radiohead. She worked with several producers including Greg Kurstin, Ester Dean, Darkchild, Toby Gad, Steve Jordan, and Howard Benson. Released on October 21, 2011, Stronger debuted at number two on the Billboard 200 and was certified platinum by the RIAA. It was also critically applauded and won the Grammy Award for Best Pop Vocal Album at the 2013 Grammy Awards, making her the first artist to win the award twice.

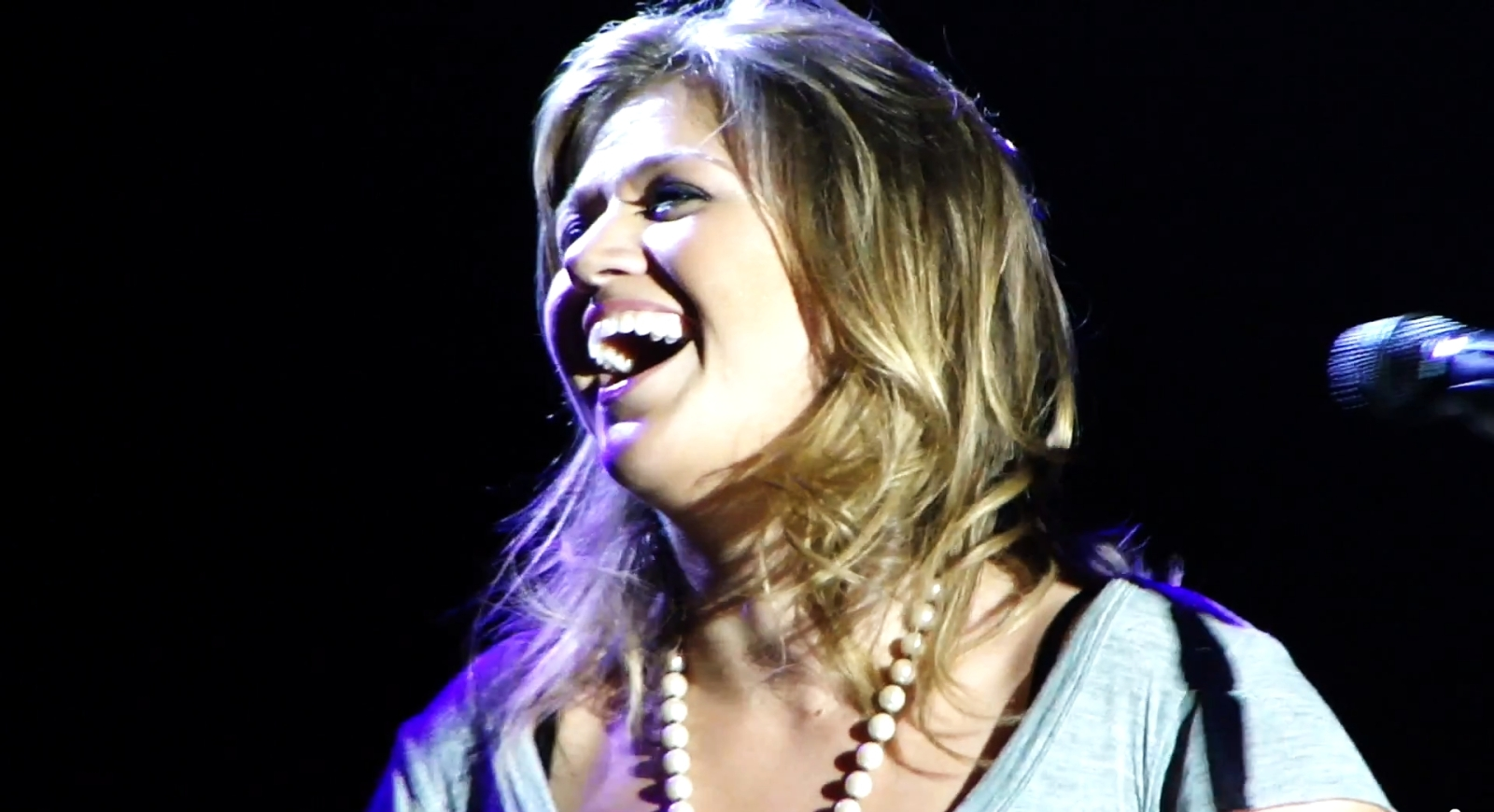
Clarkson performing in Sudbury, Canada in 2011

Stronger's lead single, "Mr. Know It All", was released in September 2011. It reached number one in Australia and South Korea and attained a top-ten position in seven countries, including the U.S., where it became her ninth top-ten hit on the Billboard Hot 100 chart. It also became a crossover hit to the country charts, prompting RCA to reissue a country version. "Stronger (What Doesn't Kill You)" served as the second single in January 2012, and topped sixteen Billboard charts, becoming her third number one on the Hot 100. It also reached number one in Poland and Slovakia and reached the top ten in many other charts worldwide. It remains Clarkson's best-selling single, with 4.9 million copies sold in the U.S. alone. The song was nominated for three Grammy Awards—Record of the Year, Song of the Year, and Best Pop Solo Performance. "Dark Side" was released as the third and final single in June 2012, and it achieved a modest success. It became her eleventh top-ten hit on the Billboard Adult Pop Songs chart, and she surpassed Sheryl Crow and Katy Perry as the female artist with the most top-ten songs on the chart.

The release of Stronger was accompanied by two EPs, The Smoakstack Sessions and iTunes Session. The latter debuted at number 85 on the Billboard 200, and it was promoted by its only single, a cover of "I'll Be Home for Christmas". Clarkson co-wrote "Tell Me a Lie", which was recorded by British boy band One Direction for their debut album, Up All Night (2011). Clarkson promoted Stronger with two concert tours, the Stronger Tour and the co-headlining the Kelly Clarkson / The Fray Tour with the alternative rock band The Fray. On February 5, 2012, she performed "The Star-Spangled Banner" at Super Bowl XLVI to widespread critical acclaim. She later released a promotional single, "Get Up (A Cowboys Anthem)", for use in Pepsi's NFL advertising campaign.

Clarkson served as a mentor and judge, alongside John Legend, Jennifer Nettles, and Robin Thicke, on the ABC television show Duets, which premiered on May 24, 2012. The show concluded on July 19, 2012, with Clarkson's contestant Jason Farol finishing as the second runner-up. She also became a guest mentor to Blake Shelton's team on the second season of The Voice. The two later collaborated on a cover of "There's a New Kid in Town" for Shelton's 2012 Christmas album, Cheers, It's Christmas.

Commemorating the 10th anniversary of her career in music, Clarkson released her first greatest hits album, Greatest Hits – Chapter One, on November 19, 2012. Three new songs were recorded for the compilation—"Catch My Breath", "Don't Rush" (featuring country musician Vince Gill) and "People Like Us"—were all released as singles. "Catch My Breath" became her 14th top-twenty hit on the Hot 100 chart as well as her 13th million-selling single in the United States. According to Billboard, it was the third biggest adult contemporary song of 2013. However, its follow-up singles performed moderately well on the charts. Clarkson earned more nominations from the country music industry, including Best Country Duo/Group Performance for "Don't Rush" at the 56th Annual Grammy Awards and Female Vocalist of the Year at the 2012 Country Music Association Awards. Chapter One was eventually certified gold in Australia, the UK and the U.S.

=== 2013–2015: Wrapped in Red and Piece by Piece ===
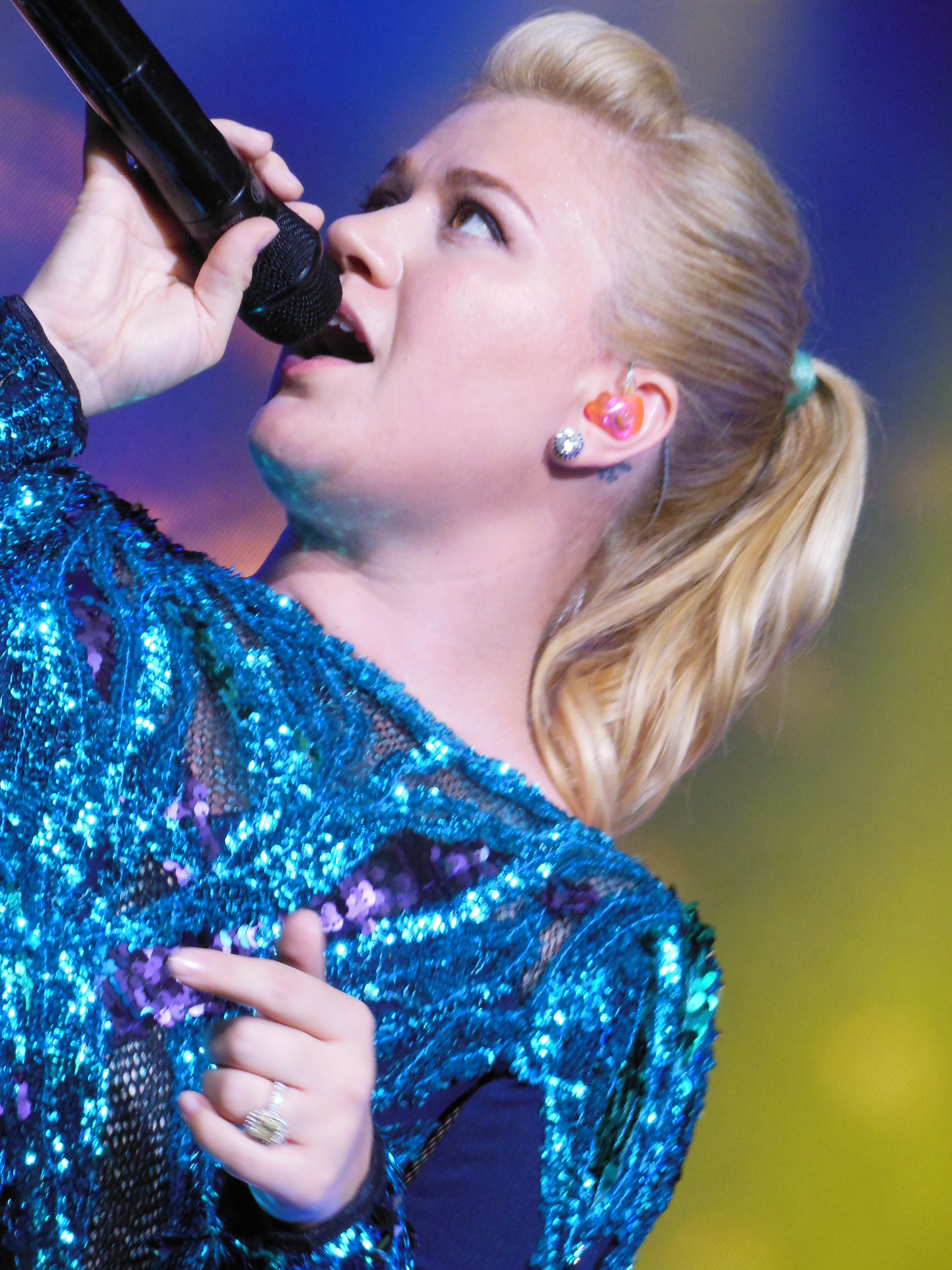
Clarkson performing at the 12th Annual Honda Civic Tour in August 2013

In January 2013, Clarkson performed "My Country, 'Tis of Thee" at the second inauguration of U.S. President Barack Obama. Her live rendition was acclaimed by critics, who contrasted it with Beyoncé's pre-recorded performance during the same event. In February 2013, she performed "Tennessee Waltz" and "(You Make Me Feel Like) A Natural Woman" at the 55th Annual Grammy Awards as a tribute to Patti Page and Carole King. She also released a non-album single, "Tie It Up", exclusively to country music stations in June 2013. Clarkson and Maroon 5 performed at 24 concerts as part of the 12th Annual Honda Civic Tour, starting on August 1, 2013, and ending on October 6, 2013. She was featured on the re-recorded version of "Foolish Games" for Jewel's first compilation, Greatest Hits (2013). Clarkson also collaborated with singer Robbie Williams on the song "Little Green Apples" for his 2013 album Swings Both Ways.

Clarkson's sixth studio album and first Christmas record, Wrapped in Red, was solely produced by Greg Kurstin. She co-wrote all five original songs and recorded eleven cover versions of Christmas standards and carols. Released on October 25, 2013, the album debuted at number one on the Billboard Top Holiday Albums and at number three on the Billboard 200 chart. By December 2013, Wrapped in Red had already been certified platinum by the RIAA and eventually became the best-selling holiday album of the year. The album's lead single, "Underneath the Tree", was an adult contemporary number-one hit in both the U.S. and Canada. Clarkson subsequently became Billboard's ninth top adult contemporary act of 2013. On December 11, 2013, her first Christmas special debut, Kelly Clarkson's Cautionary Christmas Music Tale, garnered over 5.3 million viewers. In December 2013, Citizen Watch Co. announced Clarkson as their newest Brand Ambassador. Retaining her relationship with country music acts in 2014, Clarkson collaborated with Martina McBride on "In the Basement" (originally by Etta James and Sugar Pie DeSanto) for McBride's album Everlasting and with Trisha Yearwood on "PrizeFighter" for Yearwood's compilation PrizeFighter: Hit After Hit. Clarkson also performed a rendition of "All I Ask of You" with Josh Groban on his seventh studio album, Stages, and its companion television special. She was featured on Ben Haenow's "Second Hand Heart", the lead single from his debut studio album.

In February 2015, Clarkson released Piece by Piece, her seventh and final studio album under her recording contract with RCA Records. Musically, it is an electropop and dance album, featuring collaborations with Kurstin, Jesse Shatkin, Sia, John Legend, and Shane McAnally, among others. Piece by Piece received a reasonably positive response from music critics and became her third album to debut at the top of the Billboard 200 chart. To promote the album, Clarkson appeared in several televised performances, including the fourteenth season of American Idol, where she became the only alumnus ever to be dedicated with a competing week featuring her discography. She also supported the Piece by Piece Tour throughout 2015, which was cut short of its worldwide visits following medical recommendations for a vocal rest during the year.

Piece by Piece spawned three singles. The first one, "Heartbeat Song", peaked at number 21 on the Billboard Hot 100 chart and became a top-ten hit in the UK, Austria, Poland, and South Africa. However, Clarkson failed to achieve a similar success with the second single, "Invincible". The third and final single, "Piece by Piece", debuted and peaked at number eight on the Hot 100 chart, following Clarkson's emotional performance on the fifteenth season of American Idol. It became her eleventh U.S. top-ten hit and matched "Never Again" as her highest debut on the chart. At the 58th Annual Grammy Awards, the album and "Heartbeat Song" were nominated for Best Pop Vocal Album and Best Pop Solo Performance, respectively. At the following year, the title track also received a nomination for Best Pop Solo Performance.

=== 2016–2018: Children's books, Meaning of Life, and The Voice ===
In February 2016, Clarkson signed a book deal with HarperCollins. Her first children's book, River Rose and the Magical Lullaby was released on October 4, 2016. The book features an original lullaby written and performed by Clarkson. On the possibility of writing any more books in the future, Clarkson told Publishers Weekly, "I've got a few ideas – there could be a lullaby for each book. We've got a plethora of stories, and I've already written seven songs, full out, so we'll just have to see which ones might pan out to be a book. But yes, there will definitely be more." The second book featuring River Rose, River Rose and the Magical Christmas, was released on October 24, 2017, and included an original song written and sung by Clarkson, "Christmas Eve".

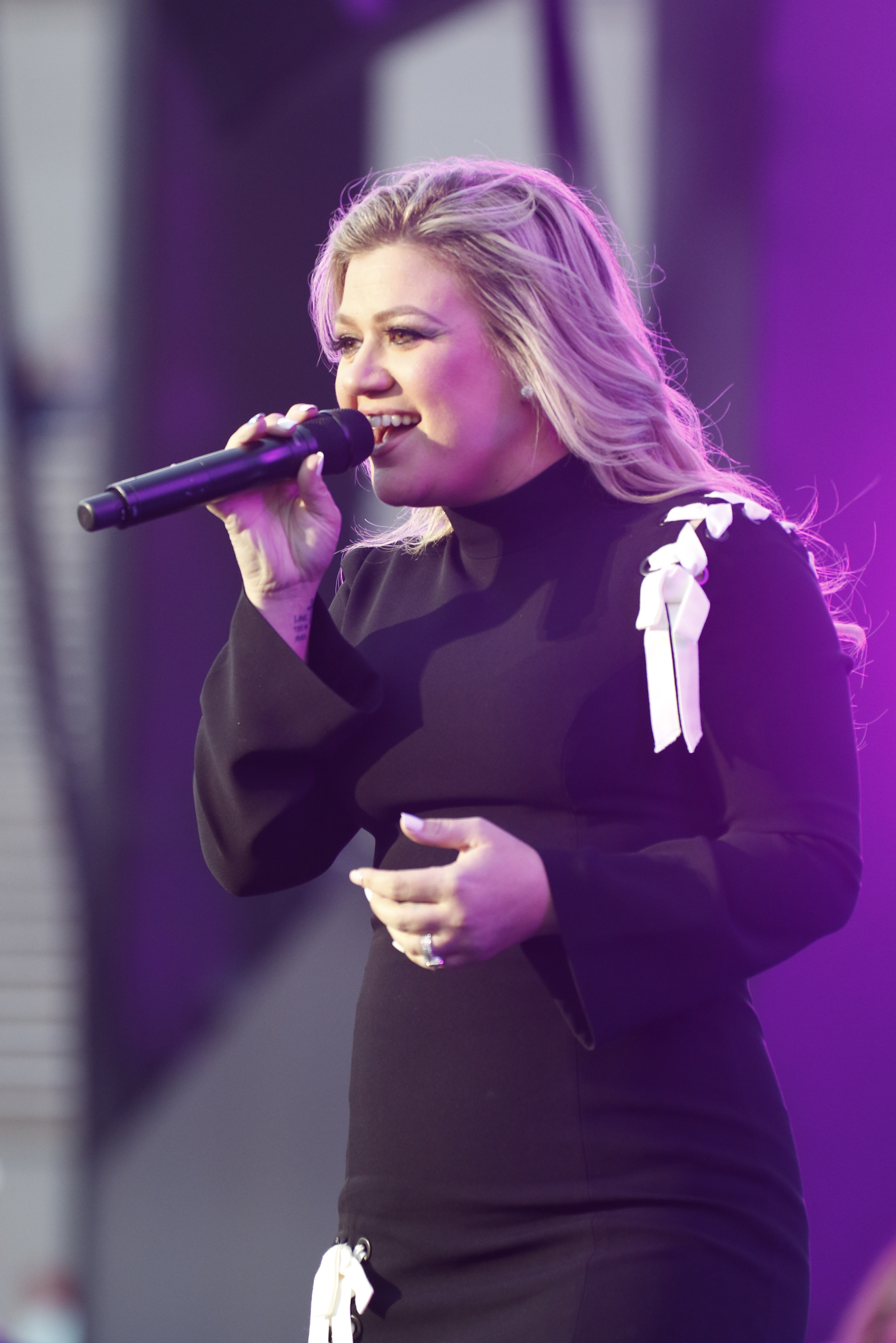
Clarkson performing at the 2018 DoD Warrior Games Opening Ceremony

On March 15, 2016, First Lady Michelle Obama released "This Is for My Girls", a collaborative track featuring vocals from Clarkson, Janelle Monáe, Kelly Rowland, Lea Michele, Zendaya, and Missy Elliott to coincide with Barack Obama's SXSW speech and to promote the First Lady's third-world educational initiative Let Girls Learn. Clarkson recorded a solo version of "It's Quiet Uptown" for The Hamilton Mixtape. Her version was released on November 3, 2016, as a promotional single for the album. She also recorded a duet called "Love Goes On" with Aloe Blacc for the original soundtrack of The Shack, which was released in the United States on March 3, 2017. Clarkson joined The Voice as a coach for the series' fourteenth season.

Clarkson signed a long-term worldwide deal with Atlantic Records, with the intentions of releasing a soul-influenced eighth studio album in 2017. Her lead single "Love So Soft", was released on September 7, 2017, along with the song "Move You". The album, Meaning of Life was released on October 27, 2017. The album went on to debut and peak at number 2 on the Billboard 200 chart, selling 79,000 album-equivalent units. With the release of Meaning of Life, Clarkson revealed that she had discussions with Atlantic Records about the sound of the follow-up record and has expressed interest in venturing deeper into R&B and soulful pop music.

Clarkson opened the 45th American Music Awards with P!nk, and together they performed R.E.M.'s "Everybody Hurts" to honor first responders. Later in the show, she performed "Miss Independent" and "Love So Soft". "Love So Soft" was nominated for Best Pop Solo Performance at the 60th Annual Grammy Awards, giving her the record for the most nominations in that category with four.

Clarkson lent her voice in the animated film The Star, alongside Oprah Winfrey, Steven Yeun, Tyler Perry, and others. The film is based on the Nativity of Jesus. Developed by Sony Pictures Animation, the film was released on November 17, 2017. This was the first film in which Clarkson performed a voice role. Clarkson also had a guest voice role in the Netflix animated series Home: Adventures with Tip & Oh, portraying herself in the series' 2017 animated Christmas special, Home for the Holidays, alongside Ben Schwartz. In March 2018, Clarkson released "I've Loved You Since Forever", a ballad version of the children's book by Hoda Kotb. Clarkson hosted and performed at the 2018 Billboard Music Awards on May 20, 2018. In the fourteenth season of The Voice, Brynn Cartelli was crowned the winner, giving Clarkson her first victory. In the fifteenth season of The Voice, Chevel Shepherd was crowned the winner, giving Clarkson her second consecutive victory and making her the first female coach to win multiple seasons.

=== 2019–2022: The Kelly Clarkson Show and When Christmas Comes Around... ===
Clarkson returned to host the 2019 Billboard Music Awards, which aired on May 1, 2019. Clarkson voiced Moxy and provided original songs in the animated musical comedy film UglyDolls, which was released on May 3, 2019. On March 27, 2019, she released "Broken & Beautiful", the lead single from the UglyDolls: Original Motion Picture Soundtrack. Clarkson also began hosting the daytime variety talk show, The Kelly Clarkson Show, which premiered on September 9, 2019. In December 2019, Jake Hoot was crowned the winner of the seventeenth season of The Voice, giving Clarkson her third victory as a coach in four seasons.

In November 2019, Clarkson's Las Vegas residency, Kelly Clarkson: Invincible was due to take place at the Zappos Theater. It was supposed to run from April to September 2020, but it was postponed indefinitely due to the coronavirus pandemic. Also in November 2019, Clarkson made an appearance on the Apple TV+ drama series The Morning Show as herself, performing her song "Heat" and interacting with the fictional hosts of the show. In February 2020, Clarkson became a brand ambassador for Wayfair. In addition, Wayfair released "an 'exclusive' collection of furniture and decor inspired by Clarkson and her Texan roots." On April 10, 2020, Trolls World Tour, which featured a character voiced by Clarkson, was released. On April 16, 2020, Clarkson released the standalone single "I Dare You" in English, as well as duets in five different languages with five native-speaking artists. In May 2020, The Kelly Clarkson Show earned seven Emmy nominations, the most for any talk show, with Clarkson winning in the category Outstanding Entertainment Talk Show Host.

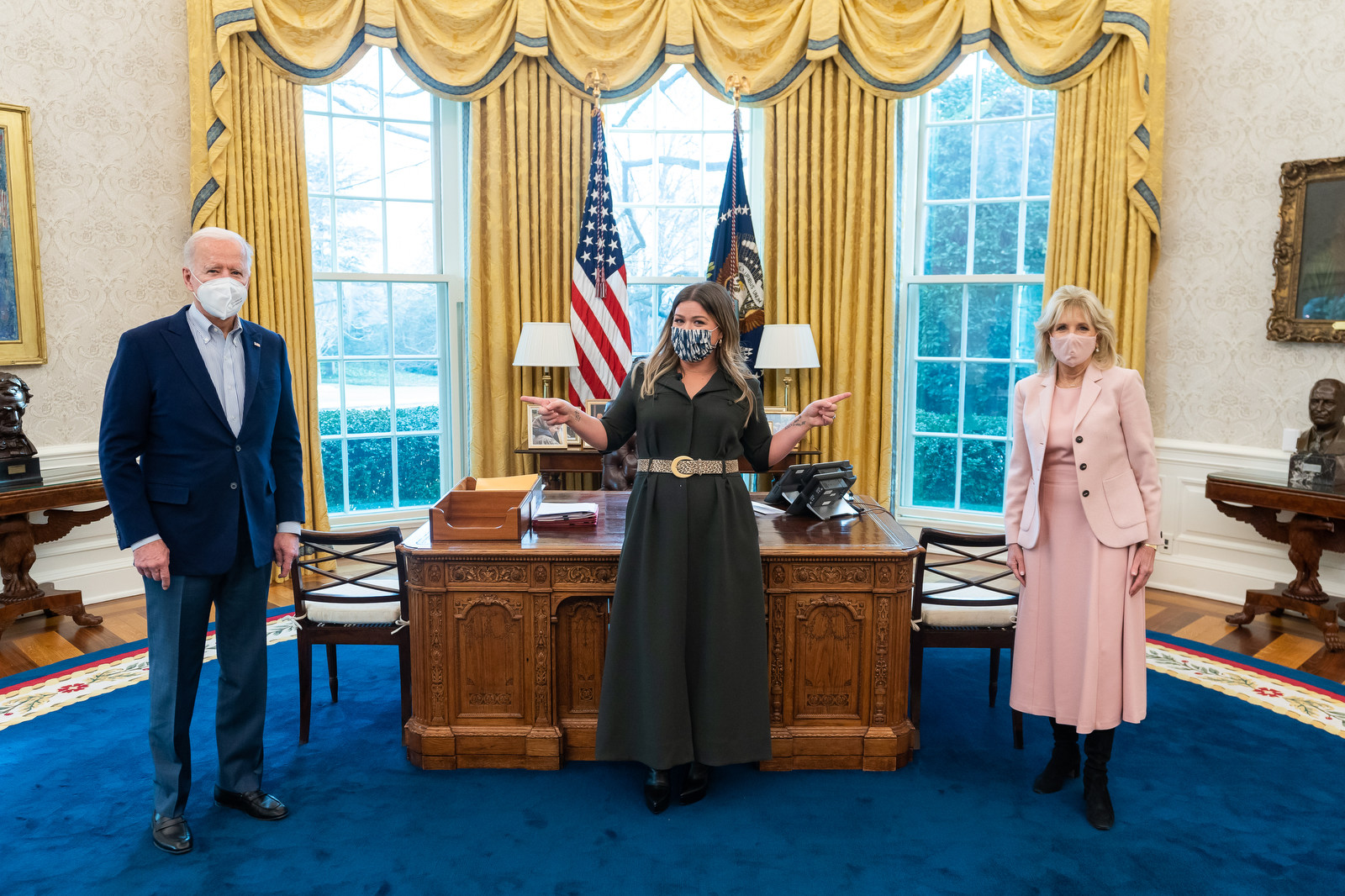
Clarkson with President Joe Biden and First Lady Jill Biden in 2021

In June 2020, she received a star on the Hollywood Walk of Fame in 2021, being inducted into the category of Recording. Clarkson's show would take over the time slot of The Ellen DeGeneres Show after it ends in 2022. In June 2021, Clarkson won two Daytime Emmy Awards, including Outstanding Talk Show Entertainment and a second consecutive win for Outstanding Entertainment Talk Show Host.

On September 23, 2021, Clarkson released "Christmas Isn't Canceled (Just You)", the lead single off her ninth studio album and second Christmas album, When Christmas Comes Around... The album was released on October 15, 2021, to positive reviews and earned Clarkson a nomination for the Grammy Award for Best Traditional Pop Vocal Album. In November 2021, Clarkson performed at the second annual iHeartRadio Holiday Special. She hosted her second Christmas special, Kelly Clarkson Presents: When Christmas Comes Around, which premiered on December 1, 2021. Also in December 2021, Girl Named Tom were crowned winners of the twenty-first season of The Voice. They are the first group act to win an American season & secured Clarkson's final victory as a coach.

In February 2022, Clarkson and Snoop Dogg were named co-hosts of the singing competition series American Song Contest. It is an adaptation of the popular international songwriting competition Eurovision Song Contest. The series premiered on March 21, 2022.

On June 9, 2022, Clarkson released Kellyoke, an EP consisting of six cover songs that Clarkson covered during her "Kellyoke" segment on her talk show. She also revealed that her tenth studio album since was complete. That same month, Clarkson won two Daytime Emmys, including Outstanding Talk Show Entertainment for the second consecutive year and Outstanding Entertainment Talk Show Host for the third consecutive year. Clarkson received a star on the Hollywood Walk of Fame on September 19, 2022. Clarkson appeared on the Kelsea Ballerini song, "You're Drunk, Go Home" along with Carly Pearce, which was released in September 2022.

=== 2023–2024: Chemistry ===
On February 9, 2023, Clarkson hosted the 12th NFL Honors. After taking the twenty-second season of The Voice off, she returned for the twenty-third season in 2023. She covered Cole Porter's "Don't Fence Me In" on Jeff Goldblum and The Mildred Snitzer Orchestra's EP, Play Well with Others released in March 2023.

Her tenth studio album, Chemistry, was released on June 23, 2023. The album's double A-side lead singles, "Mine" and "Me" were released on April 14, 2023. A ten night Las Vegas residency, Chemistry: An Intimate Evening with Kelly Clarkson, ran from July 28 to August 19, 2023, at the Bakkt Theater. Four additional dates were added for December 2023 and February 2024. In October 2023, Clarkson relocated and moved production of The Kelly Clarkson Show from Los Angeles to New York City to start its fifth season. On November 8, 2023, Clarkson launched her own SiriusXM channel, Kelly Clarkson Connection. The channel features Clarkson's own music, music she loves, and music from artists who inspire her. She also tells stories about her own music. On November 10, 2023, Clarkson's studio album Chemistry earned her a sixth nomination for the Grammy Award for Best Pop Vocal Album, making her the most nominated performer in the category. On December 15, 2023, Clarkson won two awards at the delayed 50th Daytime Emmy Awards, including Outstanding Daytime Talk Series and Outstanding Daytime Talk Series Host, and she won another award for Outstanding Daytime Talk Series at the subsequent 51st Daytime Emmy Awards on June 7, 2024.

Clarkson featured on a duet version of James Arthur's song "From the Jump", which was released in April 2024. She is featured on Terri Clark's song "If I Were You", from Clark's 2024 album Take Two. On September 27, 2024, she released "You For Christmas" the lead single from the deluxe reissue of When Christmas Comes Around..., which released on November 1 of the same year. On December 4, 2024, she returned to host and perform on NBC's Christmas in Rockefeller Center for the second year in a row.

=== 2025–present: Independent music and Songs & Stories ===
In January 2025, Clarkson revealed on her talk show she had launched her own record label, with plans to release her own music independently for the first time in her career. Kelly Clarkson: Studio Sessions, an eighteen-date residency at the Colosseum at Caesars Palace took place in Las Vegas. Her new single, "Where Have You Been", permieried on her SiriusXM channel on May 1, 2025, the day before it was released worldwide.

Clarkson returned to The Voice for its twenty-ninth season in February 2026. In August 2025, Clarkson began hosting a new show, Songs & Stories with Kelly Clarkson, which is based on an occasional segment she has on her talk show. The Kelly Clarkson Show ended after its seventh season. Clarkson is featured on the soundtrack on the new Rock 'n' Roller Coaster Starring The Muppets at Disney's Hollywood Studios, with "Walking on Sunshine". On July 17, 2026, Clarkson released a new single "I'd Be Lyin'". She returned for the thirtieth season of The Voice, which began airing in September 2026.

== Artistry ==
=== Voice ===
"Dark Side"
Clarkson displaying her upper soprano range, displaying variations in vibrato as well as her noted dynamic and emotive delivery

"Don't Rush"
Clarkson displaying a softer, breathier timbre to her vocal while also demonstrating her harmonizing capabilities in her duet with Vince Gill

Critics have said Clarkson has a soprano voice. Arion Berger of Rolling Stone wrote that "her high notes are sweet and pillowy, her growl is bone-shaking and sexy, and her mid-range is amazingly confident." In reviewing a live performance of Clarkson's, Jon Caramanica of The New York Times said she "showed off a voice that moved in all sorts of ways, without ever appearing to strain", continuing "Ms. Clarkson, who has a malleable voice and a boatload of vocal confidence, might be a soul siren in the making". However, in a separate review of Stronger, Caramanica said Clarkson's voice is "too huge, too violent" for warmer and sweeter vocal stylings, stating "she's on a par with Taylor Swift when it comes to vengeance, and she'll do it louder and with more brutality in comparison to her contemporary." In a live review as part of her Stronger Tour, Sophie Sinclair of Hit The Floor said "Kelly's strong and powerful voice was flawless throughout the night, and some may even say she sounds better live than she does on her albums". Mark Deming from Phoenix New Times stated that "in an era when pop music means over-singing a song into a bloody pulp, Clarkson has consistently displayed both charisma and a welcome sense of restraint, knowing how to sound passionate and heartfelt without forgetting where the melody and the root note is supposed to go."

Dr. Luke, who produced some of Clarkson's hits, said "She has powerful lungs. She's like the Lance Armstrong of vocal cords." In an interview with Good Morning America, Simon Cowell was asked of the then six American Idol winners, who he thought had the best voice. Cowell immediately answered that Clarkson did "by a mile", noting that she was "up there" with other great singers such as Celine Dion. Esquire wrote that Clarkson has "the best voice in the history of pop music". Reviewing Stronger, Jody Rosen of Rolling Stone states, Clarkson has "one of music's most remarkable voices." Jason Lipshutz from Billboard considered Clarkson as one of the greatest singers in pop music. Regarding the controversial practice of lip-syncing, Clarkson says she never has and never will lip-sync, elaborating in an interview with Cory Myers, "I've actually never done that because I'm terrified; if I ever did that, something horrible would happen, the track would skip. I have a really unhealthy fear about it. So no, I've never done that". Clarkson has earned the title "Queen of Covers" for her ability to perform songs from artists of various genres.

=== Songwriting ===
In terms of songwriting, Clarkson has described herself as "an emotional writer", explaining that, unlike some of her peers and collaborators, she is unable to write music without a personal connection to the material. She stated, "I have to be feeling something, going through something, or inspired by something" in order to create songs, approaching songwriting as an emotional outlet. Following her 2020 divorce from Brandon Blackstock, Clarkson began performing a revised version of "Piece by Piece" during live shows, replacing several references to her ex-husband with lyrics about self-empowerment.

At the same time, she prefers not to write in the same location as other artists, opting for privacy and describing herself as "not a vulnerable writer". When she is credited for songwriting, she has usually contributed to both lyrics and melody. She considers "Miss Independent" to be the first song that helped establish her as a songwriter, setting a precedent for her career and paving the way for other songs she would write or co-write. In 2013, Clarkson published an open letter disputing claims made by Davis in his memoir The Soundtrack of My Life. Davis had written that Clarkson cried hysterically in his office after being pressured to record "Since U Been Gone". Clarkson countered that she became emotional not over that song, but in response to remarks Davis allegedly made about her songwriting on "Because of You", including criticism that its lyrics did not rhyme and suggesting that she "should just shut up and sing". She also criticized Davis for omitting his role in blaming the underperformance of My December on its lack of radio-friendly singles and her involvement in its songwriting.

Clarkson has stated that there have been several instances throughout her career where she declined songwriting credit on songs, despite making changes to them. However, she noted that she will typically request credit if she believes her contributions warrant it. In 2017, Clarkson said that she refused songwriting credit on "My Life Would Suck Without You", one of her biggest hits, as a form of protest against being forced by her record label to work with producer Dr. Luke after expressing that she had not enjoyed working with him prior. She has suggested that by doing so, she may have forfeited millions of dollars in potential royalties, but maintains that she is against recording artists stealing credit from professional songwriters.

=== Influences ===
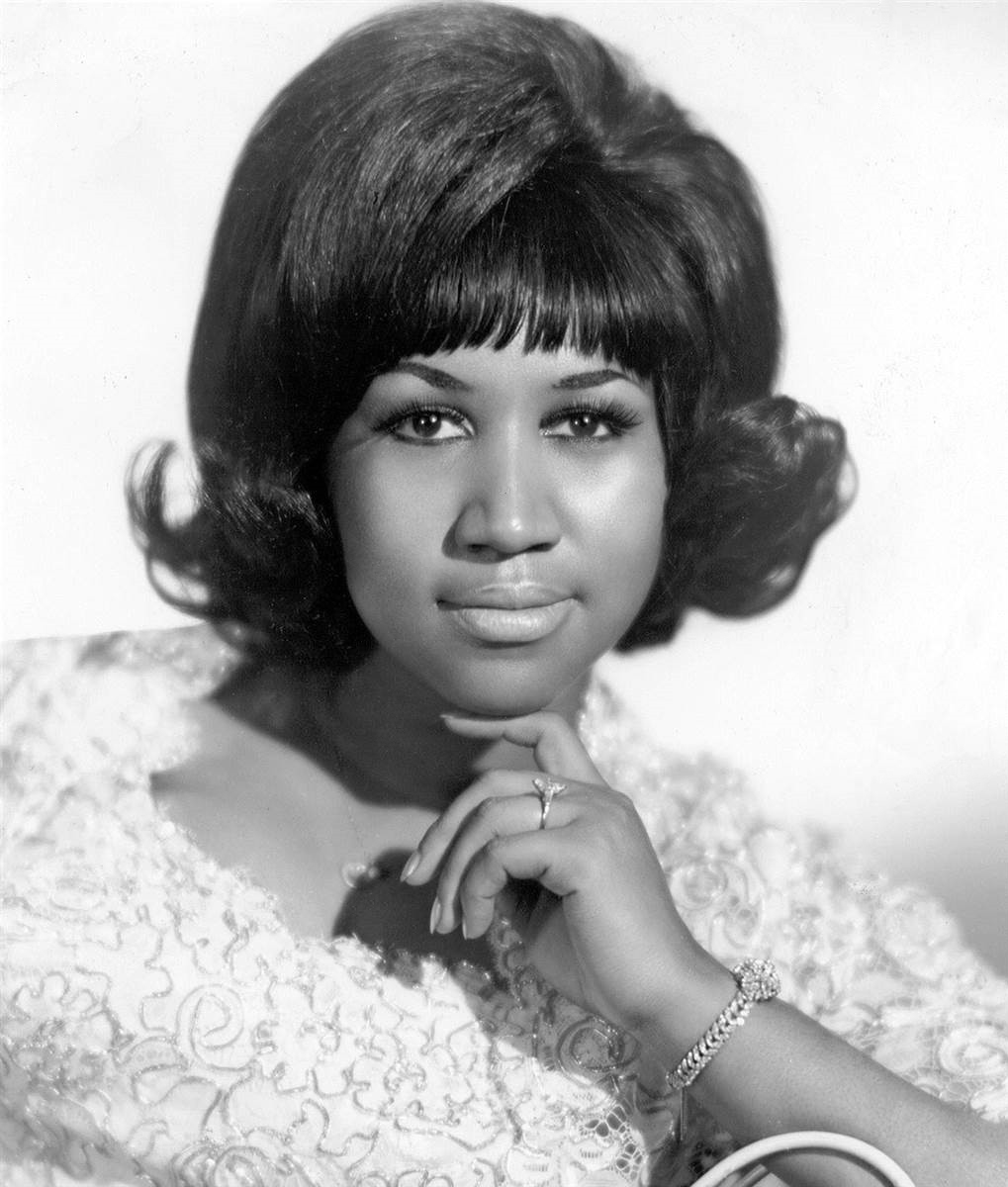
Soul singer Aretha Franklin was a major influence on Clarkson. Franklin herself remarked of Clarkson's potential to be an "enduring pop star" and a prospective broadway singer.

At age eight, Clarkson was first inspired to venture into music during a visit to an African-American church in Fort Worth, Texas. She recalled: "I was like, 'Wow, whatever they're feeling, I want to feel it too'." Clarkson has been influenced by musicians across various genres. She cited soul singer Aretha Franklin as her major influence. Many of her chosen Idol numbers were Aretha Franklin covers, including "(You Make Me Feel Like) A Natural Woman", which is considered her breakout moment during the competition. Other soul acts who influenced Clarkson were Whitney Houston, Mariah Carey, Etta James and Stevie Wonder. Clarkson was also influenced by Christina Aguilera, by rock acts such as Radiohead, Garbage, Aerosmith, and Jimi Hendrix, as well as Reba McEntire, Bette Midler, and Rosemary Clooney. Regarding her musical influence, Clarkson explained:

I grew up with three totally different parents that were into different music. My stepfather is into Willie Nelson and Elvis and all that kind of stuff. And my real father is into Whitney and Mariah, and Aretha, all those soulful singers. My mom is into more, like, adult contemporary—Celine Dion, Barbra [Streisand], Bette Midler, all those types of things. And then my brother is a big influence on me. He's like ten years older than me, so you always wanna be around your cool brother and hang out, so I grew up loving Guns N' Roses. I was all about Metallica. I was all about all those bands, and I still am. I love Aerosmith and No Doubt. I have so many influences on me that are so different. And even country. I love Reba McEntire. I could listen to her all the time.

In 2006, Clarkson said she does not consider herself to be a pop singer, explaining, "Rock is what I love". Clarkson often covers rock songs on her Kellyoke segment of her talk show, such as Metallica's "Sad but True", and Heart's "Crazy on You".

=== Musical style ===
Although Clarkson's music primarily incorporates pop, her discography also spans rock, country, and R&B. Her style has been described as pop rock, pop-punk, and power pop. Her intention behind writing songs is to give her emotions the ability to transcend beyond herself and connect with others in the world. She means to be able to give people comfort through relatability at the worst of their struggling times.

== Impact and legacy ==
Clarkson has scored over 100 number ones on the Billboard charts and has a star on the Hollywood Walk of Fame. Clarkson has sold over 25 million albums and 45 million singles worldwide, including 14 million albums and 35 million digital singles in the United States alone. She became the first artist to top each of Billboard's pop, adult contemporary, country and dance charts. She was ranked nineteenth on VH1's list of 100 Greatest Women in Music. Television channel Fuse included Clarkson among "30 Greatest Musicians to Come From Singing Competitions" list. Rolling Stone ranked her 194 on their list of 200 Best Singers of All Time in 2023. In 2025, Billboard ranked Clarkson at number 11 on its "Top 100 Women Artists of the 21st Century" list.

Music executive Simon Cowell believed that "What [Clarkson] sold in the UK, Europe, Asia had nothing to do with American Idol. It had everything to do with the fact that she made a great record and she's got an incredible voice. She's not a girl who got lucky in a talent competition; we got lucky to find her." According to The Hollywood Reporter, Clarkson is "the embodiment of the perfect pop star. Her unmistakable pipes are a powerful presence in top 40 and country, with forays into anthemic rock and dance." Nolan Feeney from Time asserted that Clarkson "has had more of a lasting impact on the pop music landscape than casual listeners might realize."

According to Billboard, Clarkson was a "phenomenon" who "helped legitimize" the impact of talent shows. The Washington Post wrote that "Clarkson's powerhouse voice and dynamic presence signaled that the music industry should take these reality show contestants seriously: Her first two albums, Thankful and Breakaway, sold about ten million copies combined, and her pop tunes became empowerment anthems across the globe." In 2007, journalist Nekesa Mumbi Moody reported that the success of Breakaway in particular was the true pivotal moment in establishing American Idol's credibility, proving that the show was capable of "finding someone who would have a career with longevity". Glenn Gamboa of Newsday believed Clarkson "has set the standard for all singing competition contestants with her savvy mix of pop, rock and country." Fox Broadcasting Company said that Clarkson gave "lasting credibility" to American Idol and "in so many ways she cleared a road" for all of the next contestants. George Varga from The San Diego Union-Tribune underlined the difference of Clarkson from most other talent show contestants is that she "writes or co-writes a fair number of [her] own songs. She is also the only one whose quest to follow her artistic instincts—the better to rock out and break free from the Idol cookie-cutter pop mold—prompted her to fire her management team and engage in a prolonged public battle with her record company, RCA."

Jon Lisi from PopMatters named Clarkson as one of the forces of female domination in pop music of the 2000s. He explained that "Clarkson's anti-sexual image appealed to those who were uncomfortable with Britney Spears' overt exhibitionism. When Clarkson performed 'Since U Been Gone' at the 2005 MTV Video Music Awards, for instance, she only showed her midriff, and it was clear that she was marketing herself to an alternative group of young females who liked pop music's conventional sound but didn't want to be confronted with sexual imagery." Mickey Rapkin of Billboard magazine, who called Clarkson a role model and compared her vocals to golden-era Aretha Franklin, stated that Clarkson "has never shied away from speaking her mind, whether in her propulsive pop anthems or on her filter-free Twitter feed." Clarkson has influenced other artists including Vanessa Hudgens, Demi Lovato, Ava Max, Jordin Sparks, Ashley Tisdale, Avril Lavigne, Kelsea Ballerini, and Priscilla Block.

== Personal life ==
In February 2012, Clarkson began dating talent manager Brandon Blackstock, son of her former manager Narvel Blackstock and former stepson of Reba McEntire. She married Blackstock on October 20, 2013, at Blackberry Farm in Walland, Tennessee. During their marriage, Brandon was her manager. They had two children, a daughter born June 12, 2014, and a son born April 12, 2016. In June 2020, Clarkson filed for divorce from Blackstock, citing irreconcilable differences. In March 2022, it was reported their divorce had been finalized. On November 21, 2023, Clarkson was awarded more than $2.6 million from Blackstock for commissions paid to him for business deals he procured as her manager. The California Labor Commissioner ruled that Blackstock violated the state's Talent Agencies Act by handling these deals, which should have been managed by Clarkson's talent agents at Creative Artists Agency. The ruling included commissions from Clarkson's role on The Voice and other promotional agreements, but did not require repayment for deals related to The Kelly Clarkson Show. Blackstock died of melanoma on August 7, 2025, aged 48.

In October 2019, Clarkson said that she has been managing an autoimmune condition and a thyroid condition since 2006, which she had previously addressed on Today in 2018.

In February 2022, Clarkson changed her legal name to Kelly Brianne. In an interview, she said she did so due to a strained relationship with her late father, but that her professional name would not change.

=== Political views ===
In 2011, Clarkson said, "I am a Republican but I actually voted Democrat last election", and expressed support for Ron Paul. Clarkson later said she would vote for Barack Obama in the 2012 United States presidential election, telling the Daily Star, "I can't support Romney's policies as I have a lot of gay friends and I don't think it's fair they can't get married." She added, "I'm not a hardcore feminist but we can't be going back to the '50s."

In the 2016 United States presidential election, Clarkson endorsed Hillary Clinton and said that Donald Trump made her "genuinely frightened for our nation". In 2017, Clarkson said she is a Democrat.

== Philanthropy ==
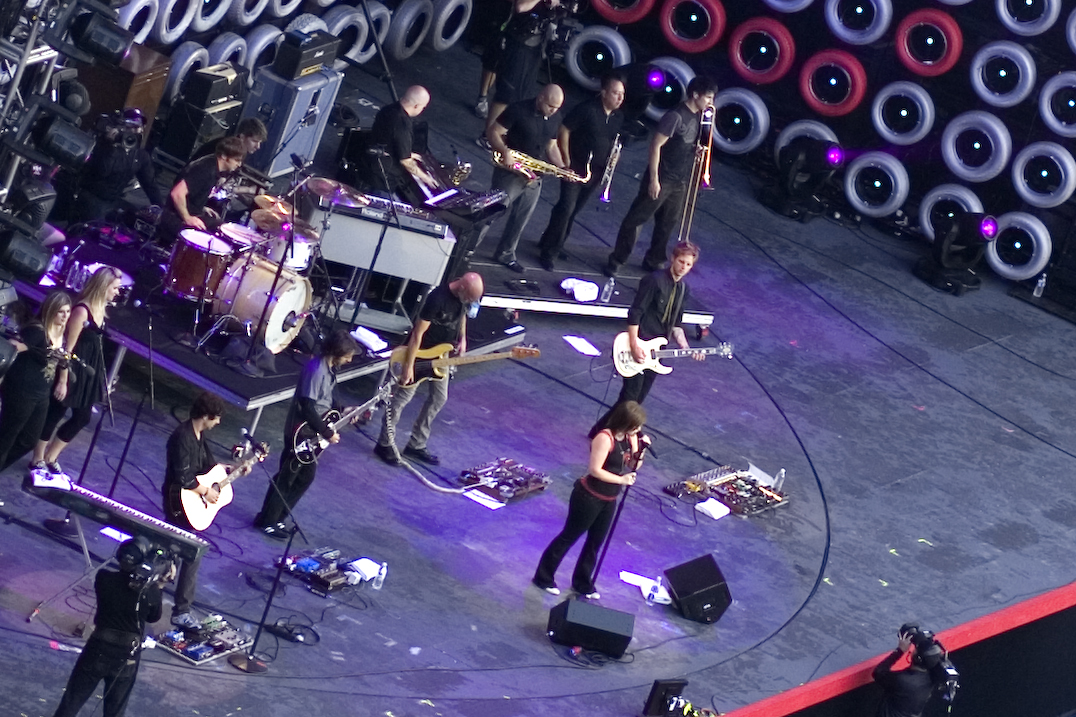
Clarkson performing at the 2007 Live Earth charity concert

In April 2007, Clarkson took part in "Idol Gives Back", a fundraiser for people in poverty in Africa and the U.S., performing "Up to the Mountain" with Jeff Beck. She also performed a five-song set later that year on the American leg of Live Earth concerts promoting environmental awareness about climate change. She has served as ambassador for the March of Dimes since she was on American Idol, raising money regularly and assisting in volunteer service, having walked for "March for Babies" for the cause of improvement of the health of mothers and babies. Clarkson also got involved in the organization Houses of Hope, which builds orphanages for children in South Africa affected by HIV/AIDS, abuse, and poverty. She has visited those children and also participated in "A Night for Hope" fund-raiser concert (held by Clarkson's background vocal singers, Jill and Kate), performing a song she wrote after her trip to South Africa, "You Still Won't Know What It's Like". Clarkson also supports the charities Save the Children, UNICEF, "Do Something" and "STOMP Out Bullying", and music causes like the Save the Music Foundation.

Clarkson had a ranch in Texas for unwanted animals, which included amputee goats, blind dogs, and horses that survived colic; there are more than 80 animals at the sanctuary. She helped provide veterinary care for them and found them an adoptive family. On March 1, 2013, she performed in a benefit concert supporting the Omaha-based Opportunity Education Foundation, which provides access to education for children around the world, saying, "Education was a key part of my childhood, and I am better for it. Anything for education I am really into and especially for kids. A lot of people don't have computers, and they can't afford them. Without education, you get far behind. As long as they have a chance, you know, I think that's important. I want every kid to have a chance." In 2013, Clarkson teamed with State Farm Insurance to support teen safe driving as a part of Celebrate My Drive program, and supported Feeding America and The Ad Council and its Child Hunger PSA Campaign, which provides food for children facing hunger. Also in 2013, she participated in Green Mountain Coffee's Great Coffee, Good Vibes, Choose Fair Trade campaign, traveling to coffee farms in Peru to draw attention to the importance of Fair Trade certification.

== Discography ==
Studio albums

- Thankful (2003)
- Breakaway (2004)
- My December (2007)
- All I Ever Wanted (2009)
- Stronger (2011)
- Wrapped in Red (2013)
- Piece by Piece (2015)
- Meaning of Life (2017)
- When Christmas Comes Around... (2021)
- Chemistry (2023)

== Tours and residencies ==
=== Headlining ===
- The Breakaway Tour (2005–2006)
- Hazel Eyes Tour (2005)
- Addicted Tour (2006)
- My December Tour (2007–2008)
- All I Ever Wanted Tour (2009–2010)
- Stronger Tour (2012)
- Piece by Piece Tour (2015)
- Meaning of Life Tour (2019)

=== Co-headlining ===
- American Idols LIVE! Tour 2002 (2002) (with the American Idol season one finalists)
- Independent Tour (2004) (with Clay Aiken)
- 2 Worlds 2 Voices Tour (2008) (with Reba McEntire)
- Kelly Clarkson / The Fray Tour (2012) (with The Fray)
- 12th Annual Honda Civic Tour (2013) (with Maroon 5)

=== Residencies ===
- Chemistry: An Intimate Evening with Kelly Clarkson (2023–2024)
- Kelly Clarkson: Studio Sessions (2025–2026)

== Filmography ==
Films starred

- Issues 101 (2002)
- From Justin to Kelly (2003)
- The Star (2017)
- UglyDolls (2019)
- Trolls World Tour (2020)

Television series

- American Idol (2002)
- American Dreams (2003–2004)
- Duets (2012)
- The Voice (2018–2021, 2023, 2026)
- The Kelly Clarkson Show (2019–2026)
- American Song Contest (2022)
- Songs & Stories with Kelly Clarkson (2025)

== Written works ==
- Clarkson, Kelly (2016). River Rose and the Magical Lullaby. New York: HarperCollins. ISBN 978-0-0624-2756-4.
- Clarkson, Kelly (2017). River Rose and the Magical Christmas. New York: HarperCollins. ISBN 978-0-0626-9764-6.

== See also ==
- List of artists who reached number one on the Australian singles chart
- List of artists who reached number one on the UK Singles Chart
- List of Idols winners
- List of best-selling music artists
