= Love So Soft =

2017 song by Kelly Clarkson

Single by Kelly Clarkson

from the album Meaning of Life
- B-side: "Move You"
- Released: September 7, 2017
- Recorded: 2017
- Studio: Glenwood Place Studios (Burbank, California)
- Genre: Soul; trap; R&B
- Length: 2:52
- Label: Atlantic
- Songwriters: Maureen "Mozella" McDonald; Jesse Shatkin; Priscilla Renea
- Producer: Jesse Shatkin

Kelly Clarkson singles chronology
"Softly and Tenderly" (2016)	"Love So Soft" (2017)	"Christmas Eve" (2017)

Music video
- "Love So Soft" on YouTube

"Love So Soft" is a song by American singer Kelly Clarkson, from her eighth studio album, Meaning of Life (2017). Accompanied by another track "Move You", it was released on September 7, 2017, by Atlantic Records as the lead single from the album. It was produced by Jesse Shatkin, who co-wrote the song with Maureen "Mozella" McDonald and Priscilla Renea. A brassy soul-trap R&B anthem, it was promulgated by Atlantic as her introductory record in the soul music genre. Lyrically, it is about wanting to get closer to someone, after challenging him to give respect and protection before giving him a love that is described as "so soft" in return.

Upon its release, "Love So Soft" has received a positive response from music pundits, some of whom praised Clarkson's vocal performance. Modestly successful in the charts, it charted at number 47 on the Billboard Hot 100 chart and became her sixth song to reach the top of the Billboard Hot Dance Club Songs chart. It has since been certified platinum by the Recording Industry Association of America and gold by Music Canada. It also received a Grammy Award nomination for Best Pop Solo Performance at its 60th annual presentation.

Produced by Nathan Scherrer and directed by Dave Meyers, the accompanying music video for "Love So Soft" features Clarkson singing the track in various settings of how love can come across, from explosive and defiant, to bold, sexy & sassy. She has also performed the song in multitude of televised live events to promote the release of Meaning of Life, and was included in the set list of her Meaning of Life concert tour.

== Composition ==
"Love So Soft"
A 21-second sample of "Love So Soft", which features trap beats and horn instruments.

"Love So Soft" was produced by Jesse Shatkin, whom Clarkson had previously collaborated on her studio albums Stronger and Piece by Piece. He co-wrote the song with Maureen "Mozella" McDonald and Priscilla Renea, both of whom also contributed to its vocal production. A soul-trap R&B anthem, the song sings about wanting to get closer to someone, after challenging him to give respect and protection before giving him a love that is described as "so soft" in return. To emulate a soulful sound that gives tribute to classic R&B while still sounding contemporary, Atlantic Records Chairman Craig Kallman commissioned several members of the American soul band Earth, Wind & Fire, led by Verdine White and Gary Bias, to perform in the song's recording.

Several music critics observed its music as a departure from Clarkson's previous releases. Hugh McIntyre of Forbes described the song's trap verses as "odd" on its own, but is complementary harmonized "when the horns kick in and bring the soul the song needed". Idolator's Mike Wass musically described it as "simultaneously of another era (the '1990s) and quintessentially 2017".

== Release and reception ==
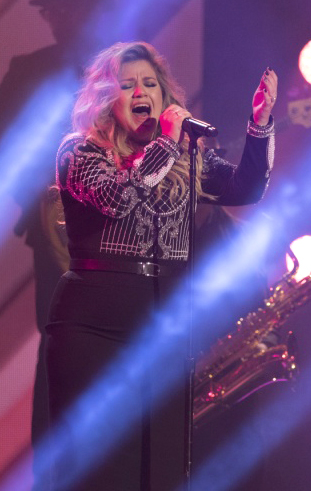
Clarkson performing "Love So Soft" at the 2017 Invictus Games closing ceremony.

"Love So Soft" was first released by Atlantic on September 7, 2017, on digital and streaming music platforms as the lead single to Meaning of Life, accompanied by another track "Move You" as its B-side. The track was then sent to American radio stations from September 11–12, 2017. Clarkson also recorded a performance of the song, which, along with a cover version of Prince's Kiss, was exclusively issued as a "Spotify Singles" release on the Spotify music streaming service on November 8, 2017. A 45-rpm 7-inch single pressing was issued with Hallmark on January 30, 2018, as part of their Valentine's Day promotional campaign.

=== Live performances ===
Clarkson has performed "Love So Soft" in a multitude of televised live events to promote the release of Meaning of Life. On September 8, 2017, a day after its release date, she debuted the song on The Today Show. She has also performed it on the television programs America's Got Talent, The Ellen DeGeneres Show, 'The Graham Norton Show, and The Voice of Germany; and during the broadcast of the festivities of the 2017 We Day and the 2017 Invictus Games. At the live broadcast of the 2017 American Music Awards, she performed the song in a medley with her previous single "Miss Independent" (2003). Clarkson also played a selection of the track in her guest appearance during the Carpool Karaoke segment of The Late Late Show with James Corden. Throughout the first half of 2019, she included the song in her set-list of her Meaning of Life Tour.

=== Critical response ===
"Love So Soft" has received a positive response from music critics, some of whom praised Clarkson's vocal performance in the song. Time correspondent Raisa Bruner wrote that the song "works as a nice showpiece for Clarkson's voice", while Rolling Stone's Jon Blistein described it as brassy, and along with "Move You", as galvanic. Writing for NPR, Karen Gwee observed that Clarkson's performance on the chorus is more chanted than belted, but nevertheless praised her voice which pulls the track out of the "ubiquitous-anonymous, grocery aisle territory", and remarked that only a few others have her "easy confidence and her vocal ability" to flaunt fully on the bridge and final chorus. In his report for Idolator, Wass compared the song as falling closer to the Back to Basics-era Christina Aguilera in its blend of old and new. Reviewing for 'Forbes, McIntyre has initially expressed reservation for Clarkson venturing into trap territory, but remarked that the worry will be only momentary, as its horns aid to bring the soul the song needed. Describing it as musical follow-up to Duffy's "Mercy" (2008), he also noticed that the song didn't have the immediate punch her previous lead singles "Since U Been Gone" and "My Life Would Suck Without You" did, but wrote that that appears to be the point—which is to present an older, wiser, and more experienced Clarkson. Following its release, "Love So Soft" received a Grammy Award nomination for Best Pop Solo Performance at the 60th Annual ceremony.

=== Chart performance ===
"Love So Soft" became a moderate hit in the United States, where it debuted at number 62 on the Billboard Hot 100 chart for the week ending September 29, 2017, and peaked at number 47 following the album's release on the week ending November 18, 2017. It also became her sixth song to reach the top of the Billboard Hot Dance Club Songs chart. In addition, "Love So Soft" attained a top ten position on the Billboard Adult Top 40 chart and has reached the top forty of the Billboard Adult Contemporary, Dance/Mix Show Airplay, and Mainstream Top 40 charts. In 2019, it was certified platinum by the Recording Industry Association of America. Internationally, "Love So Soft" charted inside the top 100 of the Billboard Canadian Hot 100 chart, ARIA Singles Chart, and the Official UK Singles Chart. In 2018, it was certified gold by Music Canada.

== Music video ==
Behind-the-scenes animation of making the music video "Love So Soft". In this scene, Clarkson and her backup singers, clad in green garments, are filmed using green screen and motion control photography, which were layered together using digital visual effects. The final composite shots were then included in the final edit of the music video. Various music critics have praised the use of visual effects to complement Clarkson's performance of the track.

The accompanying music video for "Love So Soft" was released on the same day as the single. Produced by Nathan Scherrer, it was filmed by Dave Meyers, who had previously directed Clarkson's previous music video for "Breakaway" (2004). The video presents Clarkson and her background vocalists performing the track in various settings, including a whitened Southern cornfield and a mountaintop luxury abode. Featuring special visual effects made by Timber VFX, its scenes depict Clarkson at different themes of how love can come across — from explosive and defiant, to bold, sexy & sassy. Some of those setups involve a rotating body with the faces of Clarkson and her backup singers, another shows her singing in an exploding room, and ends with her singing in a field as a flock of yellow birds form a "murmuration" around her.

Meyers originally intended the video to filmed on a single stage accompanied with a little piece of white shrubbery. Midway through its production, Timber extended the scene's settings to feature various setups, which required to be filmed using motion control and in front of a green screen. Though the main camera used for the shoot was a Red Digital Cinema at 90 frames per second (fps), its cutaway scenes were filmed using a Phantom camera at 25,000 fps, requiring Clarkson to record her scenes singing in limited portions and at double speed to aid in synchronizing to the audio track. This resulted to what Post magazine described as a "whimsical exposition of Clarkson in various settings, synchronized with the soulful, jazzy notion of the song". Several music pundits praised the video as successful showpiece to the track, with some noting its '90s influence and its "psychedelic" visual effects.

== Track listing ==
Meaning of Life – digital download pre-order
No.	Title	Length
2.	"Love So Soft"	2:52
5.	"Move You"	3:22

Love So Soft – streaming
No.	Title	Length
1.	"Love So Soft"	2:52

Cash Cash Remix – streaming
No.	Title	Length
1.	"Love So Soft" (Cash Cash Remix)	4:16

Ryan Riback Remix – streaming
No.	Title	Length
1.	"Love So Soft" (Ryan Riback Remix)	3:07

Mark Knight & Ben Remember Remix – streaming
No.	Title	Length
1.	"Love So Soft" (Mark Knight & Ben Remember Remix)	6:51

Dave Audé Remix – streaming
No.	Title	Length
1.	"Love So Soft" (Dave Audé Remix)	2:50

Cedric Gervais Remix – streaming
No.	Title	Length
1.	"Love So Soft" (Cedric Gervais Remix)	3:56

Mr. Collipark Remix – streaming
No.	Title	Length
1.	"Love So Soft" (Mr. Collipark Remix)	2:50

Spotify Singles – streaming
No.	Title	Length
1.	"Love So Soft" (Recorded at Spotify Studios NYC)	2:54
2.	"Kiss" (Recorded at Spotify Studios NYC)	4:03

Hallmark Vinyl Record Card – 7" single
No.	Title	Length
1.	"Love So Soft"	2:52
2.	"Meaning of Life"	3:51

== Personnel ==
Credits lifted from master recording metadata.

- Gary Bias – tenor saxophone
- Raymond Brown – conductor
- Bobby Burns – trumpet
- Chris Cerullo – assistant engineering
- Kelly Clarkson – lead vocals
- Samuel Dent – engineering
- Sean Erick – trumpet, flugelhorn
- Earth, Wind & Fire Horn Section – Horns
- Chuck Findley – trumpet
- Iain Findlay – assistant engineering
- Michael Harris – engineering
- Nicole Hurst – background vocals
- Sean Kantrowitz – guitar
- Maureen "Mozella" McDonald – background vocals, vocal production
- Gabriel Noel – bass
- The Regiment Horns – Horns
- Priscilla Renea – background vocals, vocal production
- Buddy Ross – organ
- Bridget Sarai – background vocals
- Jesse Shatkin – bass, engineering, production, drum programming, drums, guitar, programming
- Leon Silva – baritone saxophone, tenor saxophone
- Todd Tidwell – assistant engineering
- JoAnn Tominaga – coordinator
- Verdine White – bass
- Kevin Williams Jr. – trombone, tuba
- Reggie Young – trombone

== Charts ==
Weekly chart performance for "Love So Soft"
Chart (2017–2018)	Peak position
Australia (ARIA)	88
Canada Hot 100 (Billboard)	73
Canada AC (Billboard)	10
Canada CHR/Top 40 (Billboard)	35
Canada Hot AC (Billboard)	10
Czech Republic Airplay (ČNS IFPI)	63
New Zealand Heatseekers (RMNZ)	3
Poland (Polish Airplay Top 100)	31
Scotland Singles (OCC)	49
South Korea International (Gaon)	94
UK Singles (OCC)	81
US Billboard Hot 100	47
US Adult Contemporary (Billboard)	15
US Adult Pop Airplay (Billboard)	7
US Dance/Mix Show Airplay (Billboard)	36
US Dance Club Songs (Billboard)	1
US Pop Airplay (Billboard)	21
Venezuela Anglo (Record Report)	17

2017 year-end chart performance for "Love So Soft"
Chart (2017)	Position
US Adult Top 40 (Billboard)	48

2018 year-end chart performance for "Love So Soft"
Chart (2018)	Position
US Adult Contemporary (Billboard)	45

== Certifications ==
Region	Certification	Certified units/sales
Canada (Music Canada)	Gold	40,000^{‡}
United States (RIAA)	Platinum	1,000,000^{‡}
^{‡} Sales+streaming figures based on certification alone.

== Release history ==
List of releases of "Love So Soft"
Region	Date	Format	Version	Label	Catalog number	Ref.
Various	September 7, 2017	Digital download	Meaning of Life pre-order	Atlantic	USAT21703569	
Various	September 7, 2017	Streaming	Single	Atlantic	USAT21703569	
United States	September 11, 2017	Adult contemporary radio	Single	Atlantic; RRP	—N/a	
United States	September 12, 2017	Contemporary hit radio	Single	Atlantic; RRP	—N/a	
Various	October 6, 2017	Streaming	Cash Cash Remix	Atlantic	USAT21704062	
Various	October 6, 2017	Streaming	Ryan Riback Remix	Atlantic	USAT21704064	
Various	October 25, 2017	Streaming	Mark Knight & Ben Remember Remix	Atlantic	USAT21705003	
Various	October 25, 2017	Streaming	Cedric Gervais Remix	Atlantic	USAT21704703	
Various	October 25, 2017	Streaming	Mr. Collipark Remix	Atlantic	USAT21704748	
Various	October 25, 2017	Streaming	Dave Audé Remix	Atlantic	USAT21704704	
Italy	October 27, 2017	Contemporary hit radio	Single	Warner Music	—N/a	
Various	November 8, 2017	Streaming	Spotify Singles	Atlantic	USAT21704705	
Various	January 30, 2018	7-inch single	Hallmark Vinyl Record Card	Atlantic; Rhino	OPSV-9011	

== See also ==
- List of Billboard number-one dance singles of 2017
