= River Rose and the Magical Lullaby =

2016 book by Kelly Clarkson

- Book cover
- Author: Kelly Clarkson
- Illustrator: Laura Hughes
- Language: English
- Series: River Rose
- Genre: Children's literature
- Publisher: HarperCollins
- Publication date: October 4, 2016
- Publication place: United States
- Pages: 32
- ISBN: 978-0-0624-2756-4
- Followed by: River Rose and the Magical Christmas

River Rose and the Magical Lullaby is a children's picture book written by American singer Kelly Clarkson, first published by HarperCollins on October 4, 2016. Illustrated by Laura Hughes, the story centers on a little girl who was too ecstatic to fall asleep on the eve of her first trip to the zoo. The book debuted at number 7 on The New York Times Best Sellers List for Children's Picture Books.

== Premise ==
It's a big day for River Rose as she is about to visit the zoo. But when she is too excited to fall asleep the night before, it takes a magical lullaby from her mom to send her off on a dream and musical adventure—soon River Rose is hopscotching with the hippos, slip-sliding with the penguins, and dancing with the big brown bears.

== Background and publication ==
River Rose and the Magical Lullaby was inspired by Clarkson's daughter, whom she took to various international locations—such as Vietnam, the United Kingdom, and Australia, while in the midst of a promotional campaign for her seventh studio album, Piece by Piece in 2015. Believing that her daughter was too young to be able to remember the places they visited, she wrote a variety of short stories to accompany a set of photographs she had filmed during their trips abroad for future use. Clarkson later developed those stories into a picture book, in which she remarked that she hoped that other children can also be inspired by it and know they that can achieve anything.

On February 9, 2016, David Linker of HarperCollins acquired the worldwide publishing rights for the book from the Creative Artists Agency, which it plans to publish on October 4, 2016. HarperCollins also announced an original lullaby recording written and performed by Clarkson would accompany the book in its release. The book, released for sale on October 4, 2016, includes a link to a HarperCollins' website where the lullaby, "River Rose's Magical Lullaby", can be heard. The HarperCollins' website also directs the user to SoundCloud as a means to stream the recording. "River Rose's Magical Lullaby" was released as a promotional single digital download to online music stores or available to stream through music streaming services.

On October 3, 2016, the day before the book's street date, a lyric video for the book's lullaby was uploaded to Clarkson's official YouTube channel.

== Critical reception ==
Prior to release of the book, Michelle Lynn praised it, stating that the book "exceeded all expectations." She noted that "the pictures are emotive and cute. The words flow off your tongue, making it much more pleasant to read the same book a million times" and "the rhymes never once lean toward the cheesy side". She concluded the review on a positive note, saying that "there isn't a single thing not to like about this story or the way it's presented".
