= List of songs written by Kelly Clarkson =

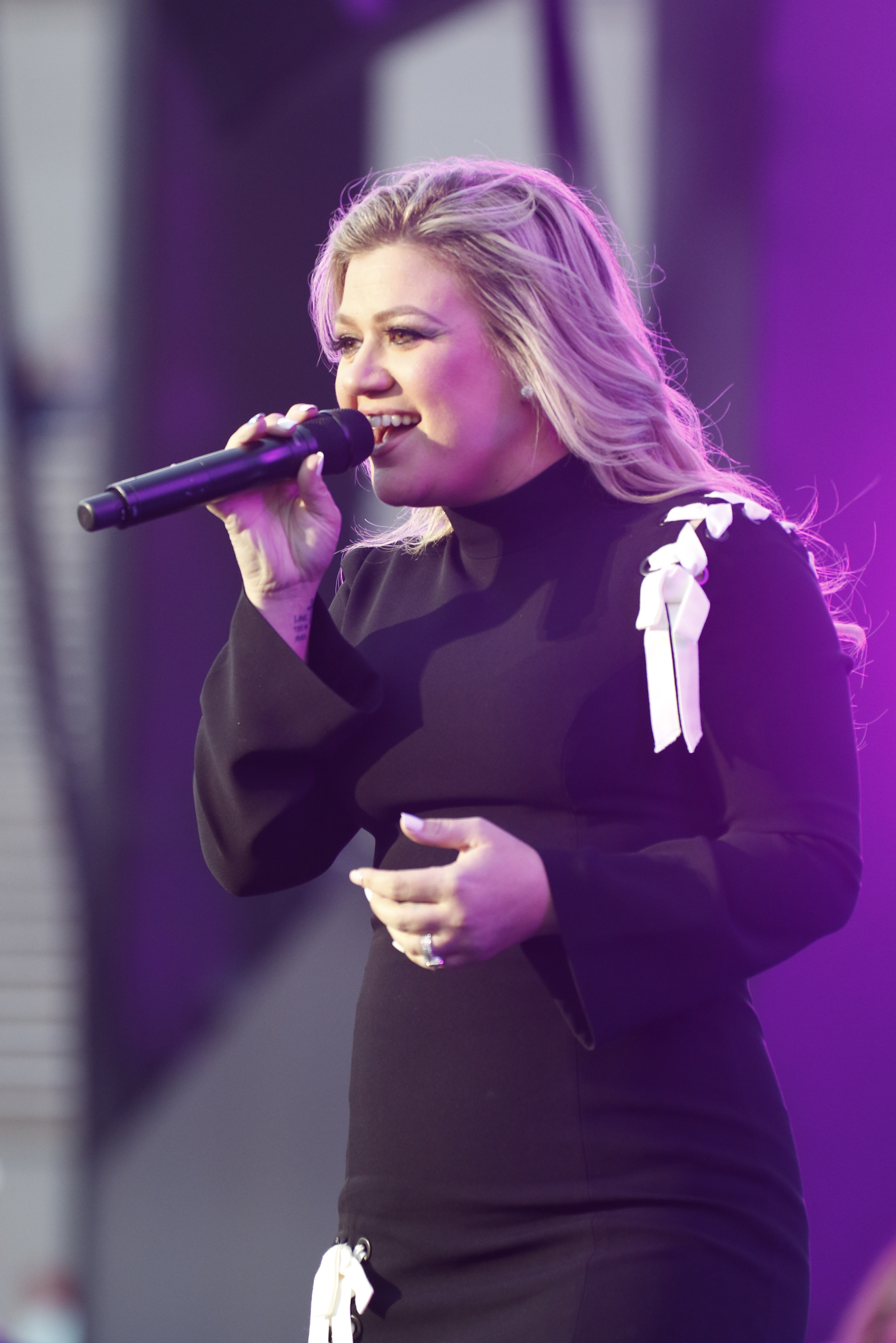
Clarkson performing in 2018

American singer-songwriter Kelly Clarkson has written songs for all ten of her albums, her greatest hits album, for other artists, as well as several unreleased songs. She rose to fame after winning the inaugural season of American Idol in 2002, where she received a recording contract with RCA Records. Clarkson began writing songs as a teenager, and one of those songs, "Because of You," which she wrote at age 16, ended up on her second studio album, Breakaway.

Beginning with her third album, My December, Clarkson started writing with her band, particularly with her longtime music director Jason Halbert and guitarist Aben Eubanks. In 2016, after completing her recording contract with RCA, she signed with Atlantic Records, which gave her full creative control. In 2025, Clarkson started her own record label, High Road Records.

== Songs ==
Key
†	Indicates single release
#	Indicates promotional single release

List of songs written or co-written by Kelly Clarkson
Song	Artist(s)	Writer(s)	Album	Year	Ref.
"4 Carats"	Kelly Clarkson	Kelly Clarkson; Cathy Dennis; Greg Kurstin; Olivia Waithe	Wrapped in Red	2013	
"Addicted"	Kelly Clarkson	Kelly Clarkson; David Hodges; Ben Moody	Breakaway	2004	
"Already Gone" †	Kelly Clarkson	Kelly Clarkson; Ryan Tedder	All I Ever Wanted	2009	
"Bad Reputation"	Kelly Clarkson	Kelly Clarkson; Greg Kurstin; Kelly Sheehan; Bonnie McKee	Piece by Piece	2015	
"Be Still"	Kelly Clarkson	Kelly Clarkson; Aben Eubanks	My December	2007	
"Because of You" †	Kelly Clarkson	Kelly Clarkson; David Hodges; Ben Moody	Breakaway	2004	
"Behind These Hazel Eyes" †	Kelly Clarkson	Kelly Clarkson; Max Martin; Lukasz Gottwald	Breakaway	2004	
"Can I Have a Kiss"	Kelly Clarkson	Kelly Clarkson; Jimmy Messer; Dwight Baker	My December	2007	
"Catch My Breath" †	Kelly Clarkson	Kelly Clarkson; Jason Halbert	Greatest Hits – Chapter One	2012	
"Chemistry"	Kelly Clarkson	Kelly Clarkson; Jesse Shatkin; Erik Serna	Chemistry	2023	
"Chivas"	Kelly Clarkson	Kelly Clarkson; Jimmy Messer	My December	2007	
"Christmas Eve" †	Kelly Clarkson	Kelly Clarkson; Jason Halbert	—N/a	2017	
"Christmas Isn't Canceled (Just You)" †	Kelly Clarkson	Kelly Clarkson; Jason Halbert; Jessi Collins	When Christmas Comes Around...	2021	
"Cry"	Kelly Clarkson	Kelly Clarkson; Jason Halbert; Mark Lee Townsend	All I Ever Wanted	2009	
"Did You Know"	Kelly Clarkson	Kelly Clarkson; Jesse Shatkin; Chris Kelly; John Ryan; Ruth-Anne Cunningham	Chemistry	2023	
"Dirty Little Secret"	Kelly Clarkson	Kelly Clarkson; Jimmy Messer	My December	2007	
"Don't Be a Girl About It"	Kelly Clarkson	Kelly Clarkson; Brent Kutzle	Stronger	2011	
"Don't Waste Your Time" †	Kelly Clarkson	Kelly Clarkson; Jimmy Messer; Malcolm Pardon; Fredrick Rinman	My December	2007	
"Don't You Pretend"	Kelly Clarkson	Kelly Clarkson; Jesse Shatkin; Maureen "Mozella" McDonald	Meaning of Life	2017	
"Down to You"	Kelly Clarkson	Kelly Clarkson; Jesse Shatkin; Maureen "Mozella" McDonald	Chemistry	2023	
"Einstein"	Kelly Clarkson	Kelly Clarkson; Toby Gad; Bridget Kelly; James Fauntleroy	Stronger	2011	
"Every Christmas"	Kelly Clarkson	Kelly Clarkson; Aben Eubanks	Wrapped in Red	2013	
"Fading"	Kelly Clarkson	Kelly Clarkson; Malcolm Pardon; Fredrick Rinman	My December	2007	
"Favorite Kind of High" †	Kelly Clarkson	Kelly Clarkson; Jesse Shatkin; Carly Rae Jepsen	Chemistry	2023	
"Get Up (A Cowboys Anthem)" #	Kelly Clarkson	Kelly Clarkson; Josh Abraham; Oliver Goldstein; Ryan Williams	—N/a	2012	
"Glow" #	Kelly Clarkson; Chris Stapleton	Kelly Clarkson; Jason Halbert; Danja; Hayley Warner; Jesse Thomas	When Christmas Comes Around...	2021	
"Go" #	Kelly Clarkson	Kelly Clarkson; Rhett Lawrence; Suzzane Benson	—N/a	2006	
"Go High"	Kelly Clarkson	Kelly Clarkson; Jesse Shatkin; Maureen "Mozella" McDonald	Meaning of Life	2017	
"Goodbye"	Kelly Clarkson	Kelly Clarkson; Jason Halbert	Chemistry	2023	
"Haunted"	Kelly Clarkson	Kelly Clarkson; Jimmy Messer; Jason Halbert	My December	2007	
"Hear Me"	Kelly Clarkson	Kelly Clarkson; Kara DioGuardi; Clif Magness	Breakaway	2004	
"Hello"	Kelly Clarkson	Kelly Clarkson; Josh Abraham; Oliver Goldstein; Bonnie McKee	Stronger	2011	
"Hole"	Kelly Clarkson	Kelly Clarkson; Jimmy Messer; Dwight Baker	My December	2007	
"How I Feel"	Kelly Clarkson	Kelly Clarkson; Jimmy Messer; Dwight Baker	My December	2007	
"I Had a Dream"	Kelly Clarkson	Kelly Clarkson; Greg Kurstin	Piece by Piece	2015	
"I Hate Love" #	Kelly Clarkson; Steve Martin	Kelly Clarkson; Jesse Shatkin; Nick Jonas	Chemistry	2023	
"I Want You"	Kelly Clarkson	Kelly Clarkson; Joakim Åhlund	All I Ever Wanted	2009	
"I Won't Give Up"	Kelly Clarkson	Kelly Clarkson; Jesse Shatkin; Jessia Karpov; Max Wolfgang; Peter Townsend	Chemistry	2023	
"I'd Be Lyin'" †	Kelly Clarkson	Kelly Clarkson; Jason Halbert; Jaco Caraco	—N/a	2026	
"In the Blue"	Kelly Clarkson	Kelly Clarkson; Jesse Shatkin; Anjulie Persaud; Fransisca Hall	Piece by Piece	2015	
"If I Can't Have You"	Kelly Clarkson	Kelly Clarkson; Ryan Tedder	All I Ever Wanted	2009	
"Impossible"	Kelly Clarkson	Kelly Clarkson; Ryan Tedder	All I Ever Wanted	2009	
"Irvine"	Kelly Clarkson	Kelly Clarkson; Aben Eubanks	My December	2007	
"Judas"	Kelly Clarkson	Kelly Clarkson; Jimmy Messer; Dwight Baker	My December	2007	
"Let Me Down"	Kelly Clarkson	Kelly Clarkson; Chris DeStefano	Stronger	2011	
"Lighthouse" †	Kelly Clarkson	Kelly Clarkson; Aben Eubanks; Jesse Shatkin	Chemistry	2023	
"Magic"	Kelly Clarkson	Kelly Clarkson; Jesse Shatkin; Randy Runyon	Chemistry	2023	
"Maybe"	Kelly Clarkson	Kelly Clarkson; Jimmy Messer; Aben Eubanks	My December	2007	
"Me" †	Kelly Clarkson	Kelly Clarkson; Gayle; Josh Ronen	Chemistry	2023	
"Merry Christmas Baby"	Kelly Clarkson	Kelly Clarkson; Aben Eubanks	When Christmas Comes Around...	2021	
"Merry Christmas (To the One I Used to Know)"	Kelly Clarkson	Kelly Clarkson; Aben Eubanks; Jason Halbert	When Christmas Comes Around...	2021	
"Mine"†	Kelly Clarkson	Kelly Clarkson; Eric Serma; Jesse Shatkin	Chemistry	2023	
"Miss Independent" †	Kelly Clarkson	Kelly Clarkson; Christina Aguilera; Matt Morris; Rhett Lawrence	Thankful	2003	
"My Life Would Suck Without You" † (Note: Clarkson co-wrote on "My Life Would Suck Without You" but refused writing credits because she refused to be associated with Dr. Luke.)	Kelly Clarkson	Kelly Clarkson; Max Martin; Lukasz Gottwald; Claude Kelly	All I Ever Wanted	2009	
"Never Again" †	Kelly Clarkson	Kelly Clarkson; Jimmy Messer	My December	2007	
"Not Today"	Kelly Clarkson	Kelly Clarkson; Jimmy Messer; David Khane	My December	2007	
"One Minute" †	Kelly Clarkson	Kelly Clarkson; Kara DioGuardi; Chantal Kreviazuk; Raine Maida	My December	2007	
"Piece by Piece" †	Kelly Clarkson	Kelly Clarkson; Greg Kurstin	Piece by Piece	2015	
"Ready"	Kelly Clarkson	Kelly Clarkson; Jason Halbert; Aben Eubanks	All I Ever Wanted	2009	
"Red Flag Collector" #	Kelly Clarkson	Kelly Clarkson; Jason Halbert; Jaco Caraco	Chemistry	2023	
"River Rose's Magical Lullaby" #	Kelly Clarkson	Kelly Clarkson	River Rose and the Magical Lullaby	2016	
"Rock Hudson"	Kelly Clarkson	Kelly Clarkson; Jesse Shatkin	Chemistry	2023	
"Roses" #	Kelly Clarkson	Kelly Clarkson; Jesse Shatkin; Sean Douglas; Amy Allen	Chemistry	2023	
"Santa, Can't You Hear Me" †	Kelly Clarkson; Ariana Grande	Kelly Clarkson; Aben Eubanks	When Christmas Comes Around...	2021	
"Skip This Part"	Kelly Clarkson	Kelly Clarkson; Jason Halbert	Chemistry	2023	
"Sober" †	Kelly Clarkson	Kelly Clarkson; Jimmy Messer; Aben Eubanks; Clamity McEntire	My December	2007	
"Something I Never Had"	Lindsay Lohan	Kelly Clarkson; John Shanks; Shelly Peiken	Speak	2004	
"Standing in Front of You"	Kelly Clarkson	Kelly Clarkson; Aben Eubanks	Stronger	2011	
"Survivor's Remorse" † (Note: "Survivor's Remorse" samples "Me".)	Roddy Ricch	Kelly Clarkson; Chandler Great; Gayle; Omar Perrin; Roddy Ricch; Josh Ronen	The Navy Album	2024	
"Tell Me a Lie"	One Direction	Kelly Clarkson; Tom Meredith; Sheppard Solomon	Up All Night	2011	
"Thankful"	Kelly Clarkson	Kelly Clarkson; Kenneth "Babyface" Edmonds; Harvey Mason Jr. Damon Thomas	Thankful	2003	
"That's Right"	Kelly Clarkson; Sheila E.	Kelly Clarkson; Jesse Shatkin; Erik Serna	Chemistry	2023	
"Tightrope"	Kelly Clarkson	Kelly Clarkson; Greg Kurstin	Piece by Piece	2015	
"Tip of My Tongue"	Kelly Clarkson	Kelly Clarkson; Ryan Tedder	All I Ever Wanted	2009	
"The Trouble With Love Is" †	Kelly Clarkson	Kelly Clarkson; Evan Rogers; Carl Sturken	Thankful	2003	
"Trying to Help You Out"	Ashley Arrison	Kelly Clarkson; Ashley Arrison	Hearts on Parade	2010	
"Under the Mistletoe" †	Kelly Clarkson; Brett Eldredge	Kelly Clarkson; Aben Eubanks	—N/a	2020	
"Underneath the Tree" †	Kelly Clarkson	Kelly Clarkson; Greg Kurstin	Wrapped in Red	2013	
"Walk Away" †	Kelly Clarkson	Kelly Clarkson; Kara DioGuardi; Chantal Kreviazuk; Raine Maida	Breakaway	2004	
"Where Is Your Heart"	Kelly Clarkson	Kelly Clarkson; Kara DioGuardi; Chantal Kreviazuk	Breakaway	2004	
"Where Have You Been" †	Kelly Clarkson	Kelly Clarkson; Jaco Caraco	—N/a	2025	
"Whole Lotta Woman"	Kelly Clarkson	Kelly Clarkson; Jussi Karvinen; Denisia "Blu June" Andrews; Brittany "Chi" Coney; Evon Barnes Jr. Jesse Shatkin	Meaning of Life	2017	
"Winter Dreams (Brandon's Song)"	Kelly Clarkson	Kelly Clarkson; Ashley Arrison; Aben Eubanks	Wrapped in Red	2013	
"Would You Call That Love"	Kelly Clarkson	Kelly Clarkson; Greg Kurstin	Meaning of Life	2017	
"Wrapped in Red" †	Kelly Clarkson	Kelly Clarkson; Ashley Arrison; Aben Eubanks; Shane McAnally	Wrapped in Red	2013	
"Yeah"	Kelly Clarkson	Kelly Clarkson; Jimmy Messer; Malcolm Pardon; Fredrick Rinman	My December	2007	
"You Can't Win"	Kelly Clarkson	Kelly Clarkson; Josh Abraham; Oliver Goldstein; Felix Bloxsom	Stronger	2011	
"You Don't Make Me Cry"	Kelly Clarkson; River Rose	Kelly Clarkson; Jesse Shatkin	Chemistry	2023	
"You For Christmas" †	Kelly Clarkson	Kelly Clarkson; Mark Ronson; Andrew Wyatt	When Christmas Comes Around...	2024	
"You Love Me"	Kelly Clarkson	Kelly Clarkson; Josh Abraham; Oliver Goldstein	Stronger	2011	
"You Thought Wrong"	Kelly Clarkson; Tamyra Gray	Kelly Clarkson; Tamyra Gray; Kenneth "Babyface" Edmonds; Harvey Mason Jr. Damon Thomas	Thankful	2003	
