= Kelly Clarkson discography =

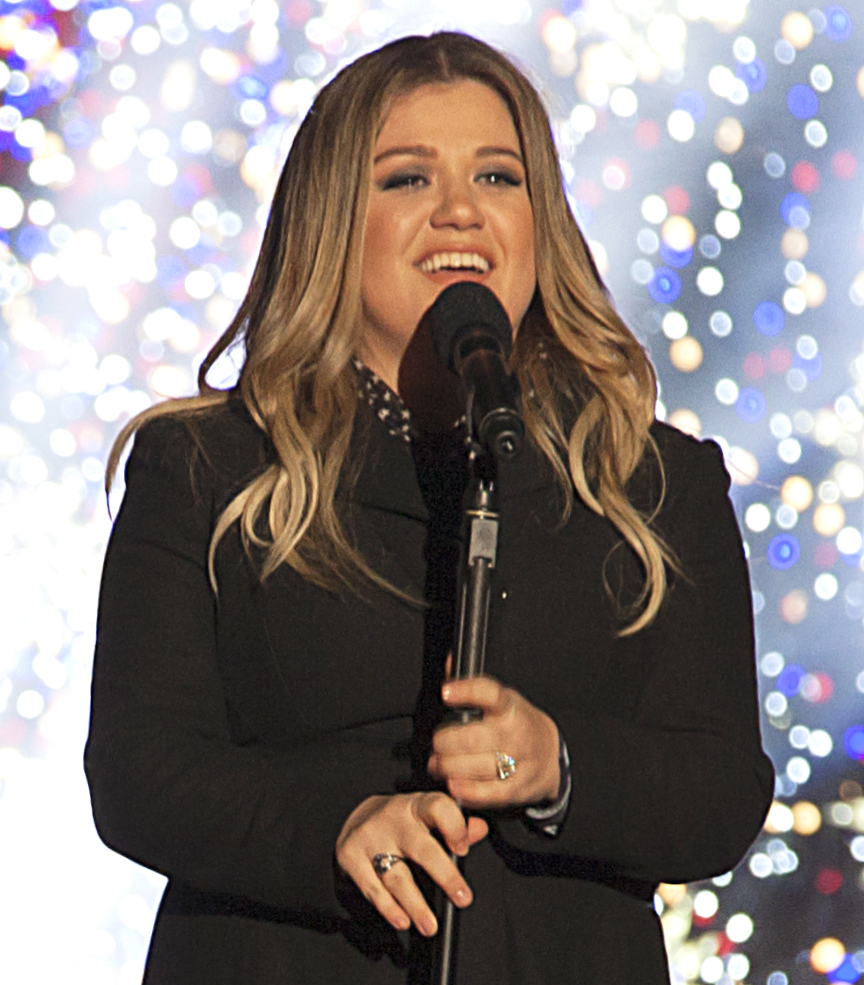
- Clarkson at the 2016 National Christmas Tree Lighting.
- Studio albums: 10
- Extended plays: 8
- Compilation albums: 1
- Singles: 56
- Remix albums: 1
- Promotional singles: 27
- Other appearances: 25

American singer-songwriter Kelly Clarkson has released ten studio albums, eight extended plays, one compilation album, one remix album and 56 singles (including eight as a featured artist). In 2002, she won the inaugural season of the television competition American Idol and was immediately signed to a recording deal with 19 Recordings, and RCA Records. (Note: Prior to the selection of the first American Idol winner in 2002, Clarkson signed a recording contract with 19 Recordings, which will reserve the phonographic rights to the master recordings commissioned throughout the indenture. 19 then entered into a "master agreement" with Simon Cowell's S Records (trading as Ronagold Limited) to appoint its affiliate RCA Records the exclusive license to distribute these recordings. An amendment in 2005 extended S to participate as 19's partner for five years, after which the license were directly given to RCA for the rest of the deal's duration.) She made her chart debut in September 2002 with the double A-side single "Before Your Love"/"A Moment Like This", latter of which topped the Billboard Hot 100 chart (Note: Following a revision of its methodology of gauging the Billboard Hot 100 chart in 1999, sales of singles with more than one current song will be given to the track which currently receives the most radio airplay. In the case of "Before Your Love"/"A Moment Like This", the latter received the most radio airplay detection and was credited on the Billboard Hot 100 chart, though "Before Your Love" was also deemed eligible to enter independently had it gained enough radio audience at the time.) and eventually became the year's best-selling single in the United States. Her debut album, Thankful, was released in April 2003 and entered the US Billboard 200 chart at number one. Thankful produced the hit lead single "Miss Independent" and was certified double-platinum by the Recording Industry Association of America (RIAA).

Released in 2004, Clarkson's second studio album Breakaway expanded her audience to international markets and currently remains as her most successful album to date with sales of 12 million copies worldwide. Aided by the commercial successes of its worldwide hit singles "Since U Been Gone", "Behind These Hazel Eyes", "Because of You", "Walk Away", and "Breakaway", Breakaway topped the Irish Albums Chart and the Dutch Album Top 100 chart and became the world's seventh best-selling album of 2005, according to the International Federation of the Phonographic Industry (IFPI). Clarkson released her third studio album My December in 2007 amidst a highly publicized dispute with music mogul Clive Davis. Though its commercial performance paled in comparison to its predecessor's, it spawned the hit single "Never Again" and was eventually certified platinum by the RIAA. In 2009, she released her fourth studio album All I Ever Wanted, which became her second number one entry on Billboard 200 chart. Its lead single "My Life Would Suck Without You" currently maintains the record of the biggest jump to number one in the history of the Billboard Hot 100 chart, and was followed by the hit singles "I Do Not Hook Up" and "Already Gone".

In 2011, Clarkson released her fifth studio album Stronger, accompanied by the hit singles "Mr. Know It All" and "Stronger (What Doesn't Kill You)". Stronger was certified platinum by the RIAA, fueled by the success of "Stronger (What Doesn't Kill You)", which currently stands as her most successful single with number one peak positions on sixteen Billboard charts, including the Billboard Hot 100 chart. In 2012, Clarkson commemorated her tenth career anniversary with her first greatest hits compilation, Greatest Hits – Chapter One. Accompanied by its hit lead single "Catch My Breath", Chapter One was certified gold by the RIAA. Released in 2013, her sixth studio album and first Christmas record Wrapped in Red became that year's best-selling holiday album in the United States. Its lead single "Underneath the Tree" recurrently charts as a popular Christmas hit song every holiday season since its release.

Clarkson completed her recording contract with 19 and RCA with the release of her seventh studio album Piece by Piece in 2015. Certified gold by the RIAA, it became her third number one album on Billboard 200 chart and produced the hit singles "Heartbeat Song" and "Piece by Piece", the latter of which celebrated her milestone 100th number one listing on the Billboard charts. A year later, she signed a long-term recording contract with Atlantic Records. Her first record on the label and her eighth studio album Meaning of Life was released in 2017 and produced the hit single "Love So Soft". This was followed by her second Christmas album, When Christmas Comes Around... in 2021, accompanied by the single "Christmas Isn't Canceled (Just You)". In 2023, Clarkson released her tenth studio album, Chemistry, which included the lead singles "Mine" and "Me". To date, Clarkson has sold over 35 million albums and 110 million singles worldwide and has sold over 18.6 million album-equivalent units (including 14.6 million in traditional album sales), 35 million digital tracks, 61 billion in cumulative radio audience, and 2.8 billion on-demand streams.

== Albums ==
=== Studio albums ===
List of albums, with selected chart positions, sales and certifications
| Title | Album details | Peak chart positions | | | | | | | | | | Sales | Certifications |
| Title | Album details | US | AUS | AUT | CAN | GER | IRL | NLD | NZ | SWI | UK | Sales | Certifications |
|---|---|---|---|---|---|---|---|---|---|---|---|---|---|
| Thankful | Released: April 15, 2003; Label: RCA, 19, S; Format: Cassette, CD, digital download | 1 | 33 | — | 5 | — | 46 | 83 | — | — | 41 | US: 2,800,000; UK: 155,343 | RIAA: 2× Platinum; ARIA: Gold; BPI: Gold; MC: Platinum |
| Breakaway | Released: November 30, 2004; Label: RCA, 19, S; Format: Cassette, CD, CD+DVD, LP, digital download | 3 | 2 | 3 | 6 | 4 | 1 | 1 | 5 | 2 | 3 | US: 6,400,000; UK: 1,606,963 | RIAA: 6× Platinum; ARIA: 7× Platinum; BPI: 5× Platinum; BVMI: 2× Platinum; IFPI AUT: Gold; IFPI SWI: Platinum; IRMA: 7× Platinum; MC: 5× Platinum; NVPI: Gold; RMNZ: 4× Platinum |
| My December | Released: June 22, 2007; Label: RCA, 19; Format: Cassette, CD, digital download | 2 | 4 | 8 | 2 | 5 | 2 | 7 | 8 | 5 | 2 | US: 858,000; UK: 156,637 | RIAA: Platinum; ARIA: Gold; BPI: Gold; IRMA: Gold; MC: Platinum |
| All I Ever Wanted | Released: March 6, 2009; Label: RCA, 19; Format: CD, CD+DVD, digital download | 1 | 2 | 4 | 2 | 4 | 4 | 6 | 6 | 7 | 3 | US: 1,004,000; UK: 205,594 | ARIA: Platinum; BPI: Gold; IRMA: Gold; MC: Platinum |
| Stronger | Released: October 21, 2011; Label: RCA, 19; Format: CD, digital download | 2 | 3 | 20 | 4 | 14 | 8 | 16 | 6 | 12 | 5 | US: 1,129,000; UK: 275,227 | RIAA: Platinum; ARIA: Platinum; BPI: Gold; MC: Platinum; RMNZ: Gold |
| Wrapped in Red | Released: October 25, 2013; Label: RCA; Format: CD, LP, CD+DVD, digital download | 3 | 29 | — | 5 | 10 | 64 | 6 | — | 97 | 65 | US: 1,500,000 (Note: In album-equivalent units, which are now being gauged as the industry standard following MRC's acquisition of Nielsen Soundscan as MRC Data in 2019.); UK: 22,000 | RIAA: Platinum; MC: Platinum |
| Piece by Piece | Released: February 27, 2015; Label: RCA, 19; Format: CD, LP, box set, digital download | 1 | 5 | 27 | 4 | 30 | 8 | 18 | 12 | 29 | 6 | US: 284,000; UK: 60,000 | RIAA: Gold; BPI: Silver; RMNZ: Gold |
| Meaning of Life | Released: October 27, 2017; Label: Atlantic; Format: CD, LP, digital download, streaming | 2 | 6 | 27 | 4 | 32 | 18 | 35 | 21 | 19 | 11 | US: 68,000; UK: 15,000 | RIAA: Gold |
| When Christmas Comes Around... | Released: October 15, 2021; Label: Atlantic; Format: CD, LP, digital download, streaming | 22 | 61 | — | 31 | 42 | — | 26 | 19 | 41 | 94 | US: 93,000 (Note: In album-equivalent units, which are now being gauged as the industry standard following MRC's acquisition of Nielsen Soundscan as MRC Data in 2019.) | |
| Chemistry | Released: June 23, 2023; Label: Atlantic; Format: CD, LP, digital download, streaming | 6 | 31 | — | 15 | 81 | — | — | — | 36 | 34 | US: 53,000 | |
"—" denotes a recording that did not chart in that territory.

=== Compilation albums ===
List of albums, with selected chart positions, sales and certifications
| Title | Album details | Peak chart positions | | | | | | | Sales | Certifications |
| Title | Album details | US | AUS | CAN | IRL | NZ | SWI | UK | Sales | Certifications |
|---|---|---|---|---|---|---|---|---|---|---|
| Greatest Hits – Chapter One | Released: November 16, 2012; Label: RCA, 19; Format: CD, CD+DVD, digital download | 11 | 20 | 15 | 21 | 15 | 92 | 18 | US: 728,000; UK: 249,784 | RIAA: Gold; ARIA: Platinum; BPI: Platinum; RMNZ: 2× Platinum |

=== Remix albums ===
List of remix albums with relevant details
| Title | EP details | Peak chart positions | Sales |
| Title | EP details | US Dance | Sales |
|---|---|---|---|
| Piece by Piece Remixed | Released: March 4, 2016; Label: RCA, 19; Format: Digital download | 1 | US: 2,000 |

== Extended plays ==
List of extended plays with relevant details
| Title | EP details | Peak chart positions | | Sales |
| Title | EP details | US | UK DL | Sales |
|---|---|---|---|---|
| Rolling Stone Original | Released: January 1, 2005; Label: RCA, 19; Format: Digital download | — | — | |
| Nissan Live Sets at Yahoo! Music | Released: July 17, 2007; Label: RCA, 19; Format: Digital download | — | — | |
| The Smoakstack Sessions | Released: October 24, 2011; Label: RCA, 19; Format: CD | — | — | |
| iTunes Session | Released: December 23, 2011; Label: RCA, 19; Format: Digital download | 85 | — | US: 17,000 |
| The Smoakstack Sessions Vol. 2 | Released: November 19, 2012; Label: RCA, 19; Format: CD, streaming | — | — | |
| Kelly Clarkson Live | Released: December 9, 2016; Label: Atlantic; Format: Digital download | — | — | |
| Kellyoke | Released: June 9, 2022; Label: Atlantic; Format: CD, Digital download | — (Note: Kellyoke did not enter the Billboard 200 but peaked at number 47 on the Top Album Sales chart.) | 50 | |
| Christmastry | Released: November 22, 2023; Label: Atlantic; Format: Digital download | — | – | |
"—" denotes a recording that did not chart in that territory.

== Singles ==
=== As lead artist ===
List of singles as lead artist, with selected chart positions and certifications, showing year released and album name
| Title | Year | Peak chart positions | | | | | | | | | | Certifications | Album |
| Title | Year | US | AUS | AUT | CAN | GER | IRL | NLD | NZ | SWI | UK | Certifications | Album |
|---|---|---|---|---|---|---|---|---|---|---|---|---|---|
| "Before Your Love" | 2002 | — | — | — | — | — | — | — | — | — | — | RIAA: Gold; MC: 2× Platinum | Non-album singles |
| "A Moment Like This" | 2002 | 1 | — | — | — | — | — | — | — | — | — (Note: "A Moment Like This" did not enter the UK Singles Chart, but peaked at number 56 on the Official UK Singles Downloads Chart.) | RIAA: Gold; MC: 2× Platinum | Non-album singles |
| "Miss Independent" | 2003 | 9 | 3 | 39 | — | 52 | 11 | 27 | — | 44 | 6 | RIAA: Gold; ARIA: Gold | Thankful |
| "Low" | 2003 | 58 | 11 | — | 2 | — | — | — | — | — | 35 (Note: "Low" and "The Trouble with Love Is" charted simultaneously at the Official UK Singles Chart as a double-A side single.) | ARIA: Gold | Thankful |
| "The Trouble with Love Is" | 2003 | — (Note: "The Trouble with Love Is" did not enter the Billboard Hot 100, but peaked at number 1 on the Bubbling Under Hot 100 Singles chart.) | 11 | — | 25 | 42 | — | 26 | — | 62 | 35 | ARIA: Gold | Thankful and Love Actually |
| "Breakaway" | 2004 | 6 | 10 | 8 | 12 | 13 | 12 | 30 | 12 | 14 | 22 | RIAA: Gold; ARIA: Gold; BPI: Platinum; MC: Gold; RMNZ: Platinum | The Princess Diaries 2: Royal Engagement - Original Soundtrack and Breakaway |
| "Since U Been Gone" | 2004 | 2 | 3 | 3 | 2 | 6 | 4 | 10 | 11 | 7 | 5 | RIAA: Platinum; ARIA: Platinum; BPI: 3× Platinum; BVMI: Gold; MC: Platinum; RMNZ: 4× Platinum | Breakaway |
| "Behind These Hazel Eyes" | 2005 | 6 | 6 | 9 | 4 | 16 | 4 | 15 | 7 | 20 | 9 | RIAA: Platinum; BPI: Silver; MC: Platinum; RMNZ: Gold | Breakaway |
| "Because of You" | 2005 | 7 | 4 | 3 | 2 | 4 | 5 | 1 | 19 | 1 | 7 | RIAA: Platinum; ARIA: Gold; BPI: 2× Platinum; BVMI: Gold; MC: Gold; RMNZ: 2× Platinum | Breakaway |
| "Walk Away" | 2006 | 12 | 27 | 29 | 7 | 30 | 10 | — | 19 | 58 | 21 | RIAA: Gold; MC: Gold | Breakaway |
| "Never Again" | 2007 | 8 | 5 | 36 | 8 | 19 | 11 | 38 | 20 | 27 | 9 | RIAA: Gold; ARIA: Gold; MC: Gold | My December |
| "Because of You" (with Reba McEntire) | 2007 | 50 | — | — | 36 | — | — | — | — | — | — | RIAA: Platinum | Reba: Duets |
| "Sober" | 2007 | — (Note: "Sober" did not enter the Billboard Hot 100, but peaked at number 10 on the Bubbling Under Hot 100 Singles chart.) | — | — | — | — | — | — | — | — | — | | My December |
| "One Minute" | 2007 | — | 36 | — | — | — | — | — | — | — | — | | My December |
| "Don't Waste Your Time" | 2007 | — | — | — | — | 93 | — | — | — | — | — | | My December |
| "My Life Would Suck Without You" | 2009 | 1 | 5 | 6 | 1 | 6 | 4 | 5 | 11 | 5 | 1 | ARIA: Platinum; BPI: Platinum; BVMI: Gold; MC: 2× Platinum; RMNZ: Platinum | All I Ever Wanted |
| "I Do Not Hook Up" | 2009 | 20 | 9 | 68 | 13 | 55 | 30 | 97 | 31 | — | 36 | ARIA: Gold; MC: Gold | All I Ever Wanted |
| "Already Gone" | 2009 | 13 | 12 | 37 | 15 | 23 | — | 78 | 23 | 15 | 66 | ARIA: Gold; MC: Gold | All I Ever Wanted |
| "All I Ever Wanted" | 2010 | 96 | — | — | — | — | — | — | — | — | — | | All I Ever Wanted |
| "Cry" | 2010 | — | — | — | — | — | — | — | — | — | — | | All I Ever Wanted |
| "Don't You Wanna Stay" (with Jason Aldean) | 2010 | 31 | — | — | 35 | — | — | — | — | — | — | RIAA: 3× Platinum | My Kinda Party |
| "Mr. Know It All" | 2011 | 10 | 1 | 26 | 11 | 18 | 14 | 90 | 8 | 22 | 4 | ARIA: 3× Platinum; BPI: Gold; MC: Platinum; RMNZ: Platinum | Stronger |
| "I'll Be Home for Christmas" | 2011 | 93 | — | — | — | — | — | — | — | — | — | | iTunes Session |
| "Stronger (What Doesn't Kill You)" | 2012 | 1 | 18 | 6 | 3 | 27 | 4 | 59 | 4 | 18 | 8 | RIAA: 7× Platinum; ARIA: 3× Platinum; BPI: 2× Platinum; IFPI AUT: Gold; MC: Platinum; RMNZ: 3× Platinum | Stronger |
| "Dark Side" | 2012 | 42 | 56 | — | 26 | 82 | 42 | — | — | — | 40 | | Stronger |
| "Catch My Breath" | 2012 | 19 | 40 | 67 | 22 | 89 | 88 | — | — | — | 51 | | Greatest Hits – Chapter One |
| "Don't Rush" (featuring Vince Gill) | 2012 | 87 | — | — | 53 | — | — | — | — | — | — | | Greatest Hits – Chapter One |
| "People Like Us" | 2013 | 65 | 46 | — | 28 | — | — | — | 25 | — | 188 | | Greatest Hits – Chapter One |
| "Tie It Up" | 2013 | — (Note: "Tie It Up" did not enter the Billboard Hot 100, but peaked at number 12 on the Bubbling Under Hot 100 Singles chart.) | — | — | 79 | — | — | — | — | — | — | | Non-album single |
| "Underneath the Tree" | 2013 | 7 | 6 | 6 | 6 | 5 | 7 | 5 | 6 | 8 | 5 | ARIA: 2× Platinum; BPI: 4× Platinum; BVMI: Platinum; RMNZ: Platinum | Wrapped in Red |
| "Wrapped in Red" | 2014 | — | — | — | — | — | — | — | — | — | — | | Wrapped in Red |
| "Heartbeat Song" | 2015 | 21 | 29 | 8 | 23 | 16 | 23 | 71 | 21 | 24 | 7 | RIAA: Platinum; ARIA: Gold; BPI: Platinum; BVMI: Gold; RMNZ: Platinum | Piece by Piece |
| "Invincible" | 2015 | — | — | — | — | — | — | — | — | — | 141 | | Piece by Piece |
| "Piece by Piece" | 2015 | 8 | 24 | — | 17 | — | — | — | — | — | 27 | BPI: Gold; RMNZ: Platinum | Piece by Piece |
| "Love So Soft" | 2017 | 47 | 88 | — | 73 | — | — | — | — (Note: "Love So Soft" did not enter the NZ Top 40 Singles Chart, but peaked at number 3 on the NZ Heatseekers Singles Chart.) | — | 81 | RIAA: Platinum; MC: Gold | Meaning of Life |
| "Christmas Eve" (Note: "Christmas Eve" was originally released as a non-album single but was later included on When Christmas Comes Around...) | 2017 | — | — | 72 | — | 64 | — | — | — | — | — | | Non-album single |
| "I Don't Think About You" | 2018 | — (Note: "I Don't Think About You" peaked at number 32 on the Billboard Digital Song Sales chart, which is a component chart of the Billboard Hot 100.) | — | — | — | — | — | — | — | — | — | | Meaning of Life |
| "Heat" | 2018 | — | — | — | — | — | — | — | — | — | — | | Meaning of Life |
| "Broken & Beautiful" | 2019 | — (Note: "Broken & Beautiful" did not enter the Billboard Hot 100, but peaked at number 6 on the Bubbling Under Hot 100 Singles chart.) | — (Note: "Broken & Beautiful" did not enter the ARIA Singles Chart, but peaked at number 48 on the Australia Digital Tracks Chart.) | — | — (Note: "Broken & Beautiful" did not enter the Canadian Hot 100, but peaked at number 23 on the Canada Digital Song Sales chart.) | — | — | — | — (Note: "Broken & Beautiful" did not enter the NZ Top 40 Singles Chart, but peaked at number 35 on the NZ Hot Singles Chart.) | — | — | RIAA: Gold; BPI: Silver; RMNZ: Gold | UglyDolls |
| "I Dare You" | 2020 | 86 | — (Note: "I Dare You" did not enter the ARIA Singles Chart, but peaked at number 29 on the Australia Digital Tracks Chart.) | — | 89 | — (Note: "I Dare You" did not enter the Germany Singles Chart, but peaked at number 56 on the Official German Downloads Chart.) | — | — | — (Note: "I Dare You" did not enter the NZ Top 40 Singles Chart, but peaked at number 38 on the NZ Hot 40 Singles Chart.) | — | — (Note: "I Dare You" did not enter the UK Singles Chart, but peaked at number 47 on the UK Singles Sales Chart.) | | Non-album singles |
| "Under the Mistletoe" (Note: "Under the Mistletoe" was originally released as a non-album single but was later included on When Christmas Comes Around...) (with Brett Eldredge) | 2020 | 59 | — | — | 68 | — | 58 | — | — | — | 61 | | Non-album singles |
| "Christmas Isn't Canceled (Just You)" | 2021 | 79 | — | — | — | — | — | — | — (Note: "Christmas Isn't Canceled (Just You)" did not enter the NZ Top 40 Singles Chart, but peaked at number 40 on the NZ Hot 40 Singles Chart.) | — | — | | When Christmas Comes Around... |
| "Santa, Can't You Hear Me" (with Ariana Grande) | 2022 | 31 | 38 | 30 | 37 | 26 | 13 | 50 | 35 | 26 | 23 | BPI: Gold; RMNZ: Gold | When Christmas Comes Around... |
| "Mine" | 2023 | — (Note: "Mine" did not enter the Billboard Hot 100, but peaked at number 10 on the Digital Song Sales chart.) | — | — | — (Note: "Mine" did not enter the Canadian Hot 100, but peaked at number 15 on the Canadian Digital Song Sales chart.) | — | — | — | — (Note: "Mine" did not enter the NZ Top 40 Singles Chart, but peaked at number 36 on the NZ Hot Singles Chart.) | — | — (Note: "Mine" did not enter the UK Singles Chart, but peaked at number 35 on the UK Singles Sales Chart.) | | Chemistry |
| "Me" | 2023 | — (Note: "Me" did not enter the Billboard Hot 100, but peaked at number 6 on the Digital Song Sales chart.) | — | — | — (Note: "Me" did not enter the Canadian Hot 100, but peaked at number 16 on the Canada Digital Song Sales chart.) | — | — | — | — | — | — (Note: "Me" did not enter the UK Singles Chart, but peaked at number 43 on the UK Singles Sales Chart.) | | Chemistry |
| "Favorite Kind of High" | 2023 | — | — | — | — | — | — | — | — | — | — | | Chemistry |
| "Lighthouse"/"I Won't Give Up" | 2024 | — | — | — | — | — | — | — | — | — | — | | Chemistry |
| "From the Jump" (with James Arthur) | 2024 | — | — | — | — | — | — | — | — (Note: "From the Jump" did not enter the NZ Top 40 Singles Chart, but peaked at number 37 on the NZ Hot Singles Chart.) | — | — | | Bitter Sweet Love (Deluxe) |
| "You for Christmas" | 2024 | — | — | — | — | — | — | — | — (Note: "You for Christmas" did not enter the NZ Top 40 Singles Chart, but peaked at number 13 on the NZ Hot Singles Chart.) | — | — | | When Christmas Comes Around...Again |
| "Where Have You Been" | 2025 | — (Note: "Where Have You Been" did not enter the Billboard Hot 100, but peaked at number 2 on the Digital Song Sales chart.) | — (Note: "Where Have You Been" did not enter the ARIA Singles Chart, but peaked at number 24 on the Australia Digital Tracks Chart.) | — | — | — | — | — | — | — | — (Note: "Where Have You Been" did not enter the UK Singles Chart, but peaked at number 54 on the UK Singles Sales Chart.) | | Non-album singles |
| "I'd Be Lyin'" | 2026 | — (Note: "I'd Be Lyin'" did not enter the Billboard Hot 100, but peaked at number 7 on the Digital Song Sales chart.) | — | — | — (Note: "I'd Be Lyin'" did not enter the Canadian Hot 100, but peaked at number 18 on the Canada Digital Song Sales chart.) | — | — | — | — | — | — (Note: "I'd Be Lyin'" did not enter the UK Singles Chart, but peaked at number 52 on the UK Singles Sales Chart.) | | Non-album singles |
"—" denotes a recording that did not chart in that territory.

=== As featured artist ===
List of singles as featured artist, with selected chart positions, showing year charted, certifications and album name
| Title | Year | Peak chart positions | | | | Certifications | Album |
| Title | Year | US Cou. | IRL | NLD | UK | Certifications | Album |
|---|---|---|---|---|---|---|---|
| "PrizeFighter" (Trisha Yearwood featuring Kelly Clarkson) | 2014 | — (Note: "PrizeFighter" did not enter the Hot Country Songs chart but peaked at number 46 on the Country Airplay component chart.) | — | — | — | | PrizeFighter: Hit After Hit |
| "Second Hand Heart" (Ben Haenow featuring Kelly Clarkson) | 2015 | — | 56 | — (Note: "Second Hand Heart" peaked at number four on the Dutch Top 40 Tipparade, which ranks the top 30 songs that have not yet entered the main Dutch Top 40 chart.) | 21 | BPI: Silver | Ben Haenow |
| "This Is for My Girls" (as part of Artists for Let Girls Learn) | 2016 | — | — | — | — | | Non-album single |
| "Softly and Tenderly" (Reba McEntire featuring Kelly Clarkson and Trisha Yearwood) | 2016 | — | — | — | — | | Sing It Now: Songs of Faith & Hope |
| "I Dream in Southern" (Kaleb Lee featuring Kelly Clarkson) | 2019 | — (Note: "I Dream in Southern" did not enter the Hot Country Songs chart but peaked at number 17 on the Country Digital Song Sales component chart.) | — | — | — | | Non-album single |
| "I Would've Loved You" (Jake Hoot featuring Kelly Clarkson) | 2021 | — (Note: "I Would've Loved You" did not enter the Hot Country Songs chart but peaked at number five on the Country Digital Song Sales component chart.) | — | — | — | | Love Out of Time |
| "You're Drunk, Go Home" (Kelsea Ballerini with Kelly Clarkson and Carly Pearce) | 2022 | — (Note: "You're Drunk, Go Home" did not enter the Hot Country Songs chart but peaked at number 22 on the Country Digital Song Sales component chart.) | — | — | — | | Subject to Change |
| "Don't Fence Me In" (Jeff Goldblum and The Mildred Snitzer Orchestra featuring Kelly Clarkson) | 2023 | — | — | — | — | | Plays Well With Others |
| "If I Were You" (Terri Clark featuring Kelly Clarkson) | 2024 | — | — | — | — | | Take Two |
| "Sweet December" (Brett Eldredge featuring Kelly Clarkson) | 2024 | — | — | — | — | | Merry Christmas (Welcome to the Family) |
| "I'm Movin' On" (Rascal Flatts featuring Kelly Clarkson) | 2025 | — | — | — | — | | Life Is a Highway: Refueled Duets |
"—" denotes a recording that did not chart in that territory.

=== Promotional singles ===
List of promotional singles, with selected chart positions, showing year charted, certifications and album name
| Title | Year | Peak chart positions | | | | | Certifications | Album |
| Title | Year | US | US Cou. | AUS | CAN | UK | Certifications | Album |
|---|---|---|---|---|---|---|---|---|
| "Addicted" | 2005 | — | — | — | — | — | | Breakaway |
| "Go" | 2006 | — | — | — | — | — | | Non-album singles |
| "Up to the Mountain" (featuring Jeff Beck) | 2007 | 56 | — | — | — | — | | Non-album singles |
| "Get Up (A Cowboys Anthem)" | 2012 | — | — | — | — | — | | Non-album singles |
| "White Christmas" | 2013 | — | — | — | — | — | | Wrapped in Red |
| "Run Run Run" (featuring John Legend) | 2015 | — | — | — | — | — | | Piece by Piece |
| "Take You High" | 2015 | — | — | — | — | — | | Piece by Piece |
| "Someone" | 2015 | — | — | — | — | — | | Piece by Piece |
| "River Rose's Magical Lullaby" | 2016 | — | — | — | — | — | | Non-album single |
| "It's Quiet Uptown" | 2016 | — (Note: "It's Quiet Uptown" peaked at number 24 on the Billboard Bubbling Under Hot 100 chart, which ranks the top 25 songs that have not yet entered the Billboard Hot 100.) | — | — | — | — | | The Hamilton Mixtape |
| "Move You" | 2017 | — (Note: "Move You" peaked at number 56 on the Billboard Digital Song Sales chart, which is a component chart of the Billboard Hot 100.) | — | — | — | — (Note: "Move You" peaked at number 181 on the Official UK Singles Downloads Chart, which is a component chart of the Official UK Singles Chart.) | | Meaning of Life |
| "Meaning of Life" | 2017 | — | — | — | — | — | | Meaning of Life |
| "I've Loved You Since Forever" (Hoda Kotb + Kelly Clarkson) | 2018 | — (Note: "I've Loved You Since Forever" peaked at number 35 on the Billboard Digital Song Sales chart, which is a component chart of the Billboard Hot 100.) | — | — | — | — | | Non-album single |
| "Don't Dream It's Over" (with Brynn Cartelli) | 2018 | — | — | — | — | — | | The Complete Season 14 Collection |
| "Keeping Score" (Dan + Shay featuring Kelly Clarkson) | 2018 | — (Note: "Keeping Score" peaked at number 30 on the Billboard Digital Song Sales chart, which is a component chart of the Billboard Hot 100.) | — (Note: "Keeping Score" peaked at number 37 on the Billboard Hot Canadian Digital Song Sales chart, which is a component chart of the Billboard Canadian Hot 100.) | — | — | — | RIAA: Gold; MC: Gold | Dan + Shay |
| "Never Enough" | 2018 | — (Note: "Never Enough" peaked at number 14 on the Billboard Digital Song Sales chart, which is a component chart of the Billboard Hot 100.) | — | — | — | 59 | | The Greatest Showman: Reimagined |
| "Rockin' with the Rhythm of the Rain" (with Chevel Shepherd) | 2018 | — (Note: "Rockin' with the Rhythm of the Rain" peaked at number 48 on the Billboard Digital Song Sales chart, which is a component chart of the Billboard Hot 100.) | — (Note: "Rockin' with the Rhythm of the Rain" did not enter the Hot Country Songs chart but peaked at number ten on the Country Digital Song Sales component chart.) | — | — | — | | The Complete Season 15 Collection |
| "Wintersong" (with Jake Hoot) | 2019 | — (Note: "Wintersong" peaked at number five on the Billboard Digital Song Sales chart, which is a component chart of the Billboard Hot 100.) | 30 | — (Note: "Wintersong" peaked at number 16 on the Billboard Hot Canadian Digital Song Sales chart, which is a component chart of the Billboard Canadian Hot 100.) | — | — | | The Complete Season 17 Collection |
| "I Run to You" (with Micah Iverson) | 2020 | — | — | — | — | — | | The Complete Season 18 Collection |
| "All I Want for Christmas Is You" (Note: "All I Want for Christmas Is You" was originally released as a non-album single but was later included on When Christmas Comes Around...) | 2020 | — | — | — | — | — | | Non-album single |
| "When You Say Nothing at All" (with Kenzie Wheeler) | 2021 | — | — | — | — | — | | The Complete Season 20 Collection |
| "Glow" (with Chris Stapleton) | 2021 | — | — | — | — | — | | When Christmas Comes Around... |
| "Happier Than Ever" | 2022 | — | — | — | — | — | | Kellyoke |
| "9 to 5" (with Dolly Parton) | 2022 | — (Note: "9 to 5" peaked at number 15 on the Billboard Digital Song Sales chart, which is a component chart of the Billboard Hot 100.) | — (Note: "9 to 5" did not enter the Hot Country Songs chart but peaked at number six on the Country Digital Song Sales component chart.) | — | — (Note: "9 to 5" peaked at number 46 on the Billboard Hot Canadian Digital Song Sales chart, which is a component chart of the Billboard Canadian Hot 100.) | — | | Still Working 9 to 5 |
| "I Hate Love" (featuring Steve Martin) | 2023 | — | — | — | — | — | | Chemistry |
| "Red Flag Collector" | 2023 | — | — | — | — | — | | Chemistry |
| "Lighthouse" | 2023 | — | — | — | — | — | | Chemistry |
| "DJ Play a Christmas Song" (Remix) (with Cher) | 2024 | — | — | — | — | — | | Non-album single |
"—" denotes a recording that did not chart in that territory.

== Other charted songs ==
List of other charted songs, with selected chart positions, showing year charted and album name
| Title | Year | Peak chart positions | | | | | | | | Album |
| Title | Year | US | US AC | US Cou. | US Hol. Dig. | CAN | CAN AC | NZ | UK | Album |
|---|---|---|---|---|---|---|---|---|---|---|
| "My Grown Up Christmas List" | 2004 | — | 17 | — | 25 | — | — | — | — | American Idol: Great Holiday Classics |
| "If I Can't Have You" | 2009 | — (Note: "If I Can't Have You" peaked at number 18 on the Billboard Bubbling Under Hot 100 chart, which ranks the top 25 songs that have not yet entered the Billboard Hot 100 chart.) | — | — | — | — | — | — | — | All I Ever Wanted |
| "Beautiful Disaster" | 2011 | — | — | — | — | — | — | — | 124 | Thankful |
| "There's a New Kid in Town" (Blake Shelton featuring Kelly Clarkson) | 2013 | — | — | — (Note: "There's a New Kid in Town" did not enter the Hot Country Songs chart but peaked at number 44 on the Country Airplay component chart.) | — | — | — | — | — | Cheers, It's Christmas |
| "Have Yourself a Merry Little Christmas" | 2013 | — | — | – | 2 | — | — | — | — | Wrapped in Red |
| "Run Run Rudolph" | 2013 | — | — | – | 22 | — | — | — | — | Wrapped in Red |
| "Please Come Home for Christmas (Bells Are Ringing)" | 2013 | — | 6 | – | 14 | — | 14 | — | — | Wrapped in Red |
| "Blue Christmas" | 2013 | — | — | – | 27 | — | 5 | — | — | Wrapped in Red |
| "Winter Dreams (Brandon's Song)" | 2013 | — | — | – | 12 | — | — | — | — | Wrapped in Red |
| "My Favorite Things" | 2013 | — | — | – | 7 | — | 8 | — | — | Wrapped in Red |
| "4 Carats" | 2013 | — | — | – | 30 | — | — | — | — | Wrapped in Red |
| "Just for Now" | 2013 | — | — | – | 35 | — | — | — | — | Wrapped in Red |
| "Silent Night" (featuring Reba and Trisha Yearwood) | 2013 | — | — | – (Note: "Silent Night" did not enter the Hot Country Songs chart but peaked at number 39 on the Country Digital Song Sales component chart.) | 1 | — (Note: "Silent Night" peaked at number 74 on the Billboard Hot Canadian Digital Song Sales chart, which is a component chart of the Billboard Canadian Hot 100.) | 49 | — | — | Wrapped in Red |
| "Grown-Up Christmas List" (Pentatonix featuring Kelly Clarkson) | 2018 | — | 21 | – | 3 | — | — | — | — | Christmas Is Here! |
| "Baby, It's Cold Outside" (John Legend featuring Kelly Clarkson) | 2019 | — | — | — | 5 | — | 25 | — (Note: "Baby, It's Cold Outside" peaked at number 22 on the NZ Hot Singles Chart, which ranks the fastest-moving tracks in New Zealand.) | — | A Legendary Christmas |
| "Just Sing" (as part of Trolls World Tour cast) | 2020 | — (Note: "Just Sing" peaked at number 30 on the Billboard Digital Song Sales chart, which is a component chart of the Billboard Hot 100.) | — | — | — | — | — | — | — | Trolls World Tour: Original Motion Picture Soundtrack |
| "It's Beginning to Look a Lot Like Christmas" | 2022 | — | — | — | — | — | 32 | — | — | When Christmas Comes Around... |
| "Jingle Bell Rock" | 2022 | — | — | — | — | — | 31 | — | — | When Christmas Comes Around... |
"—" denotes a recording that did not chart in that territory.

== Other appearances ==
List of non-single appearances, showing year released, other performing artists and album name
| Title | Year | Other artist(s) | Album |
|---|---|---|---|
| "Respect" | 2002 | —N/a | American Idol: Greatest Moments |
| "(You Make Me Feel Like) A Natural Woman" | 2002 | —N/a | American Idol: Greatest Moments |
| "Oh, Holy Night" | 2003 | —N/a | American Idol: Great Holiday Classics |
| "My Grown Up Christmas List" | 2003 | —N/a | American Idol: Great Holiday Classics |
| "Timeless" | 2003 | Justin Guarini | Justin Guarini |
| "Trying to Help You Out" | 2010 | Ashley Arrison | Hearts on Parade |
| "There's a New Kid in Town" | 2012 | Blake Shelton | Cheers, It's Christmas |
| "Foolish Games" | 2013 | Jewel | Greatest Hits |
| "Little Green Apples" | 2013 | Robbie Williams | Swings Both Ways |
| "In the Basement" | 2014 | Martina McBride | Everlasting |
| "Pray for Peace" | 2015 | Reba McEntire | Love Somebody |
| "All I Ask of You" | 2015 | Josh Groban | Stages |
| "Love Goes On" | 2017 | Aloe Blacc | The Shack: Music from and Inspired by the Original Motion Picture |
| "Oh Holy Night" (Home Holiday Version) | 2017 | —N/a | Home for the Holidays |
| "Christmas is a Feeling" | 2017 | Ben Schwartz; Home cast | Home for the Holidays |
| "Grown-Up Christmas List" | 2018 | Pentatonix | Christmas Is Here! |
| "Couldn't Be Better" (Pop version) | 2019 | —N/a | UglyDolls: Original Motion Picture Soundtrack |
| "Today's the Day" | 2019 | —N/a | UglyDolls: Original Motion Picture Soundtrack |
| "Couldn't Be Better" (Movie version) | 2019 | UglyDolls cast | UglyDolls: Original Motion Picture Soundtrack |
| "Today's the (Perfect) Day" | 2019 | UglyDolls cast | UglyDolls: Original Motion Picture Soundtrack |
| "All Dolled Up" | 2019 | Janelle Monáe | UglyDolls: Original Motion Picture Soundtrack |
| "Unbreakable" | 2019 | Janelle Monáe | UglyDolls: Original Motion Picture Soundtrack |
| "Tell Me Something I Don't Know" | 2019 | Trisha Yearwood | Every Girl |
| "Born to Die" | 2020 | —N/a | Trolls World Tour: Original Motion Picture Soundtrack |
| "Just Sing (Trolls World Tour)" | 2020 | Trolls World Tour cast | Trolls World Tour: Original Motion Picture Soundtrack |

== See also ==
- Kelly Clarkson videography
