= Chemistry: An Intimate Evening with Kelly Clarkson =

Concert residency by Kelly Clarkson

- Residency by Kelly Clarkson
- Location: Paradise, Nevada, U.S.
- Venue: Bakkt Theater
- Associated album: Chemistry
- Start date: July 28, 2023
- End date: February 10, 2024
- Legs: 2
- No. of shows: 14
- Producer: Live Nation

Kelly Clarkson concert chronology
- Meaning of Life Tour (2019); Chemistry: An Intimate Evening with Kelly Clarkson (2023–2024); Kelly Clarkson: Studio Sessions (2025)

Chemistry: An Intimate Evening with Kelly Clarkson was the first concert residency by American pop recording artist Kelly Clarkson, performed at the Bakkt Theater on the Las Vegas Strip in Paradise, Nevada. The first run of shows ran for ten dates from July 28 to August 19, 2023, in support of her tenth studio album Chemistry. This came after her planned 2020 Invincible residency was canceled due to the COVID-19 pandemic. The residency was promoted by Live Nation.

== Background ==
In 2019, Clarkson announced a concert residency for 2020 but it was cancelled due the COVID-19 pandemic. Following the announcement of her tenth studio album Chemistry, in March 2023, Clarkson announced a brand new Las Vegas residency called, Chemistry: An Intimate Evening with Kelly Clarkson. Due to her busy schedule, Clarkson told her label that she could only commit to ten shows. In October 2023, four additional dates were added to her residency, December 30–31, 2023, and February 9–10, 2024.

Unlike her originally planned residency, which was supposed to be big with production, this was more intimate, with the show and set list being different each night.

== Critical reception ==
Matt Bailey of The Music Universe attended the August 11, show and said, "There was no pomp, but it made the circumstances all the more special. No costume changes, no trapdoors. No gimmicks. Just the most powerful vocalist of a generation giving it all. And I suspect, despite her TV role, after this dry run, this is not the last we will see of Kelly Clarkson on a live stage."

== Set list ==
This set list is representative of the concert on July 28, 2023. It may not represent all concerts for the residency.

1. "Favorite Kind of High"
2. "Behind These Hazel Eyes"
3. "My Life Would Suck Without You"
4. KC classic
5. Kellyoke song
6. "Lighthouse"
7. "Catch My Breath"
8. "Because of You"
9. "Me"
10. "Breakaway"
11. "Love So Soft"
12. "Walk Away"
13. "Whole Lotta Woman"
14. "Red Flag Collector"
15. KC classic
16. KC classic
17. "Mine"
18. "Heartbeat Song"
19. "Invincible"
20. "Miss Independent"
21. "Stronger (What Doesn't Kill You)"
22. "Since U Been Gone"

=== Additional notes ===
- On August 18, 2023, Clarkson's son, Remy danced on stage during "Whole Lotta Woman", and her daughter, River performed "Heartbeat Song" with her.
- On August 19, 2023, the final show of the first leg of the residency, both of Clarkson's children joined her for "Heartbeat Song".

=== KC classics ===
Aside from her hits, each night Clarkson performs different songs from her catalog.

- July 28 – "Broken & Beautiful", "Meaning of Life" and "Tightrope"
- July 29 – "Medicine", "Can I Have a Kiss" and "I Hate Love"
- August 2 - "Magic", "Someone", "Dance with Me", "I Do Not Hook Up"
- August 5 – "Low", "Beautiful Disaster", "Rock Hudson", "Piece by Piece"
- August 11 – "Skip This Part", "Let Your Tears Fall", "Heat", "Don't Waste Your Time"
- August 19 - "Sober", "A Moment Like This"

=== Kellyoke songs ===
Clarkson performs a cover track at each concert as a "Kellyoke".

- July 28 – "As It Was" by Harry Styles
- July 29 – "ABCDEFU" by Gayle
- August 2 – "Rise Up" by Andra Day (Clarkson performed this with 12-year-old Sadaya Paige. Paige has Septo-optic dysplasia and appeared on Clarkson's talk show in March 2023).
- August 4 – "Only Love Can Hurt Like This" by Paloma Faith
- August 5 – "Heart Like a Truck" by Lainey Wilson
- August 11 – "The Man I'll Never Find" by Lucius
- August 19 - "Happier Than Ever" by Billie Eilish

== Shows ==
List of concerts
Date	Attendance	Revenue
July 28, 2023	5,453 (97.55%)	$1,116,998
July 29, 2023	5,530 (98.93%)	$1,179,644
August 2, 2023	4,994 (94.94%)	$1,035,208
August 4, 2023	5,141 (97.74%)	$917,368
August 5, 2023	6,273 (99.97%)	$1,186,525
August 9, 2023	4,991 (94.89%)	$953,618
August 11, 2023	4,930 (93.73%)	$910,305
August 12, 2023	5,693 (96.90%)	$1,155,804
August 18, 2023	5,384 (97.01%)	$1,056,451
August 19, 2023	6,647 (99.51%)	$1,331,082
December 30, 2023		
December 31, 2023		
February 9, 2024		
February 10, 2024		
Total	55,036	$10,843,003
