= Kelly Clarkson: Studio Sessions =

2025–2026 concert residency by Kelly Clarkson

- Residency by Kelly Clarkson
- Promotional poster
- Location: Paradise, Nevada, U.S.
- Venue: The Colosseum at Caesars Palace
- Start date: July 11, 2025
- End date: August 15, 2026
- No. of shows: 24
- Producer: Live Nation
- Website: kellyclarkson.com/home#tour

Kelly Clarkson concert chronology
- Chemistry: An Intimate Evening with Kelly Clarkson (2023–2024); Kelly Clarkson: Studio Sessions (2025–2026)

Kelly Clarkson: Studio Sessions was the second concert residency by the American singer Kelly Clarkson, performed at the Colosseum at Caesars Palace on the Las Vegas Strip in Paradise, Nevada. The residency commenced on July 11, 2025, and concluded on August 15, 2026, featuring 24 shows. This followed her Chemistry: An Intimate Evening with Kelly Clarkson (2023–2024) residency at the Bakkt Theater. The residency was produced by Live Nation.

== Announcements ==
On February 6, 2025, Clarkson announced on her talk show she would return to the Las Vegas Strip for another residency, following her 2023 to 2024 run at the Bakkt Theater. Titled Kelly Clarkson: Studio Sessions – The Las Vegas Residency, the show will bring the "stage to the studio," as suggested by Clarkson. Following her announcement, Live Nation published eighteen dates from July to November 2025, to be hosted at the Colosseum at Caesars Palace in Paradise, Nevada. Following the announcement, Clarkson released her first independent single, "Where Have You Been" on her own record label, High Road Records.

In the hours prior to the show's July 4 commencement, Clarkson announced she had postponed the first two concerts as a preventative measure to protect her voice. In response, Caesars Palace announced ticket holders could either request a refund or await to-be-determined rescheduled dates. During opening night, Clarkson addressed the postponement, telling the audience: "We can't help our bodies sometimes if we get sick, and that happens." On August 6, 2025, the remainder of the August concerts were postponed. In a statement, Clarkson revealed her ex-husband had fallen ill and cited the need to be "fully present" for her children.

In November 2025, Caesars Entertainment announced the residency had been extended into 2026. The newly scheduled dates act as replacements for the concerts that were previously postponed.

== Production ==
In June 2025, Clarkson alluded to the inclusion of Dolly Parton in her set list via social media; in response, Parton herself suggested she perform "I Will Always Love You", stating: "I think you do one of the best versions of that song that I have ever heard... Whitney and I would both be proud". Clarkson previously performed the song, in tribute to Parton, at the 57th Academy of Country Music Awards. Genevie Durano of Las Vegas Magazine suggested several songs from the singer's catalog, including "Stronger (What Doesn't Kill You)" and "Since U Been Gone", could be included in the set. They further reported on the behind-the-scenes look of Clarkson's music to be included during the show.

The stage design for the show is inspired by a professional recording studio, with a control room and vocal booth, allowing attendees to feel as if they are witnessing a live studio recording. The decor incorporates images from Clarkson's personal collection with photographs of her musical influences, including Patty Griffin, Janis Joplin, Reba McEntire, and Parton, lining the back of the stage. Fashion-wise, for the majority of the concert, Clarkson wears a bedazzled Stevie Nicks t-shirt and denim fabric bell-bottoms, which have been altered with sequins. During the encore, she wears a gown that is reminiscent of Bob Mackie's monumental nude illusion dress designed for and worn by Cher.

== Live album ==
During opening night on July 11, Clarkson teased the potential release of a live album based on the residency. "We're having a good time, as if we were literally in the studio creating a live record, which I'm going [to] sell this [as] one day," she teased to the audience.

== Set list ==
This set list is from the July 11, 2025, concert.

1. "Me"
2. "Walk Away"
3. "Heat"
4. "Dance with Me"
5. "Behind These Hazel Eyes"
6. "Heartbeat Song"
7. "Breakaway"
8. "Didn't I"
9. "Because of You"
10. "Mine"
11. "Catch My Breath"
12. "Beautiful Disaster"
13. "Piece by Piece"
14. "Miss Independent"
15. "Sober"
16. "Favorite Kind of High"
17. "My Life Would Suck Without You"
18. "Tightrope"
19. "Stronger (What Doesn't Kill You)"

Encore

20. "Where Have You Been"
21. Kellyoke cover
22. "Since U Been Gone"

=== Kellyoke cover ===
During each concert, Clarkson performs a Kellyoke cover during the encore segment.

- July 11, 2025: "I Will Always Love You" by Dolly Parton
- July 12, 2025: "Beggin'" by "Måneskin"
- July 18, 2025: "Seven Nation Army" by the White Stripes
- July 19, 2025: "Come Together" by the Beatles
- July 25, 2025: "Walkin' After Midnight" by Patsy Cline
- July 26, 2025: "Your Love" by the Outfield
- August 1, 2025: "The Angel and the Saint" by Goldie Boutilier
- August 2, 2025: "Creep" by Radiohead

== Shows ==
Shows (2025)
Date (2025)	City	Country	Venue	Attendance	Revenue
July 11	Paradise (Note: Labeled as Las Vegas in promotional material.)	United States	The Colosseum at Caesars Palace	—	—
July 12	Paradise	United States	The Colosseum at Caesars Palace	—	—
July 18	Paradise	United States	The Colosseum at Caesars Palace	—	—
July 19	Paradise	United States	The Colosseum at Caesars Palace	—	—
July 25	Paradise	United States	The Colosseum at Caesars Palace	—	—
July 26	Paradise	United States	The Colosseum at Caesars Palace	—	—
August 1	Paradise	United States	The Colosseum at Caesars Palace	—	—
August 2	Paradise	United States	The Colosseum at Caesars Palace	—	—
November 7	Paradise	United States	The Colosseum at Caesars Palace	—	—
November 8	Paradise	United States	The Colosseum at Caesars Palace	—	—
November 14	Paradise	United States	The Colosseum at Caesars Palace	—	—
November 15	Paradise	United States	The Colosseum at Caesars Palace	—	—

Shows (2026)
Date (2026)	City	Country	Venue	Attendance	Revenue
July 17	Paradise	United States	The Colosseum at Caesars Palace	—	—
July 18	Paradise	United States	The Colosseum at Caesars Palace	—	—
July 24	Paradise	United States	The Colosseum at Caesars Palace	—	—
July 25	Paradise	United States	The Colosseum at Caesars Palace	—	—
July 31	Paradise	United States	The Colosseum at Caesars Palace	—	—
August 1	Paradise	United States	The Colosseum at Caesars Palace	—	—
August 7 (Note: The concerts on August 7–8 and August 14–15, 2026, were originally scheduled for August 8–9 and August 15–16, 2025, but were postponed due to "personal family matters".)	Paradise	United States	The Colosseum at Caesars Palace	—	—
August 8	Paradise	United States	The Colosseum at Caesars Palace	—	—
August 14	Paradise	United States	The Colosseum at Caesars Palace	—	—
August 15	Paradise	United States	The Colosseum at Caesars Palace	—	—

=== Postponed shows ===
List of postponed concerts
Date (2025)	City	Country	Venue	Reason	Ref.
July 4	Paradise	United States	The Colosseum at Caesars Palace	Vocal preservation	
July 5	Paradise	United States	The Colosseum at Caesars Palace	Vocal preservation	
