= I Hate Love =

I Hate Love may refer to:

- "I Hate Love", a 2012 song by Garbage from Not Your Kind of People
- "I Hate Love", a 2023 song by Kelly Clarkson from Chemistry
