= Brian Bowen Smith =

American photographer

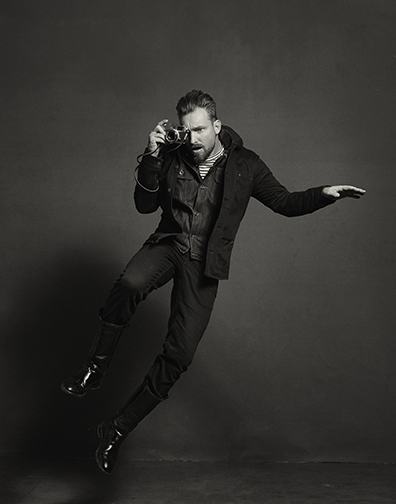
- Brian Bowen Smith self-portrait
- Born: Syracuse, New York
- Occupation: Photographer
- Children: 1

Brian Bowen Smith is an American commercial and fine-art photographer known for his celebrity portraits. He was mentored by Herb Ritts who helped him discover his own personal photographic style.

== Life and career ==
=== Early life ===
Bowen Smith was born and raised in Syracuse, New York. Before establishing his photography career, Bowen Smith was as an athlete and actor before meeting iconic American fashion photographer Herb Ritts. Bowen Smith worked as his assistant before pursuing his own photography career.

=== Commercial career ===
Bowen Smith’s professional career spans editorial, advertising, fashion, and entertainment photography. He is known for his portraits of celebrities featured on the covers of magazines. His work has been featured in publications such as Vanity Fair, Esquire, Self, GQ, and Details.

Besides editorial work, Bowen Smith has photographed key art for multiple Netflix series including Unbreakable Kimmy Schmidt, Chelsea Does, The Ridiculous 6, and The Do Over. Additional television photography credits include The Voice, House of Lies, Ray Donovan, Shameless, and Dice.

Bowen Smith has also photographed movie posters and advertisements for multiple major motion pictures. Recent credits include The Intern starring Robert De Niro and Anne Hathaway and Central Intelligence starring Dwayne Johnson and Kevin Hart.

He has also worked with several fashion brands including Marc Jacobs. Projects with Marc Jacobs include a campaign to raise awareness of skin cancer and multiple advertising campaigns.

Marc Jacobs also co-hosted the launch party of Bowen Smith’s 2013 book titled Projects. Projects features a collection of celebrity portraits taken throughout his career including those of Jennifer Aniston, Cindy Crawford, Demi Moore, Hilary Swank, and Selma Blair.

=== Fine-Art career ===
Beyond commercial photography, Bowen Smith made his fine-art debut in October 2014 with a collection called Wildlife. This solo collection was on display at De Re Gallery in Los Angeles and featured nude images of women wearing children’s animal masks. The identities of these women were kept anonymous allowing celebrities and models to participate.

In October 2015, Smith released a collection of nude photographs printed on metallic canvas called the Metallic Series.

=== Personal ===
Bowen Smith lives with his wife and son in Los Angeles.

== Editorial covers ==
2013
Miley Cyrus on Billboard
Dwayne Johnson on Essence
Cat Deeley on Women’s Health
Kristen Bell on Redbook

2014
Nicki Minaj on Billboard
Adrien Brody on Manhattan Magazine
Chris Pine on The Hollywood Reporter
Margot Robbie on Manhattan Magazine
Eddie Redmayne on Gotham
Channing Tatum on The Hollywood Reporter
James Marsden on Los Angeles Confidential
Dwayne Johnson on Men’s Health UK

2015
Gina Rodriguez on winter issue of Cosmopolitan Latino
Chloë Grace Moretz on Angeleno Magazine
Anne Hathaway on Marie Claire Japan
Julianne Moore on Angeleno Magazine
Melissa McCarthy on People

2016
Samuel L Jackson on Rhapsody Magazine
Christina Aguilera on Women’s Health
Drew Barrymore on Good Housekeeping
Jessica Chastain on Angeleno Magazine
Megan Fox on Glamour Mexico
Christoph Waltz on GQ Germany
Renée Zellweger on Stylist
Chris Pine on GQ
The Chainsmokers on Billboard

2022
Kelly Clarkson on Variety

== Album covers ==
2013
Incubus - Trust Fall (Side A)

2023
Kelly Clarkson – Chemistry
