= ABCDEFU =

2021 single by Gayle

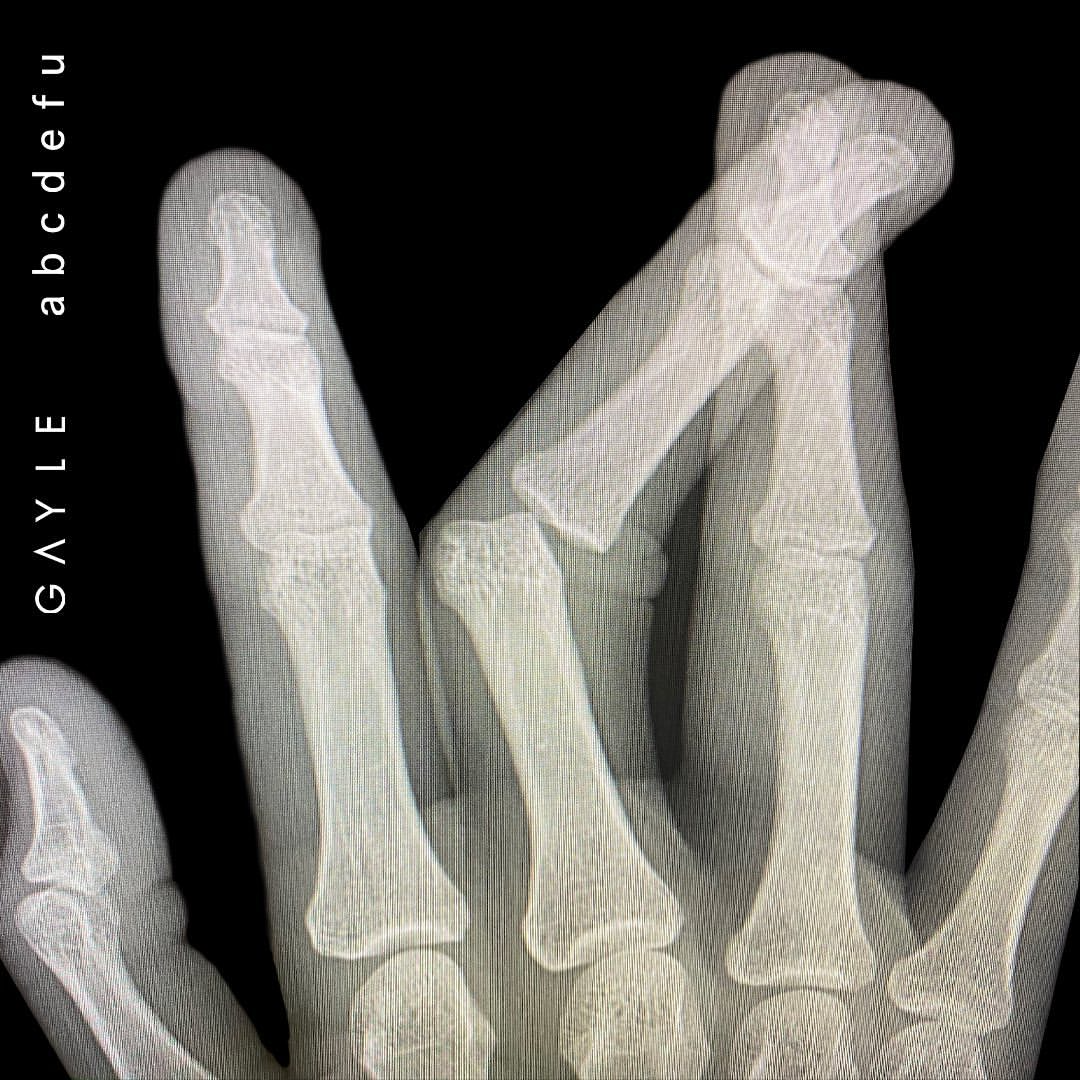

Single by Gayle

from the EP A Study of the Human Experience Volume One
- Released: August 13, 2021
- Recorded: 2020–2021
- Genre: Pop rock; pop-punk
- Length: 2:48
- Label: Atlantic; Arthouse
- Songwriters: Taylor Rutherfurd; Sara Davis; David Pittenger
- Producer: Pete Nappi

Gayle singles chronology
"Oscar Nominated" (2021)	"ABCDEFU" (2021)	"Ur Just Horny" (2022)

Music video
- "ABCDEFU" on YouTube

"ABCDEFU" (also known by its radio-edited title "ABC (Nicer)"; stylized in all lowercase) is the major-label debut single by American singer Gayle, released on August 13, 2021, through Atlantic and Arthouse Records. It was co-written by Gayle with Sara Davis and David Pittenger, and produced by Pete Nappi. The song is the lead single from Gayle's debut EP A Study of the Human Experience Volume One.

"ABCDEFU" reached number one on the Billboard Global 200 and, in the United States, peaked at number three on the Billboard Hot 100. Outside the US, "ABCDEFU" topped the charts in 16 countries.

In 2022, the song was nominated for Song of the Year for the 65th Annual Grammy Awards.

== Background and promotion ==
The song marks the first single release since the Nashville-based singer signed with Atlantic Records/Arthouse Records in 2021. On her TikTok account, Gayle uploaded a video where she stated "I'm out of [song] ideas" and asked followers to comment song ideas. She said, "Comment anything and I'll try my best to turn it into a song." Nancy Berman, a marketing manager at Atlantic Records, commented, asking for a song that incorporates the alphabet. Within a few days, Gayle uploaded another video of her strumming the chorus of the song.

According to Gayle, the song "came from a place of trying so hard to be the nice, respectful ex-girlfriend, to the point where it was negatively affecting me". In an interview with Tongue Tied Mag, Gayle explained the inspiration behind the song: "After the breakup, I was trying really, really hard to be a nice person. Like overcompensating for it. Like the week after we broke up, I called him and was like, 'hey bud!' and 'what's up my friend?!'." On March 31, 2021, Gayle stated on Instagram that she had dislocated her middle finger, and the X-ray scan from the hospital was used for the single's cover art.

The song achieved mainstream success within a few months after release, surpassing over 500 million global streams as of March 2022. Gayle has since released different versions of the song, including the demo, a "chill version", and an "angrier version". The original song reached 1 billion streams on July 9, 2023.

== Music video ==
The accompanying music video was released alongside the single. The video was shot via a camcorder at a low resolution to evoke early 2000s home videos. In the music video, the singer and her friends break into and look around her ex's home.

== Composition ==
According to the digital sheet music published at musicnotes.com by Warner Music Publishing, "ABCDEFU" is written in the key of E major with a tempo of 122 beats per minute, with Gayle's vocals ranging from G♯_{3} to C♯_{5}. The song's title and lyrical content are a play on words incorporating the first six letters of the alphabet with the addition of the twenty-first, to form an initialism for the profane phrase "Fuck yoU". In the "angrier" version, Gayle sings in the hook "A-B-C-D-E fuck you" to represent its meaning.

Sonically, the song is characterized by "minimalistic sonics" and "jagged guitar work", while it "reaches its climax with a massive sing-a-long chorus".

== Critical reception ==
The song has been a viral hit on platforms such as TikTok and Instagram. Emily Zemler of Rolling Stone praised the passion of Gayle's live renditions of the piece. April Bredael of Tongue Tied Magazine thought the song "adds to a growing list of accomplishments" of the singer with tracks that are "authentic, honest, and unapologetic".

== Track listing ==
Digital download and streaming (Nicer version)

1. "ABC" (nicer) – 2:48

Digital download and streaming (Demo version)

1. "ABCDEFU" (demo) – 2:35

Digital download and streaming (Chill version)

1. "ABCDEFU" (chill) – 2:56

Digital download and streaming (Angrier version)

1. "ABCDEFU" (angrier) – 2:39

Digital download and streaming (featuring Royal & the Serpent)

1. "ABCDEFU" (featuring Royal & the Serpent) – 2:49

Digital download and streaming ABC (The Wild Remix)

1. "ABC" (The Wild Remix) – 3:02

== Charts ==
=== Weekly charts ===
Weekly chart performance for "ABCDEFU"
Chart (2021–2023)	Peak position
Australia (ARIA)	2
Austria (Ö3 Austria Top 40)	1
Belarus Airplay (TopHit)	62
Belgium (Ultratop 50 Flanders)	2
Belgium (Ultratop 50 Wallonia)	1
Brazil Airplay (Top 100 Brasil)	76
Bulgaria Airplay (PROPHON)	5
Canada (Canadian Hot 100)	2
CIS Airplay (TopHit)	1
Croatia International Airplay (Top lista)	3
Czech Republic Airplay (ČNS IFPI)	2
Czech Republic Singles Digital (ČNS IFPI)	3
Denmark (Tracklisten)	9
Estonia Airplay (TopHit)	145
Finland (Suomen virallinen lista)	1
France (SNEP)	4
Germany (GfK)	1
Global 200 (Billboard)	1
Greece International (IFPI)	4
Guatemala Airplay (Monitor Latino)	16
Hungary (Rádiós Top 40)	1
Hungary (Single Top 40)	8
Hungary (Stream Top 40)	4
Iceland (Tónlistinn)	1
India International (IMI)	5
Indonesia (Billboard)	15
Ireland (IRMA)	1
Israel International Airplay (Media Forest)	1
Italy (FIMI)	6
Japan Hot Overseas (Billboard Japan)	6
Lithuania (AGATA)	2
Luxembourg (Billboard)	1
Malaysia (RIM)	1
Mexico Airplay (Billboard)	1
Moldova Airplay (TopHit)	41
Netherlands (Dutch Top 40)	3
Netherlands (Single Top 100)	4
New Zealand (Recorded Music NZ)	3
Norway (VG-lista)	1
Peru Streaming (UNIMPRO)	72
Philippines (Billboard)	14
Poland Airplay (ZPAV)	2
Portugal (AFP)	3
Romania Airplay (UPFR)	4
Romania Airplay (Media Forest)	2
Romania TV Airplay (Media Forest)	1
Russia Airplay (TopHit)	2
San Marino Airplay (SMRTV Top 50)	11
Singapore (RIAS)	2
Slovakia Airplay (ČNS IFPI)	4
Slovakia Singles Digital (ČNS IFPI)	5
South Africa Streaming (TOSAC)	20
South Korea (Gaon)	5
Spain (Promusicae)	30
Sweden (Sverigetopplistan)	1
Switzerland (Schweizer Hitparade)	1
Ukraine Airplay (TopHit)	1
UK Singles (Official Charts)	1
US Billboard Hot 100	3
US Adult Contemporary (Billboard)	15
US Adult Top 40 (Billboard)	1
US Hot Rock & Alternative Songs (Billboard)	2
US Mainstream Top 40 (Billboard)	1
US Rhythmic (Billboard)	36
US Rock Airplay (Billboard)	23
Vietnam (Vietnam Hot 100)	15

2026 weekly chart performance for "ABCDEFU"
Chart (2026)	Peak position
Russia Streaming (TopHit)	68

=== Monthly charts ===
2022–2023 chart performance for "ABCDEFU"
Chart (2022–2023)	Peak position
Belarus Airplay (TopHit)	71
CIS Airplay (TopHit)	1
Czech Republic (Rádio Top 100)	11
Czech Republic (Singles Digitál Top 100)	7
Russia Airplay (TopHit)	4
Slovakia (Rádio Top 100)	5
Slovakia (Singles Digitál Top 100)	8
Ukraine Airplay (TopHit)	2

2026 monthly chart performance for "ABCDEFU"
Chart (2026)	Peak position
Russia Streaming (TopHit)	80

=== Year-end charts ===
2021 year-end chart performance for "ABCDEFU"
Chart (2021)	Position
Hungary (Stream Top 40)	54

2022 year-end chart performance for "ABCDEFU"
Chart (2022)	Position
Australia (ARIA)	12
Austria (Ö3 Austria Top 40)	2
Brazil (Pro-Música Brasil)	163
Belgium (Ultratop 50 Flanders)	5
Belgium (Ultratop 50 Wallonia)	3
Canada (Canadian Hot 100)	9
CIS Airplay (TopHit)	4
Denmark (Tracklisten)	41
Germany (Official German Charts)	4
Global 200 (Billboard)	7
Hungary (Rádiós Top 40)	1
Hungary (Single Top 40)	40
Hungary (Stream Top 40)	33
Italy (FIMI)	35
Lithuania (AGATA)	44
Netherlands (Dutch Top 40)	24
Netherlands (Single Top 100)	48
New Zealand (Recorded Music NZ)	20
Poland (ZPAV)	26
Russia Airplay (TopHit)	10
South Korea (Circle)	60
Sweden (Sverigetopplistan)	42
Switzerland (Schweizer Hitparade)	8
UK Singles (OCC)	17
Ukraine Airplay (TopHit)	13
US Billboard Hot 100	17
US Adult Contemporary (Billboard)	33
US Adult Top 40 (Billboard)	15
US Hot Rock & Alternative Songs (Billboard)	2
US Mainstream Top 40 (Billboard)	18
Vietnam (Vietnam Hot 100)	65

2023 year-end chart performance for "ABCDEFU"
Chart (2023)	Position
Belarus Airplay (TopHit)	79
CIS Airplay (TopHit)	65
Hungary (Rádiós Top 40)	20
Moldova Airplay (TopHit)	138
Russia Airplay (TopHit)	141
Ukraine Airplay (TopHit)	45

2024 year-end chart performance for "ABCDEFU"
Chart (2024)	Position
Belarus Airplay (TopHit)	136
Hungary (Rádiós Top 40)	37
Lithuania Airplay (TopHit)	104

2025 year-end chart performance for "ABCDEFU"
Chart (2025)	Position
Hungary (Rádiós Top 40)	39
Lithuania Airplay (TopHit)	125

== Certifications ==
Certifications for "ABCDEFU"
Region	Certification	Certified units/sales
Australia (ARIA)	3× Platinum	210,000^{‡}
Austria (IFPI Austria)	4× Platinum	120,000^{‡}
Brazil (Pro-Música Brasil)	2× Platinum	80,000^{‡}
Canada (Music Canada)	4× Platinum	320,000^{‡}
Denmark (IFPI Danmark)	Platinum	90,000^{‡}
France (SNEP)	Diamond	333,333^{‡}
Germany (BVMI)	3× Gold	600,000^{‡}
Italy (FIMI)	3× Platinum	300,000^{‡}
New Zealand (RMNZ)	Platinum	30,000^{‡}
Poland (ZPAV)	4× Platinum	200,000^{‡}
Portugal (AFP)	2× Platinum	20,000^{‡}
Spain (Promusicae)	Platinum	60,000^{‡}
United Kingdom (BPI)	2× Platinum	1,200,000^{‡}
United States (RIAA)	4× Platinum	4,000,000^{‡}
^{‡} Sales+streaming figures based on certification alone.

== Release history ==
Release history for "ABCDEFU"
Region	Date	Format	Version	Label	Ref.
Various	August 13, 2021	Digital download; streaming	Original	Atlantic	
Various	August 14, 2021	Digital download; streaming	Nicer	Atlantic	
Various	September 10, 2021	Digital download; streaming	Demo	Atlantic	
Various	September 17, 2021	Digital download; streaming	Chill	Atlantic	
Various	September 24, 2021	Digital download; streaming	Angrier	Atlantic	
Various	November 19, 2021	Digital download; streaming	Royal & the Serpent remix	Atlantic	
Italy	November 26, 2021	Radio airplay	Original	Warner	
United States	December 7, 2021	Contemporary hit radio	Original	Atlantic	
Various	December 31, 2021	Digital download; streaming	The Wild remix	Atlantic	
Various	February 18, 2022	CD single	Original; Nicer; Demo; Chill; Angrier; Royal & the Serpent remix	Atlantic; Warner	
