= Kellyoke =

EP by Kelly Clarkson
- Released: June 9, 2022
- Length: 22:14
- Label: Atlantic
- Producer: Jason Halbert

Kelly Clarkson chronology
When Christmas Comes Around... (2021)	Kellyoke (2022)	Chemistry (2023)

Singles from Kellyoke
- 1. "Happier Than Ever" Released: May 25, 2022

Kellyoke is a cover extended play (EP) by American singer Kelly Clarkson. The title is a portmanteau of her first name and the word "karaoke". It is based on the Kellyoke cold open segment which opens each episode of her show The Kelly Clarkson Show, where Clarkson and her band perform various song covers (adjusted slightly for time) that are either requested by fans or studio audience members, are a standard or favorite song of that day's lead guest (usually a musical performer themselves which may be their own song), or are originally by artists who inspired her personally - thus the name Kellyoke. She has performed songs by artists such as the Weeknd, Whitney Houston, Aerosmith, The Chicks, & Nat King Cole among many others. The segment occasionally uses previous or taped performances on taping days where Clarkson is either unavailable to perform a song or is on vocal rest due to illness, or to preserve her voice for other commitments. "Cameo-oke" covers was introduced in the sixth season, with musical guests performing at the beginning of the show.

Clarkson's band, My Band Y'All, is directed by pianist Jason Halbert and features vocal director and singer Jessi Collins, guitarist Jaco Caraco, bassist Joe Ayoub, and drummer Lester Estelle II.

The EP was released on June 9, 2022, through Atlantic Records.

== Track listing ==
Kellyoke track listing
No.	Title	Writer(s)	Original performer(s)	Length
1.	"Blue Bayou"	Roy Orbison; Joe Melson	Roy Orbison	3:52
2.	"Call Out My Name"	Abel Tesfaye; Adam Feeney; Nicolás Jaar	The Weeknd	3:45
3.	"Happier Than Ever"	Billie Eilish O'Connell; Finneas O'Connell	Billie Eilish	4:14
4.	"Queen of the Night"	Whitney Houston; Kenneth Edmonds; Daryl Simmons; Antonio Reid	Whitney Houston	3:10
5.	"Trampoline"	Chelsea Lee; Max Ernst; Spencer Ernst; Alex Mendoza	Shaed	2:45
6.	"Fake Plastic Trees"	Thom Yorke; Jonny Greenwood; Colin Greenwood; Ed O'Brien; Philip Selway	Radiohead	4:28
Total length:				22:18

== Charts ==
Chart performance for Kellyoke
Chart (2022)	Peak position
UK Album Downloads (OCC)	50
US Top Album Sales (Billboard)	47
