= I'd Be Lyin' =

Single by Kelly Clarkson
- Released: July 17, 2026
- Genre: Pop rock
- Length: 3:17
- Label: High Road
- Songwriters: Kelly Clarkson; Jason Halbert; Jaco Caraco
- Producers: Jason Halbert; Jaco Caraco

Kelly Clarkson singles chronology
"Where Have You Been" (2025)	"I'd Be Lyin'" (2026)

Music video
- "I'd Be Lyin'" on YouTube

"I'd Be Lyin'" is a song by American singer-songwriter Kelly Clarkson, released on July 17, 2026, through her independent record label High Road Records. Clarkson co-wrote the song with her music director Jason Halbert and guitarist Jaco Caraco, both of whom produced the record. The track, inspired by her real life experiences, combines elements of Prince-inspired staccato pop and pop-rock. It was highlighted for its sarcastic lyrical tone and themes of miscommunication. After premiering the song on SiriusXM, she has performed the song in her Kelly Clarkson: Studio Sessions residency at The Colosseum at Caesars Palace in Las Vegas, Nevada.

== Overview ==
"I'd Be Lyin'" was written by Clarkson with Jason Halbert and Jaco Caraco.According to Clarkson, the concept behind the song centers on the frustration of miscommunication and the refusal to compromise one's truth just to appease others. Discussing the track's lyrical inspiration, Clarkson explained:

"Basically, my new song 'I'd Be Lyin'' is about when you're talking to someone and what you're saying is somehow being filtered, 'cause it's not what they're hearing. And if I'd just leaned in and said what they wanted to hear, I would be lying."

"I'd Be Lyin'" transitions between distinct sonic styles across its runtime. The verses utilize a "staccato poppiness" heavily influenced by the musical style of Prince, delivering a breakdown filled with "attitude." The song's composition shifts dramatically as it moves into the chorus. The arrangement opens up into a major-key pop rock structure, which Clarkson noted is highly reminiscent of her previous signature empowerment anthems.

== Release ==
On July 13, 2026, "I'd Be Lyin'" made its exclusive world premiere on SiriusXM. The track debuted at 12:00 PM ET on The Kelly Clarkson Connection (Channel 12), Clarkson's dedicated SiriusXM channel. The radio platform ran exclusive airings of the single throughout the entire week leading up to its wider commercial release. The single became available on digital download and global streaming platforms on July 17, 2026.

=== Chart performance ===
Following its commercial release, "I'd Be Lyin'" saw immediate commercial traction on purchase-based sales platforms. In the United States, the single debuted at No. 7 on the Billboard Digital Song Sales chart. According to data compiled by Luminate, the song moved 2,200 digital download sales during its initial tracking week. While noted by industry analysts as a quick top 10 entry on the sales front, it was characterized as a steady climber rather than an instant streaming juggernaut upon arrival. Internationally, the track achieved a peak of No. 52 on the Official UK Singles Downloads Chart during its release week.

=== Live performances ===
Clarkson debuted the first-ever live performance of "I'd Be Lyin'" on July 17, 2026, coinciding with the track's global commercial release. The live debut took place at The Colosseum at Caesars Palace in Las Vegas, Nevada, serving as the opening night for the summer leg of her Kelly Clarkson: Studio Sessions residency, and has since included it in subsequent dates from July to August 2026.

== Charts ==
Chart performance
Chart (2026)	Peak position
Canada Digital Song Sales (Billboard)	18
UK Singles Downloads (Official Charts)	52
US Digital Song Sales (Billboard)	7

== Release history ==
Release history
Region	Date	Format	Label	Catalog number	Ref.
Various	July 17, 2026	Streaming	High Road	QT6EB2663773	
