= Chemistry (Kelly Clarkson album) =

2023 studio album by Kelly Clarkson

Studio album by Kelly Clarkson
- Released: June 23, 2023
- Recorded: 2020–2022
- Studios: The Listening Station (Universal City, CA); Off the Wall Studios (Nashville, TN); The Ribcage (Los Angeles, CA); Germano Studios (New York, NY)
- Genres: Pop; pop rock
- Length: 44:40
- Label: Atlantic
- Producers: Jane Black; Jason Halbert; Eric Serna; Jesse Shatkin

Kelly Clarkson chronology
| Kellyoke (2022) | Chemistry (2023) |

Singles from Chemistry
- 1. "Mine" / "Me" Released: April 14, 2023; 2. "Favorite Kind of High" Released: May 19, 2023; 3. "Lighthouse" / "I Won't Give Up" Released: March 1, 2024

Chemistry is the tenth studio album by American singer Kelly Clarkson. It was released on June 23, 2023, through Atlantic Records. The album is produced by Clarkson's longtime collaborators, Jason Halbert and Jesse Shatkin, as well as newcomers Erick Serna and Rachel Orscher. It is her first full-length studio album release of original material since 2017's Meaning of Life and final release under Atlantic Records.

The album features collaborations with Steve Martin and Sheila E. According to Clarkson, it illustrates "the arc of an entire relationship", showing every emotion one experiences from the beginning to the end, related to the end of her marriage with Brandon Blackstock.

Chemistry was met with positive reviews, with critics praising Clarkson's voice and the album's emotional and sonic dexterity. The album was promoted with two singles: the double-A-side singles, "Mine" / "Me" and "Favorite Kind of High". Chemistry was also a commercial success. It debuted at number 6 on the Billboard 200 with 53,000 equivalent album units earned, of which 9,000 SEA units account for 11.25 million on-demand official streams and 43,000 albums sales, making it the top-selling physical album of the week. It became Clarkson's ninth top-10 album in the United States. Aswell as reaching the top 40 on 7 further charts respectively.

The album supported Clarkson's first ever Las Vegas residency, Chemistry: An Intimate Evening with Kelly Clarkson, which ran for fourteen nights from July 28, 2023, to February 10, 2024. A deluxe reissue of the album featuring five new tracks was released on September 22, 2023. Chemistry was nominated for Best Pop Vocal Album at the 66th Annual Grammy Awards.

== Background ==
Clarkson started working on the follow-up to her 2017 album, Meaning of Life, in 2019. In June 2020, she announced her divorce from husband Brandon Blackstock. Prior to the divorce, she described the album as if Breakaway (2004) and Stronger (2011) had a baby, and more like Meaning of Life. When she appeared on Sunday Today with Willie Geist in September 2020, she then described the album as every emotion you experience from the beginning to the end of a relationship. She calls it the most personal one she has ever released, and it has been therapeutic for her. Clarkson mentioned she had written around sixty songs while going through her divorce.

In a September 2022 interview with Variety, Clarkson talked about the album. She said she had been working on it for two years; it was an important one, and a lot of the songs were recorded two years earlier (2020). When the divorce happened, she needed to write about it. She told her label, "I can't talk about this until I've gone through it," and it's just taken some time to do that. That's one of the reasons we've done a lot of the Christmas stuff the past two years – because I was like, "Well, that's happy!" Describing the record, she says, "And it's not all bad – like, there is heartbreak in it, and there is sadness in it."

In January 2023, during an Instagram live, she mentioned she had just done the album photo shoot with Brian Bowen Smith. While appearing on Angie Martinez's Angie Martinez IRL podcast, Clarkson mentioned one of the songs on the album is called "Red Flag Collector".

== Recording and production ==
Clarkson recorded most of the album in 2020. Two of Clarkson's frequent collaborators, Jason Halbert and Jesse Shatkin, returned to produce this album along with newcomers Eric Serna and Rachel Orscher.

== Composition ==
Clarkson wrote on all but two of the album's tracks. "High Road" the third track, is an original song by the duo Jane Black. Rachel Orscher of Jane Black is the associate music producer for The Kelly Clarkson Show, and when Clarkson heard it she thought about asking Orscher if she could cover it during one of her Kellyoke segments. Orscher then allowed Clarkson to record the song for the album. Orscher helped produce it with Halbert, and allowed Clarkson to take the song up an octave.

The fourth song "Me" was first written by Gayle and Josh Ronen. They wrote the first verse and chorus. When Clarkson told Atlantic that she was a fan of Gayle's, they told her that she was their artist. Atlantic then sent Clarkson the song. In one night, Clarkson finished the rest of the song.

Clarkson, Jesse Shatkin, and Carly Rae Jepsen wrote the seventh song "Favorite Kind of High". Before it was given to Clarkson, Jepsen wrote the track to it, with Clarkson writing the lyrics and melody when she was given it. One of the happier songs on the album, it is described as a "sexy-ass song" and how it's about "that high when you first see someone and you're like 'Oh, shit.'"

"Red Flag Collector", written by Clarkson, Halbert, and her guitarist Jaco Caraco, begins with a western saloon style vibe with a guitar strum and whistling (from Caraco). The song then takes a more rock turn. A whip can be heard throughout the song, and trumpets are added halfway through. In the bridge, the western saloon style briefly returns with the piano.

The thirteenth track, "I Hate Love", which Clarkson describes as a pop-punk track, features Steve Martin on banjo. Clarkson references Martin in the song which gave her to the idea for Martin to play banjo on it. The title of the track is used in a sarcastic manner. Sheila E. plays drums on the last song "That's Right."

== Release and promotion ==
Chemistry was released by Atlantic Records on June 23, 2023. In a September 2022 interview with Variety, Clarkson announced she would release the album in 2023, calling the album "important" and citing music as "helpful" in vocalizing what she feels. On March 25, 2023, Clarkson tweeted wine, heartbreak and sunshine emojis, which is how she described the album while appearing on Access Daily in January 2023. The following day, she announced the album's title on her social media accounts and announced it would be released "soon". There are multiple colored Vinyl LPs.

On April 24, 2023, to help celebrate the release of the album, Clarkson performed the entire Chemistry album at the Belasco Theatre in Los Angeles. The show was taped. On June 22, 2023, she appeared on The Today Show to promote the album. She returned to Today on September 22, 2023, to perform. She performed "Favorite Kind of High", "Mine", "Lighthouse", and "Since U Been Gone". The deluxe reissue of the album was released the same day. She then performed at the iHeartRadio Music Festival in Las Vegas on September 23, where she sung "Stronger (What Doesn't Kill You)", "Mine", "Miss Independent", "Lighthouse" and "Since U Been Gone. On October 13, she performed "Lighthouse" on The Tonight Show Starring Jimmy Fallon. On October 16, she opened the fifth season of her talk show with "I Won't Give Up", and later appeared on Late Night with Seth Meyers.

Clarkson promoted the album during a fourteen night Las Vegas residency, Chemistry: An Intimate Evening with Kelly Clarkson. It ran from July 28 to August 19, 2023, December 30–31, 2023, and February 9–10, 2024, at the Bakkt Theater.

=== Singles ===
"Mine" and "Me" served as the album's lead single as a double-A-side. Clarkson explained the reason behind the release, saying "we decided to release 'Mine' and 'Me' at the same time because I didn't want to release just one song to represent an entire album, or relationship." It was released on April 14, 2023.

"Favorite Kind of High" was released as the album's second single on May 19, 2023.

"I Hate Love" featuring Steve Martin and "Red Flag Collector" were released as promotional singles on June 2 and 9, 2023.

Two days before the album was released, "Lighthouse" was released as the third promotional single on June 21, 2023 before being released as the album's third single as a double-A-side on vinyl along with "I Won't Give Up" on March 1, 2024.

== Critical reception ==
Professional ratings
Aggregate scores
| Source | Rating |
|---|---|
| Metacritic | 70/100 |
Review scores
| Source | Rating |
| AllMusic | 3/5 stars |
| i | 3/5 stars |
| The Line of Best Fit | 7/10 |
| Metro | 4/5 stars |
| MusicOMH | 4/5 stars |
| PopMatters | 7/10 |
| Slant Magazine | 3.5/5 stars |

Chemistry was met with positive reviews from critics, who praised Clarkson's voice and the album's emotional and sonic dexterity. On review aggregator Metacritic, which assigns a normalized rating out of 100 to reviews from professional publications, chemistry received a score of 70 out of 100 based on seven reviews.

Critics praised the personal nature of Chemistry, with Hanif Abdurraqib of The New Yorker writing that the album "successfully preserves the aura of interpersonal intimacy that Clarkson has cultivated with audiences for two decades" with Clarkson at times "sing[ing] in a torrential flow, like a person who has held her frustrations and aches inside for too long." Ilana Kaplan of Rolling Stone similarly wrote, "the record hinges on Clarkson's emotive vocals and soul-baring lyrics, turning Chemistry into her most vulnerable project since My December."

Lindsay Zoladz of The New York Times praised Clarkson's vocals and highlighted the "wrenching, piano-driven torch song 'Lighthouse'" in particular, a song she described as "one of the album’s most impassioned vocal performances."

Kate Solomon of i also praised the album's exploration of emotion and wrote, "Chemistry ripples with sadness even at its most upbeat moments. Clarkson has always been a master of the heartbroken power ballads but these feel more understated than her adolescent weepies. She's more restrained, more mature and more conflicted." Lucy Norris of Metro wrote, "Chemistry was three years in the making and ultimately ripped apart her breakup, while allowing listeners physically feel her put herself right back together again in the most triumphant exploration of love we’ve ever heard from the 2002 American Idol champion."

== Commercial performance ==
Chemistry debuted at number 6 on the Billboard 200 with 53,000 equivalent album units earned, of which 9,000 SEA units account for 11.25 million on-demand official streams and 43,000 albums sales, making it the top-selling physical album of the week. It became Clarkson's ninth top-10 album in the United States.

== Track listing ==
Chemistry track listing
| No. | Title | Writer(s) | Producer(s) | Length |
|---|---|---|---|---|
| 1. | "Skip This Part" | Kelly Clarkson; Jason Halbert | Halbert | 3:37 |
| 2. | "Mine" | Clarkson; Erick Serna; Jesse Shatkin | Serna; Shatkin | 3:11 |
| 3. | "High Road" | Rachel Orscher; Justin Womble | Jane Black; Halbert | 3:19 |
| 4. | "Me" | Clarkson; Taylor Rutherford; Josh Ronen | Halbert; Shatkin | 3:35 |
| 5. | "Down to You" | Clarkson; Shatkin; Maureen McDonald | Shatkin | 3:09 |
| 6. | "Chemistry" | Clarkson; Shatkin; Serna | Shatkin; Randy Runyon | 2:30 |
| 7. | "Favorite Kind of High" | Clarkson; Shatkin; Carly Rae Jepsen | Shatkin | 2:55 |
| 8. | "Magic" | Clarkson; Shatkin; Runyon | Shatkin | 3:15 |
| 9. | "Lighthouse" | Clarkson; Shatkin; Aben Eubanks | Shatkin | 3:21 |
| 10. | "Rock Hudson" | Clarkson; Shatkin | Shatkin | 3:22 |
| 11. | "My Mistake" | Shatkin; Alex Hope; Sean Douglas | Shatkin | 3:16 |
| 12. | "Red Flag Collector" | Clarkson; Halbert; Jaco Caraco | Halbert | 2:58 |
| 13. | "I Hate Love" (featuring Steve Martin) | Clarkson; Shatkin; Nick Jonas | Shatkin | 3:33 |
| 14. | "That's Right" (featuring Sheila E.) | Clarkson; Shatkin; Serna | Shatkin; Serna | 2:39 |
| Total length: | | | | 44:40 |

Chemistry – Deluxe edition (bonus tracks)
| No. | Title | Writer(s) | Producer(s) | Length |
|---|---|---|---|---|
| 15. | "I Won't Give Up" | Clarkson; Shatkin; Jessica Karpov; Max Wolfgang; Peter Townsend | Shatkin | 3:28 |
| 16. | "Did You Know" | Clarkson; Shatkin; Chris Kelly; John Ryan; Ruth-Anne Cunningham | Shatkin | 3:09 |
| 17. | "You Don't Make Me Cry" (featuring River Rose) | Clarkson; Shatkin | Shatkin | 3:24 |
| 18. | "Goodbye" | Clarkson; Halbert | Halbert | 3:17 |
| 19. | "Roses" | Clarkson; Shatkin; Douglas; Amy Allen | Shatkin | 3:33 |
| 20. | "Mine" (Live from the Belasco) | Clarkson; Serna; Shatkin | | 3:22 |
| 21. | "Favorite Kind of High" (David Guetta remix) | Clarkson; Shatkin; Jepsen | Shatkin | 2:33 |
| 22. | "Mine" (Ty Sunderland remix) | Clarkson; Serna; Shatkin | | 4:01 |
| Total length: | | | | 1:11:00 |

== Personnel ==
Vocals

- Kelly Clarkson – lead vocals
- Jaco Caraco – background vocals (12)
- Qirsten Carter – background vocals (4)
- Jessi Collins – background vocals (4)
- Sean Douglas – additional vocals (11)
- Lester Estelle – background vocals (12)
- Onterio Fisher – background vocals (4)
- Jason Halbert – background vocals (12)
- Carlos Murguia – background vocals (12)
- Rachel Orscher – background vocals (3)
- Sarah Perez – background vocals (4)
- James Pound – background vocals (4)
- Sandy Redd – background vocals (4)
- River Rose – featured vocals (17)
- Kyle Whalum – background vocals (12)

Musicians

- Jaco Caraco – guitar (1, 3, 12), bass guitar, whistle (12)
- Chad Carouthers – guitar, additional programming (12)
- Devin Collins – drums (5, 6, 13, 14)
- Samuel Dent – strings (4, 9)
- Sheila E. – percussion (14)
- Drew Erickson – strings (11)
- Lester Estelle – drums (tracks 1, 3, 12)
- Jason Halbert – keyboards, programming (1, 4, 12); additional programming (2), piano (4, 12), Hammond B3 organ (4)
- Keyon Harrold – trumpet (14)
- Joe Kennedy – piano (9)
- Jeff King – banjo (12)
- Daniel Levin – trombone, trumpet (14)
- Steve Martin – banjo (13)
- Catherine Marx – piano (12)
- Ray Montiero – trumpet (12)
- Gabe Noel – bass guitar (9, 11)
- Rachel Orscher – keyboards, programming (3)
- Garrett Ray – drums (2, 7, 8, 10, 11)
- Ric Robbins – DJ (12)
- Randy Runyon – guitar (5, 6, 8–11, 13)
- Jesse Shatkin – keyboards (2, 4, 6–11, 13, 14), strings (2), bass guitar (4, 5, 10, 11, 13, 14), percussion (4, 6–8, 10, 11, 13), synthesizer (4–11, 13, 14), drums (4, 12), drum programming (5, 7, 8), guitar (5, 10), piano (10, 11, 13), string programming (10)
- Erick Serna – bass guitar (2, 6), guitar (2, 7, 14)
- Jake Sinclair – bass guitar, guitar (7)
- Matt Stanfield – Hammond B3 organ, additional keyboards, additional programming (1)
- Kyle Whalum – bass guitar (12)
- Justin Womble – guitar, additional programming (3)

Production

- Bryce Bordone – mix engineering
- Ezekiel Chabon – additional engineering (5–10, 13, 14)
- Nathan Cimino – engineering (2, 4–8, 10, 13, 14)
- Kelly Clarkson – executive producer
- Mychael Davison – engineering (14)
- John Denosky – additional engineering
- Samuel Dent – engineering (2, 4–11, 13, 14)
- Chris Gehringer – mastering
- Serban Ghenea – mixing
- David Grant – marketing
- Jason Halbert – co-producer (2, 5–11, 13, 14), engineering (1, 3, 4, 12), producer (1, 3, 4, 12)
- Jane Black – producer (3)
- Nich Jones – engineering (2, 5–11, 13, 14)
- Eric Olson – additional engineering
- Randy Runyon – producer (6)
- Eric Serna – producer (2, 14)
- Jesse Shatkin – engineering (2, 4–11, 13, 14), producer (2, 4–11, 13, 14)
- Jake Sinclair – additional producer
- Robert Venable – engineering (1, 3, 4, 12)
- Rhonda Woodrum – project manager

Imagery

- Gloria Elias-Foeillet – makeup
- Alex Kirzhner – art direction
- Candace Lambert McAndrews – styling
- Robert Ramos – hair
- Brian Bowen Smith – photography

== Charts ==
=== Weekly charts ===
Weekly chart performance for Chemistry
| Chart (2023) | Peak position |
|---|---|
| Australian Albums (ARIA) | 31 |
| Canadian Albums (Billboard) | 15 |
| German Albums (Offizielle Top 100) | 81 |
| Hungarian Physical Albums (MAHASZ) | 34 |
| Scottish Albums (Official Charts) | 9 |
| Spanish Vinyl Albums (PROMUSICAE) | 58 |
| Swiss Albums (Schweizer Hitparade) | 36 |
| UK Albums (Official Charts) | 34 |
| US Billboard 200 | 6 |

=== Year-end charts ===
Year-end chart performance for Chemistry
| Chart (2023) | Position |
|---|---|
| US Top Album Sales (Billboard) | 86 |

== Release history ==
Chemistry release history
| Region | Date | Format(s) | Label | Editions | Ref. |
|---|---|---|---|---|---|
| Various | June 23, 2023 | CD; digital download; streaming; vinyl | Atlantic | Standard | |
| Various | September 22, 2023 | CD; digital download; streaming | Atlantic | Deluxe | |
