= Santa, Can't You Hear Me =

Single by Kelly Clarkson and Ariana Grande

from the album When Christmas Comes Around...
- Released: December 9, 2022
- Recorded: August 26, 2021
- Studio: Glenwood Place Studios (Burbank, CA); The Listening Station (Pasadena, CA); The Vibe Room (Universal City, CA)
- Genre: Pop; big band
- Length: 4:02
- Label: Atlantic
- Songwriters: Kelly Clarkson; Aben Eubanks
- Producer: Jason Halbert

Kelly Clarkson singles chronology
"9 to 5" (2022)	"Santa, Can't You Hear Me" (2022)	"Mine" / "Me" (2023)

Ariana Grande singles chronology
"It Was a... (Masked Christmas)" (2021)	"Santa, Can't You Hear Me" (2022)	"Die for You" (remix) (2023)

"Santa, Can't You Hear Me" is a duet by American singers Kelly Clarkson and Ariana Grande. It is the second single from Clarkson's ninth studio album and second Christmas album, When Christmas Comes Around... (2021). The song was written by Clarkson with Aben Eubanks, with the song's track recording was produced by Jason Halbert.

== Release and reception ==
"Santa, Can't You Hear Me" was written by Clarkson with Aben Eubanks and produced by Jason Halbert. Following filming the 21st season of the American reality television series The Voice, Clarkson invited Grande to record the track with her. "Santa, Can't You Hear Me" was released by Atlantic Records on October 15, 2021, the day of the album's release. An uptempo big band pop Christmas anthem, the song lyrics sing of an appeal to Santa Claus. Instead of material gifts, the singers ask for answers on how they can achieve their outmost desire for Christmas, which is love.

== Reception ==
Upon its release, Randee Dawn of Today remarked that the song is exactly what one might expect from the singers, writing that it "bounces off each other with full-throated harmonies and high notes alike" and ends with a "big band-sounding flourish that will leave one's heart pounding for more. Reviewing the album for Vulture, Justin Curto highlighted the track as sounding as big as one would expect it to be.

In her review of the track on iHeartRadio, Ariel King wrote that the song proves both the singers' talent and what makes them such "incredible powerhouses" is how they perfectly blend their vocals for "a captivating listen". A.D. Amorosi of Variety wrote that the live version of the song sounds "more lustrous than its studio version", thanks to Clarkson "edgy alto" and Grande "flitting, breezy voice for a surprisingly (for holiday music) improvisational vibe".

Glamour UK listed the song as one of the "Best Christmas Songs Ever". Cosmopolitan listed the song on the best "50 Modern Christmas Songs".

== Live performances ==
On December 1, 2021, the two singers performed the song during Clarkson's When Christmas Comes Around Christmas special which premiered on NBC as promotion for the album.

On December 13, 2022, Clarkson performed the song solo on the twenty-second season finale of The Voice. On December 15, 2022, Clarkson performed the song solo on The Kelly Clarkson Show. On November 30, 2023, Clarkson performed the song solo at the Rockefeller Centre Tree Lighting in New York City, broadcast on NBC.

== Music video ==
A music video was expected to be released.

== Personnel ==
Credits lifted from When Christmas Comes Around... liner notes

- Vocals – Kelly Clarkson, Ariana Grande
- Background vocals – Jessi Collins, Nayanna Holey, Tiffany Palmer, Brandon Winbush
- Producer, keyboards, B3, programming – Jason Halbert
- Engineers – John Hanes, Robert Venable, Tom Peltier, John DeNosky
- Mastering engineer – Chris Gehringer
- Bass – Kyle Whalum
- Drums – Lester Estelle
- Guitars – Aben Eubanks, Jaco Caraco, Luke Sullivant
- Mixer – Serban Ghenea
- Percussion – Ron Sorbo
- Programming (additional) – Rachel Or
- Orchestra arranger and conductor – Joseph Trapanese
- Orchestra contractor – Gina Zimmitti, Witney Martin
- Saxophone – Jesse McGinty
- Trumpet – Mike Cordone, Ray Montiero
- Trombone – Garrett Smith

== Charts ==
Chart performance for "Santa, Can't You Hear Me"
Chart (2022–2025)	Peak position
Australia (ARIA)	38
Austria (Ö3 Austria Top 40)	30
Canada Hot 100 (Billboard)	37
Canada AC (Billboard)	8
Croatia International Airplay (Top lista)	87
Estonia Airplay (TopHit)	36
Germany (GfK)	26
Global 200 (Billboard)	28
Greece International (IFPI)	26
Ireland (IRMA)	13
Italy (FIMI)	91
Lithuania (AGATA)	59
Netherlands (Single Top 100)	31
New Zealand (Recorded Music NZ)	35
Norway (IFPI Norge)	87
Poland (Polish Streaming Top 100)	77
Portugal (AFP)	74
South Korea (Gaon)	165
Sweden (Sverigetopplistan)	98
Switzerland (Schweizer Hitparade)	26
UK Singles (Official Charts)	23
Ukraine Airplay (TopHit)	70
US Billboard Hot 100	31
US Adult Contemporary (Billboard)	11
US Holiday 100 (Billboard)	28

== Certifications ==
Certifications for "Santa, Can't You Hear Me"
Region	Certification	Certified units/sales
New Zealand (RMNZ)	Gold	15,000^{‡}
United Kingdom (BPI)	Gold	400,000^{‡}
^{‡} Sales+streaming figures based on certification alone.

== Release history ==
List of release dates, showing region, release format, catalog, and label
Region	Date	Format(s)	Version	Label	Ref.
Various	October 15, 2021	Streaming	Original	Atlantic	
Various	December 2, 2022	Digital download; streaming	Live	Atlantic	
Various	December 9, 2022	Cassette; CD; flexi disc	Original	Atlantic	
Italy	December 12, 2025	Radio airplay	Original	Warner	
