= Gayle (singer) =

American singer and songwriter (born 2004)

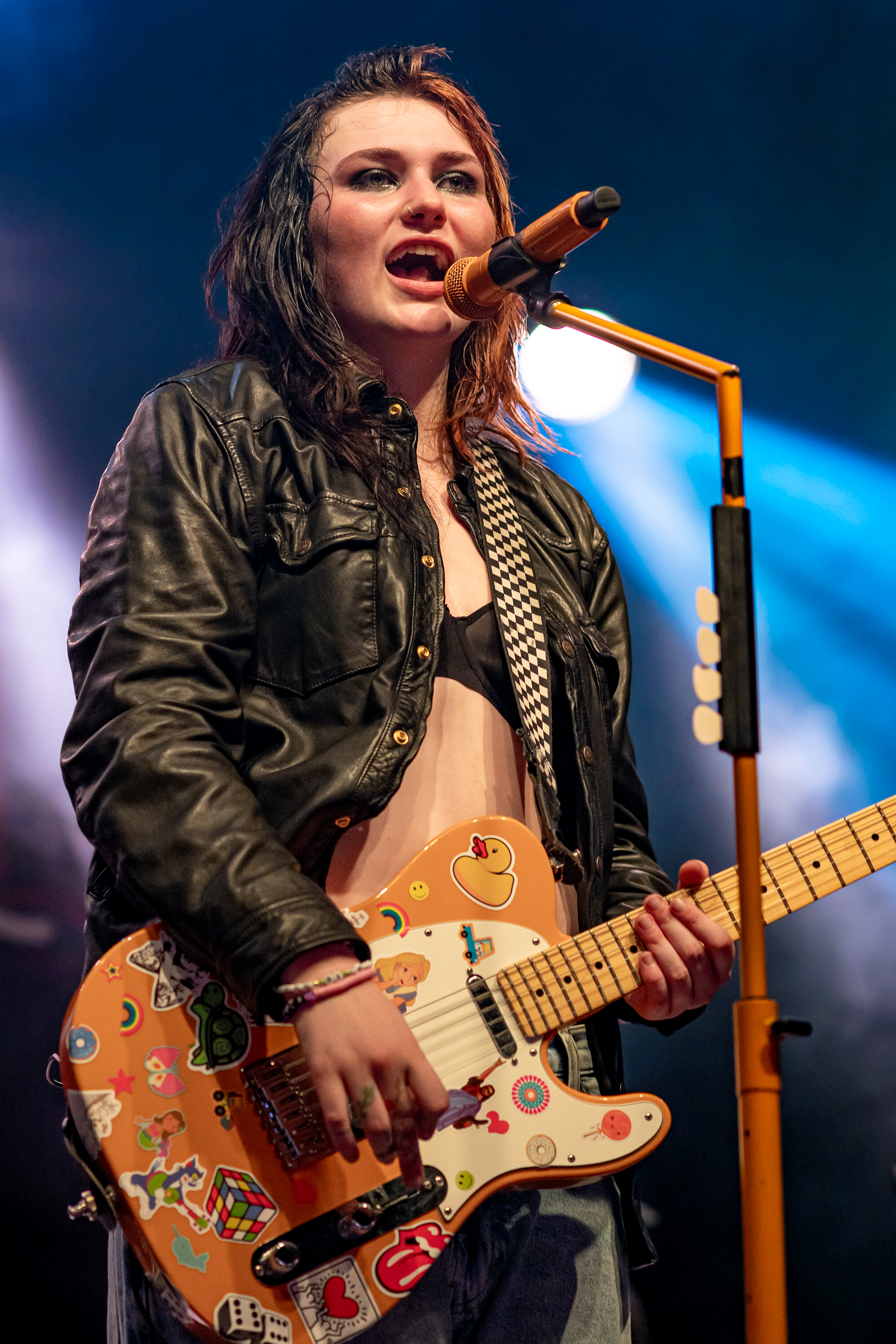
- Gayle performing at El Rey Theatre, Los Angeles, in 2023

Background information
- Born: Taylor Gayle Rutherfurd; June 10, 2004 (age 22)
- Origin: Plano, Texas, U.S.
- Genres: Alternative rock; pop rock
- Occupations: Singer; songwriter
- Years active: 2020–present
- Labels: Arthouse; Atlantic
- Website: gayleofficial.com

Taylor Gayle Rutherfurd (born June 10, 2004) is an American singer and songwriter. After signing with Atlantic Records and Arthouse Entertainment, she released her hit single "ABCDEFU" in 2021, which charted worldwide, including reaching number one in the United Kingdom, Ireland, and on the Billboard Global 200 and earned her a Grammy Award nomination for Song of the Year.

== Early life ==
Taylor Gayle Rutherfurd was born on June 10, 2004, and grew up in Plano, Texas. She started singing at the age of seven and eventually moved to Nashville, Tennessee, to pursue a musical career. She reports that she is dyslexic and has chromesthesia, sound-to-color synesthesia in which sound involuntarily evokes an experience of color.

== Career ==
=== 2020–2022: Beginnings, breakout success and EPs ===
In 2020, she signed her first record deal with Arthouse Entertainment. After releasing several self-produced singles, Gayle was discovered by former American Idol judge and Arthouse music publisher Kara DioGuardi, and was signed to Atlantic Records and Arthouse Records.

In 2021, Gayle released "ABCDEFU", her major-label debut single with Atlantic and Arthouse. It became viral on TikTok and Spotify; "ABCDEFU" peaked at number three on the US Billboard Hot 100. Outside of the United States, "ABCDEFU" topped the charts in Finland, Germany, Ireland, Norway, Sweden, and the United Kingdom, and the top ten in Australia, Austria, New Zealand, and Switzerland.

Gayle subsequently released the song "Ur Just Horny" on January 19, 2022. The cleaned version of the song was released as the title of "Ur Just Lonely" on the same day. On March 18, Gayle released a six-song extended play (EP), titled A Study of the Human Experience Volume One, via Atlantic and Arthouse. On March 19, Gayle was a fill-in host for the Contemporary hit radio version of Ryan Seacrest's American Top 40, where her song "ABCDEFU" spent its first week at number one. On September 19, Gayle announced that she was canceling her Avoiding College Tour.

On October 7 and December 9, Gayle released her second and third EPs, A Study of the Human Experience Volume Two and A Study of the Human Experience Volume Two and a Half, respectively; the latter consists of eight new versions of songs from her previous two EPs.

=== 2023–present: Touring and standalone releases ===
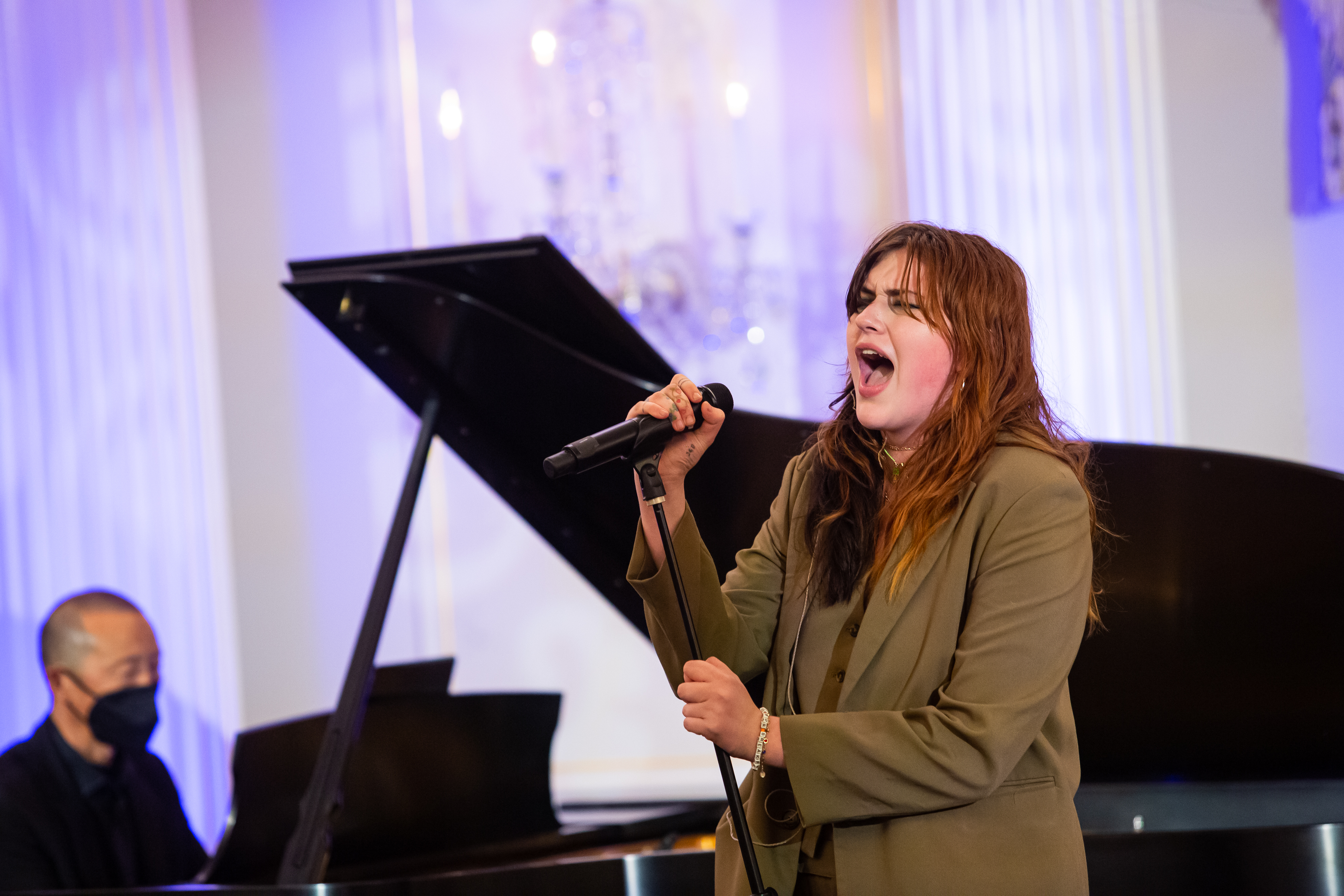
Gayle performing in Washington, D.C., September 2023

On March 9, 2023, Gayle released the standalone single, "Everybody Hates Me". She served as an opening act on multiple shows of the US leg of Taylor Swift's Eras Tour, and on the European leg of Pink's Summer Carnival tour; from March to August and June to July 2023, respectively. She also was a supporting act on the second European leg of the Summer Carnival, in June and July 2024. On April 14, 2023, Lauren Spencer-Smith's "Fantasy", a collaboration with Gayle and Em Beihold, was released as the sixth single from Spencer's debut studio album, Mirror (2023). Gayle co-wrote Kelly Clarkson's 2023 single "Me", which was released on the same day. On May 5, 2023, she released "Don't Call Me Pretty". Gayle performed and co-wrote "Butterflies"—a re-titled "bedroom-pop" rework of the song "Butterfly" by Crazy Town, which it also interpolates—for Barbie the Album, which was released in July. In August, she released the single "Leave Me for Dead". Her next song, "I Don't Sleep as Good as I Used to", followed on October 6. Gayle embarked on her debut headlining tour, the Scared but Trying Tour. It commenced on October 17 in Tampa, Florida and ended on November 15, 2023 in Nashville, Tennessee. Also in November, she released the compilation album Hello This Is the Setlist for My Tour.

Her first release of 2024 was "Kinda Smacks" with Royal & the Serpent in February. From May to June, she conducted her short tour, the My First Time (in Asia) Tour, which consisted of four shows in Asia, including her slot at the Seoul Jazz Fest. On June 28, Gayle released the single "Internet Baby".

== Discography ==
=== Studio albums ===
List of compilation albums, with selected chart positions
| Title | Details |
|---|---|
| Observing Chaos | Released: September 18, 2026; Labels: Atlantic; Format: LP, digital download, streaming |

=== Extended plays ===
List of extended plays, with selected chart positions
| Title | Details | Peak chart positions | | |
| Title | Details | US | CAN | FRA |
|---|---|---|---|---|
| A Study of the Human Experience Volume One | Released: March 18, 2022; Labels: Atlantic, Arthouse; Format: CD, digital download, streaming | 138 | 43 | 110 |
| A Study of the Human Experience Volume Two | Released: October 7, 2022; Labels: Atlantic, Arthouse; Format: CD, digital download, streaming | — | — | — |
| A Study of the Human Experience Volume Two and a Half | Released: December 9, 2022; Labels: Atlantic, Arthouse; Format: Digital download, streaming | — | — | — |
| This Was My Setlist When I Opened up for People This Year | Released: May 12, 2023; Labels: Atlantic; Format: Digital download, streaming | — | — | — |

=== Compilation albums ===
List of compilation albums, with selected chart positions
| Title | Details |
|---|---|
| A Study of the Human Experience Volume One and Two | Released: March 24, 2023; Labels: Atlantic; Format: LP |
| Hello This Is the Setlist for My Tour | Released: November 7, 2023; Labels: Atlantic; Format: Digital download, streaming |

=== Singles ===
==== As lead artist ====
List of singles as lead artist, showing year released and album name
| Title | Year | Peak chart positions | | | | | | | | | | Certifications | Album |
| Title | Year | US | AUS | AUT | CAN | GER | IRE | NZ | SWI | UK | WW | Certifications | Album |
|---|---|---|---|---|---|---|---|---|---|---|---|---|---|
| "Z" | 2020 | — | — | — | — | — | — | — | — | — | — | | Hello This Is the Setlist for My Tour |
| "Dumbass" | 2020 | — | — | — | — | — | — | — | — | — | — | | Non-album singles |
| "Happy for You" | 2020 | — | — | — | — | — | — | — | — | — | — | | Non-album singles |
| "Orange Peel" | 2020 | — | — | — | — | — | — | — | — | — | — | | Hello This Is the Setlist for My Tour |
| "ABCDEFU" | 2021 | 3 | 2 | 1 | 2 | 1 | 1 | 3 | 1 | 1 | 1 | RIAA: 4× Platinum; ARIA: 3× Platinum; BPI: Platinum; BVMI: 3× Gold; IFPI AUT: 3× Platinum; MC: 4× Platinum; RMNZ: Platinum | A Study of the Human Experience Volume One |
| "Ur Just Horny" | 2022 | — | — | — | — | — | — | — (Note: "Ur Just Horny" did not enter the NZ Top 40 Singles Chart, but peaked at number six on the NZ Hot Singles Chart.) | — | — | — | | A Study of the Human Experience Volume One |
| "Don't Trip" (with Justus Bennetts) | 2022 | — | — | — | — | — | — | — | — | — | — | | Non-album single |
| "Indieedgycool" | 2022 | — | — | — | — | — | — | — | — | — | — | | A Study of the Human Experience Volume Two |
| "God Has a Sense of Humor" | 2022 | — | — | — | — | — | — | — | — | — | — | | A Study of the Human Experience Volume Two |
| "Snow Angels" | 2022 | — | — | — | — | — | — | — | — | — | — | | A Study of the Human Experience Volume Two |
| "FMK" (with Blackbear) | 2022 | — | — | — | — | — | — | — | — | — | — | | A Study of the Human Experience Volume Two |
| "Everybody Hates Me" | 2023 | — | — | — | — | — | — | — | — | — | — | | This Was My Setlist When I Opened up for People This Year |
| "Don't Call Me Pretty" | 2023 | — | — | — | — | — | — | — | — | — | — | | This Was My Setlist When I Opened up for People This Year |
| "Leave Me for Dead" | 2023 | — | — | — | — | — | — | — | — | — | — | | Hello This Is the Setlist for My Tour |
| "I Don't Sleep as Good as I Used To" | 2023 | — | — | — | — | — | — | — | — | — | — | | Hello This Is the Setlist for My Tour |
| "Internet Baby" | 2024 | — | — | — | — | — | — | — | — | — | — | | Non-album single |
| "Junebug!" | 2026 | — | — | — | — | — | — | — | — | — | — | | Observing Chaos |
| "loving you is" | 2026 | — | — | — | — | — | — | — | — | — | — | | Observing Chaos |
| "bite the bullet" | 2026 | — | — | — | — | — | — | — | — | — | — | | Observing Chaos |
"—" denotes a single that did not chart or was not released in that territory.

==== As featured artist ====
List of singles as featured artist, showing year released and album name
| Title | Year | Album |
|---|---|---|
| "Oscar Nominated" (James Droll featuring Gayle) | 2021 | Non-album single |

==== Promotional singles ====
List of promotional singles, with year released, selected chart positions, and album name shown
| Title | Year | Album |
|---|---|---|
| "Butterflies" | 2023 | Barbie the Album |

== Tours ==
=== Headlining ===
- The FU Tour
- Scared but Trying Tour (2023)
- (My First Time) in Asia Tour (2024)

=== Supporting ===
- Winnetka Bowling League – Live on Tour (2021)
- Tate McRae – Tate McRae Live on Tour (2022)
- AJR – OK Orchestra Tour (2022)
- My Chemical Romance – Reunion Tour (2022)
- Taylor Swift – The Eras Tour (2023)
- Pink – Summer Carnival (2023–2024)
- Cyndi Lauper — Girls Just Wanna Have Fun Farewell Tour (2024)

== Awards and nominations ==
| Year | Award | Category | Work | Result | Ref. |
|---|---|---|---|---|---|
| 2022 | American Music Awards | New Artist of the Year | Herself | Nominated | |
| 2022 | Billboard Music Awards | Top Viral Song | "ABCDEFU" | Nominated | |
| 2022 | Danish Music Awards | International Hit of the Year | "ABCDEFU" | Nominated | |
| 2022 | Los 40 Music Awards | Best International New Artist | Herself | Nominated | |
| 2022 | MTV Europe Music Awards | Best New Act | Herself | Nominated | |
| 2022 | MTV Millennial Awards | Global Hit of the Year | "ABCDEFU" | Nominated | |
| 2022 | MTV Video Music Awards | Best New Artist | Herself | Nominated | |
| 2022 | MTV Video Music Awards | Push Performance of the Year | "ABCDEFU" | Nominated | |
| 2022 | NRJ Music Awards | International Hit of the Year | "ABCDEFU" | Nominated | |
| 2022 | NRJ Music Awards | International Revelation of the Year | Herself | Nominated | |
| 2022 | People's Choice Awards | New Artist of 2022 | Herself | Nominated | |
| 2023 | Grammy Awards | Song of the Year | "ABCDEFU" | Nominated | |
| 2023 | Kids' Choice Awards | Favorite Breakout Artist | Herself | Nominated | |
| 2023 | Circle Chart Music Awards | International Rising Star | Herself | Won | |
| 2023 | iHeartRadio Music Awards | Best New Pop Artist | Herself | Nominated | |
| 2023 | iHeartRadio Music Awards | Social Star Award | Herself | Nominated | |
| 2023 | iHeartRadio Music Awards | Best Lyrics | "ABCDEFU" | Nominated | |
| 2023 | APRA Music Awards | Most Performed International Work of the Year | "ABCDEFU" | Nominated | |
