= Where Have You Been (Kelly Clarkson song) =

2025 single by Kelly Clarkson

Single by Kelly Clarkson
- Released: May 2, 2025
- Length: 3:57
- Label: High Road
- Songwriters: Kelly Clarkson; Jaco Caraco
- Producer: Jaco Caraco

Kelly Clarkson singles chronology
"DJ Play a Christmas Song" (remix) (2024)	"Where Have You Been" (2025)	"I'd Be Lyin'" (2026)

Music video
- "Where Have You Been" on YouTube

"Where Have You Been" is a song by American singer-songwriter Kelly Clarkson. It was released on May 2, 2025, by High Road Records. It was written by the artist alongside its producer, Jaco Caraco. It is Clarkson's first independent release following her departure from Atlantic Records.

== Background and release ==
On January 22, 2025, during an episode of her talk show with guest Keke Palmer, Clarkson revealed she had started her own record label; in addition, she previewed the release of new music, expressing she had "earned the moment". Three months later, Clarkson announced the single on her social media accounts.

On May 1, 2025, Clarkson exclusively premiered her song on her SiriusXM channel, the Kelly Clarkson Connection a day before it was released worldwide. The song was written by Clarkson along with her guitarist Jaco Caraco, who also produced the track. It was inspired by Meryl Streep and Martin Short's characters on the Hulu comedy series Only Murders in the Building.

== Critical reception ==
Pop Crush's Donny Meacham remarked the "soul-baring" lyrical content of the song was a "painful reminder of abandonment".

== Music video ==
Clarkson premiered the music video for "Where Have You Been" on her talk show on May 2, 2025. It was filmed in Montana and was directed by Weiss Eubanks and Jonny Mars.

== Live performance ==
On May 6, 2025, Clarkson performed the song on Today as part of their Citi Concert Series. Fourteen days later, the song was performed during the twenty-seventh season finale of The Voice.

== Charts ==
Chart performance
Chart (2025)	Peak position
Australia Digital Tracks (ARIA)	24
UK Singles Sales (OCC)	54
US Digital Song Sales (Billboard)	2
