= Mine (Kelly Clarkson song) =

Single by Kelly Clarkson

from the album Chemistry
- A-side: "Me"
- Released: April 14, 2023
- Recorded: 2020
- Studio: The Ribcage (Los Angeles, CA); Germano Studios (New York, NY)
- Genre: Pop
- Length: 3:11
- Label: Atlantic
- Songwriters: Kelly Clarkson; Eric Serna; Jesse Shatkin
- Producers: Jesse Shatkin; Eric Serna

Kelly Clarkson singles chronology
"Santa, Can't You Hear Me" (2022)	"Mine" / "Me" (2023)	"Favorite Kind of High" (2023)

Lyric video
- "Mine" on YouTube

"Mine" is a song by American pop singer Kelly Clarkson, from her tenth studio album, Chemistry (2023). Accompanied with "Me", it was released on April 14, 2023, by Atlantic Records as the lead double A-side single. It was written by Clarkson, Eric Serna, Jesse Shatkin, and produced by Serna and Shatkin.

== Composition ==
"Mine" was written by Clarkson, Eric Serna, and Clarkson's frequent collaborator Jesse Shatkin, with production by Serna and Shatkin. Clarkson wrote the song following her divorce in 2020.

== Release and promotion ==
"Mine" was released as a double A-side lead single along with "Me" by Atlantic on April 14, 2023. Clarkson explained the reason behind the release saying, "we decided to release 'Mine' and 'Me' at the same time because I didn't want to release just one song to represent an entire album, or relationship."

=== Live performances ===
Clarkson debuted the song on her talk show on April 18, 2023.

She then performed the song, in addition to the whole the entire Chemistry album at the Belasco Theatre in Los Angeles on April 24, 2023 to help celebrate the release of the album.

Clarkson also performed the song during her fourteen night Las Vegas residency, Chemistry: An Intimate Evening with Kelly Clarkson.

On September 22, 2023, Clarkson performed the song on The Today Show. She then performed the song at the iHeartRadio Music Festival in Las Vegas on September 23, 2023.

== Critical response ==
Lindsay Zoladz of The New York Times called the song "biting," writing that it "effectively taps into anger and a desire for revenge." Jackie Manno of NBC Insider wrote, "the intimate lyrics follow Kelly Clarkson's emotional process of healing from a former deep connection. The verses are delivered with nuanced instrumentation and hushed vocals. The chorus then reaches an intense climax, and Clarkson provides some powerful belted notes as she does best." Euphoria Magazine's Nmesoma Okechuku said, ""Mine" is literally what you get when a broken heart starts to sing."

== Track listing ==
7-inch single

1. "Mine" – 3:11
2. "Me" – 3:35

Ty Sunderland Remix

- "Mine" (Ty Sunderland Remix) – 4:01

== Personnel ==
- Nathan Cimino – engineer
- Kelly Clarkson – lead vocals
- Samuel Dent – engineer
- Chris Gehringer – mastering
- Serban Ghenea – mixing
- Jason Halbert – vocal production
- Nich Jones – engineer
- Garret Ray – bass
- Eric Serna – bass, guitar, producer
- Jesse Shatkin – engineer, keyboards, producer, strings

== Charts ==
=== Weekly charts ===
Weekly chart performance for "Mine"
Chart (2023)	Peak position
Australia Digital Tracks (ARIA)	22
Canada AC (Billboard)	26
Canada Digital Songs (Billboard)	15
New Zealand Hot Singles (RMNZ)	36
South Korea BGM (Circle)	149
UK Singles Downloads (OCC)	42
UK Singles Sales (OCC)	43
US Adult Contemporary (Billboard)	11
US Adult Pop Airplay (Billboard)	10
US Digital Song Sales (Billboard)	10

=== Year-end charts ===
Year-end chart performance for "Mine"
Chart (2023)	Position
US Adult Contemporary (Billboard)	22
US Adult Top 40 (Billboard)	33

== Release history ==
List of releases of "Mine"
Region	Date	Format	Version	Label	Ref.
Various	April 14, 2023	Digital download; streaming	Original	Atlantic	
United States	April 24, 2023	Adult contemporary radio	Original	Atlantic; 3EE	
Various	May 5, 2023	Digital download; streaming	Ty Sunderland Remix	Atlantic	
United States	August 25, 2023	7” vinyl	Original	Atlantic; 3EE	
