= Favorite Kind of High =

Single by Kelly Clarkson

from the album Chemistry
- Released: May 19, 2023
- Recorded: 2020
- Studio: The Ribcage (Los Angeles, CA); Germano Studios (New York, NY)
- Length: 2:55
- Label: Atlantic
- Songwriters: Kelly Clarkson; Carly Rae Jepsen; Jesse Shatkin
- Producer: Jesse Shatkin

Kelly Clarkson singles chronology
"Mine" / "Me" (2023)	"Favorite Kind of High" (2023)	"You for Christmas" (2024)

Live video
- "Favorite Kind of High" on YouTube

"Favorite Kind of High" is a song by American pop singer Kelly Clarkson. It was released on May 19, 2023, by Atlantic Records as the second single from her tenth studio album, Chemistry (2023). It was written by Clarkson, Carly Rae Jepsen and Jesse Shatkin with production by the latter. The music video was filmed during Clarkson's show at the Belasco Theatre on April 24, 2023. The David Guetta remix version of the song was released on May 24, 2023.

== Composition ==
"Favorite Kind of High" was written by Clarkson, Carly Rae Jepsen and Jesse Shatkin with production by Shatkin. Clarkson wanted her Chemistry album to cover the entire arch of a relationship, this is why it also includes happier songs. She describes the song as a "sexy-ass song" and how it's about "that high when you first see someone and you're like 'Oh, shit.'"

== Critical response ==
Billboards's Rania Aniftos says that the song "details the fun, breathless exhilaration of meeting someone special." Nmesoma Okechuku of Euphoria Magazine praised Clarkson's "insane vocals." The Musical Hype gave the song four stars. Brent Faulkner aka the musical hype said, "As always, Kelly Clarkson is impressive in the vocal department. She is particularly strong once she ascends into that powerful, upper register. The theme is simple but relatable: being so taken with someone that you're willing to give into them without a hitch."

== Music video ==
The music video for "Favorite Kind of High" was shot during Clarkson's show at the Belasco Theatre on April 24, 2023. It was directed by Weiss Eubanks and Jonny Mars.

The lyric video for the David Guetta remix version of the song features Clarkson's daughter, River.

== Personnel ==
- Kelly Clarkson – vocals
- Chris Gehringer – mastering
- Serban Ghenea – mixing
- Jason Halbert – co-producer
- Garret Ray – drums
- Jesse Shatkin – keyboards, percussion, producer, programming, synthesizer
- Jake Sinclair – additional producer, bass guitar, guitar

== Charts ==
Chart performance for "Favorite Kind of High"
Chart (2023)	Peak position
South Korea BGM (Circle)	114

== Release history ==
"Favorite Kind of High" release history
Region	Date	Format	Version	Label	Ref.
Various	May 19, 2023	Digital download; streaming	Original	Atlantic	
Various	May 24, 2023	Digital download; streaming	David Guetta remix	Atlantic	
