= Me (Kelly Clarkson song) =

Single by Kelly Clarkson

from the album Chemistry
- A-side: "Mine"
- Released: April 14, 2023
- Recorded: 2020
- Studio: The Listening Station (Universal City, CA); Off the Wall Studios (Nashville, TN); The Ribcage (Los Angeles, CA)
- Genre: Pop
- Length: 3:35
- Label: Atlantic
- Songwriters: Kelly Clarkson; Taylor Rutherford; Josh Ronen
- Producers: Jason Halbert; Jesse Shatkin

Kelly Clarkson singles chronology
"Santa, Can't You Hear Me" (2022)	"Mine" / "Me" (2023)	"Favorite Kind of High" (2023)

Lyric video
- "Me" on YouTube

"Me" is a song by American pop singer Kelly Clarkson, from her tenth studio album, Chemistry (2023). Accompanied with "Mine", it was released on April 14, 2023, by Atlantic Records as the lead double A-side single. It was written by Clarkson, Gayle, and Josh Ronen with production by Jason Halbert and Jesse Shatkin.

== Composition ==
"Me" was first written by Gayle and Josh Ronen, who wrote the first verse and chorus. When Clarkson told Atlantic that she was a fan of Gayle's they told her that she was their artist. Atlantic then sent Clarkson the song. In one night, Clarkson finished the rest of the song. It was produced by Jason Halbert and Jesse Shatkin.

== Release and promotion ==
"Me" was released as a double A-side lead single along with "Mine" by Atlantic on April 14, 2023. Clarkson explained the reason behind the release saying, "We decided to release 'Mine' and 'Me' at the same time because I didn't want to release just one song to represent an entire album, or relationship." The song was sampled on the 2024 single "Survivor's Remorse" released by Roddy Ricch.

== Charts ==
Chart performance for "Me"
Chart (2023)	Peak position
Australia Digital Tracks (ARIA)	7
Canada Digital Songs (Billboard)	16
UK Singles Downloads (OCC)	34
UK Singles Sales (OCC)	35
US Digital Song Sales (Billboard)	6

== Release history ==
List of releases of "Me"
Region	Date	Format	Label	Ref.
Various	April 14, 2023	Digital download; streaming	Atlantic	
United States	August 25, 2023	7” vinyl	Atlantic; 3EE	
