= Piece by Piece Remixed =

Remix album by Kelly Clarkson
- Released: March 4, 2016
- Recorded: 2015–2016
- Genre: EDM
- Length: 36:40
- Labels: RCA; 19
- Producers: Greg Kurstin; Jason Halbert; Lenno; Vicetone; Frank Pole; Rytmeklubben; Richard Cutmore; Young Bombs; Kolaj; Cheat Codes

Kelly Clarkson chronology
Piece by Piece (2015)	Piece by Piece Remixed (2016)	Meaning of Life (2017)

Piece by Piece Remixed is the first remix album by American singer Kelly Clarkson, released by RCA Records on March 4, 2016. It contains various remixes and re-recordings of selections from her seventh studio album, Piece by Piece (2015), including two Billboard Dance Club Songs hit singles ("Heartbeat Song" and "Invincible"), the "Idol version" of the title track, "Piece by Piece", and a live recording of "Tightrope" at the Piece by Piece Tour. Released exclusively in digital download and music streaming platforms, it became her first entry on the Billboard Dance/Electronic Albums chart at number one with digital sales of 2,000 copies. This is Clarkson's last album released through RCA.

== Background and release ==
In a 2015 interview with Time, Clarkson revealed that she had commissioned club remixes of the tracks from her seventh studio album Piece by Piece (2015) as part of their discussion of foraying into different genres—including a possible dance music album. Some of these tracks include "Heartbeat Song", "Take You High", and "Dance with Me", with the intention of releasing them to music clubs in the future. Following a successful response of her rendition of the title track, "Piece by Piece", on the final season of the television competition series American Idol on February 25, 2016, Clarkson immediately recorded a studio version of her performance and sub-named it the "Idol Version", which was released on February 29, 2016. On that same day, RCA Records announced the release of Piece by Piece Remixed on March 4, 2016, in honor of studio album's anniversary of release in the United States. Containing selections of remixed tracks from Piece by Piece, the remix album is book-ended by the "Idol Version" of the title track and a live recording of "Tightrope" at the Piece by Piece Tour as its opening and closing songs. It also contains two Billboard Dance Club Songs hit singles—"Heartbeat Song:, which peaked at number one; and "Invincible", which peaked at number two.

== Commercial performance ==
Piece by Piece Remixed made its debut chart appearance at the top of the US Billboard Dance/Electronic Albums chart in its issue dated March 26, 2016, marking Clarkson's first entry on the chart. Debuting with 2,000 copies of digital album sales. Piece by Piece Remixed was also the first remix album to debut at the top of the Dance/Electronic Albums chart in two years after The White Album by Hillsong United entered at the top in March 2014.

== Track listing ==
Piece by Piece Remixed track listing
No.	Title	Writer(s)	Producer(s)/Remixer(s)	Length
1.	"Piece by Piece" (Idol version)	Kelly Clarkson; Greg Kurstin	Kurstin; Jason Halbert	3:32
2.	"Heartbeat Song" (Lenno Remix)	Kara DioGuardi; Jason Evigan; Audra Mae; Mitch Allan	Lenno Linjama	3:17
3.	"Invincible" (Vicetone Remix)	Sia Furler; Jesse Shatkin; Stephen Mostyn; Warren "Oak" Felder	Vicetone	3:24
4.	"Someone" (Frank Pole Remix)	Matthew Koma	Frank Pole	3:27
5.	"Take You High" (Rytmeklubben by Henrik The Artist & Torjus)	Shatkin; Maureen "Mozella" McDonald	Rytmeklubben (Henrik The Artist & Torjus)	4:07
6.	"Let Your Tears Fall" (Cutmore Remix)	Furler; Kurstin	Cutmore	3:51
7.	"Dance with Me" (Young Bombs Remix)	Dan Rockett	Young Bombs (Martin Kottmeier and Tristan Norton)	4:12
8.	"Nostalgic" (Mighty Mike & Teesa aka Kolaj Remix)	Justin Tranter; Ryland Blackinton; Dan Keyes; Vaughn Oliver	Kolaj (Mighty Mike & Teesa)	3:14
9.	"Second Wind" (Cheat Codes Remix)	Chris DeStefano; Shane McAnally; Maren Morris	Cheat Codes (Matthew Russell, Trevor Dahl & Kevin Ford)	3:38
10.	"Tightrope" (Tour Version)	Clarkson; Kurstin	Halbert	3:55
Total length:				36:40

== Charts ==
Chart (2016)	Peak position
US Top Dance Albums (Billboard)	1

== Release history ==
List of release dates, showing region, formats, label, editions, catalog number and reference
Region	Date	Format(s)	Label	Catalog number	Ref
Various	March 4, 2016	Digital download	RCA; 19; Sony Music	886445766462	

== See also ==
- List of Billboard number-one electronic albums of 2016
