= Jason Halbert =

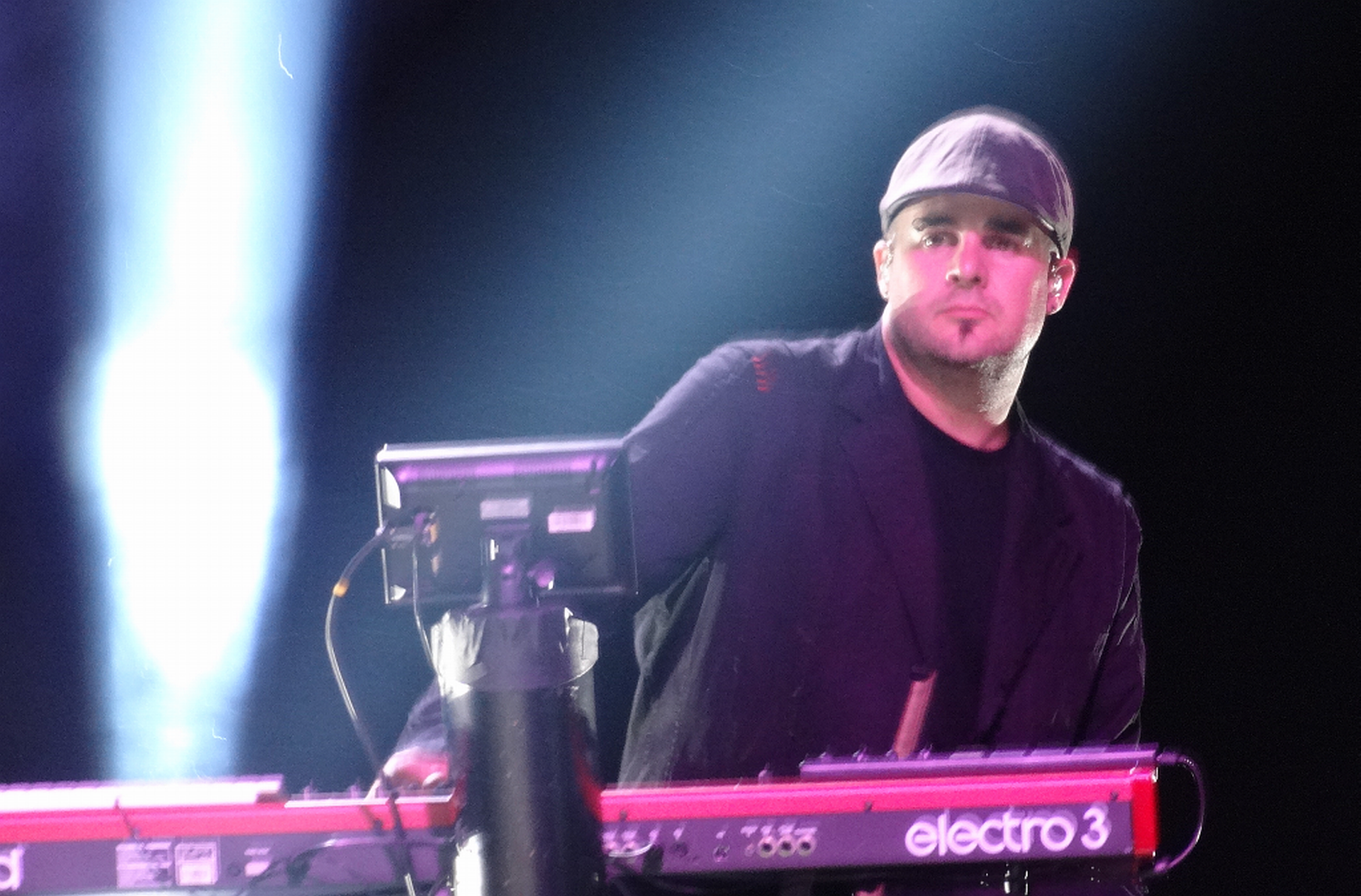
- Jason Halbert, Shea's Performing Arts Center, Buffalo NY.Kelly Clarkson Microsoft Show

Background information
- Born: June 3, 1974 (age 52)
- Origin: Port Arthur, Texas, U.S.
- Genres: Pop
- Occupations: Musical director; musician; record producer; songwriter
- Instruments: Piano; electronic keyboard; keytar
- Years active: 1994–present
- Website: Official website

Jason Halbert (born June 3, 1974) is an American producer, music director, musician, engineer, and songwriter.

Halbert has served as music director for Kelly Clarkson, Nick Carter, Clay Aiken, and Justin Guarini, as well as touring as keyboardist for Paulina Rubio and Reba McEntire.

== Biography ==
In 1994, Halbert began his music career as keyboardist for DC Talk.

In 1997, Halbert was a founding member of the band Zilch, which was renamed to SonicFlood in 1998.

In 2003, Halbert became Kelly Clarkson's music director, shortly after her American Idol win.

In 2013, in his role as a record producer, Halbert won a Grammy for his contributions to the Kelly Clarkson album Stronger, which also won the Grammy for Best Pop Vocal album.

As a songwriter, Halbert has co-written several songs with Clarkson, including Catch My Breath and "Cry". "Cry" was featured in the Glee Season Three episode "Choke", performed by Lea Michele.

In 2016, Halbert produced "Piece by Piece" (Idol Version) and also accompanied Clarkson on piano for the recording. The song was nominated for a Grammy in the Best Pop Solo Performance category.

Along with Todd Mark Evans, Jason has been part of the Nashville-based duo the Brezhnev Society.

Halbert has been noted as an early adopter of Ableton Live in his live performances with artists.

In 2024, Halbert and his wife, Rhonda, published their first book, Caretaker (2024), under the penname R.J. Halbert. In 2025, they released a sequel, Servant (2025).

== Discography ==
Year	Artist	Album	Title	Credit	Notes
1995	DC Talk	Jesus Freak	"In the Light"	Arranger	
1996	The Gotee Brothers	Erace	"Celia (Queen of the Senseless World)"	Hammond B3	
1996	The Gotee Brothers	Erace	"New South"	Rhodes piano	
1997	DC Talk	Welcome to the Freak Show		Keyboards	
1997	Zilch	Platinum		Hammond B3, moog, synthesizer, vocals	
1999	Out of Eden	No Turning Back		Keyboards	
1999	Sonicflood	Sonicflood	"Holy One"	Writer	
1999	Sonicflood	Sonicflood	"My Refuge"	Writer	
1999	Sonicflood	Sonicflood	"Carried Away"	Writer	
1999	Sonicflood	Sonicflood	"I Need You"	Writer	
2001	Petra	Revival		Co-producer, keyboards, programming, background Vocals	
2001	Sonicflood	Sonicpraise		Producer, keyboards, engineer	
2001	Tim Hughes	Here I Am to Worship		Producer, keyboards, Hammond B3, programming	
2001	Tim Hughes	Here I Am to Worship	"Here I Am to Worship"	Mixer	
2001	Tim Hughes, Paul Oakley, Matt Redman, Neil Wilson	All Around the World		Co-producer	
2002	Rita Springer	Effortless		Engineer, mixer	
2004	David Ruis	Every Move I Make		Producer, mixer, keyboards, programming	
2004	Kelly Clarkson	Breakaway	"Beautiful Disaster (live)"	Piano	
2005	Bascom Hill	Maybe		Hammond B3	
2005	Tremolo	Love Is the Greatest Revenge	"Evil Town"	Hammond B3	
2006	Loni Rose	Shine		Keyboards	
2006	Bill Madden	Gone		Hammond B3	
2007	Bleu Edmondson	Lost Boy		Hammond B3	
2007	Kelly Clarkson	My December		Co-producer, keyboards, programming	
2007	Kelly Clarkson	My December	"Haunted"	Writer	
2009	Kelly Clarkson	All I Ever Wanted	"Cry"	Writer	
2009	Kelly Clarkson	All I Ever Wanted	"Ready"	Writer	
2011	Kelly Clarkson	Stronger			
2011	Kelly Clarkson	Stronger	"You Love Me"	Vocal producer	Won the Best Pop Vocal Album Grammy
2011	Kelly Clarkson	Stronger	"Standing in Front of You"	Producer	Won the Best Pop Vocal Album Grammy
2011	Kelly Clarkson	Stronger	"Hello"	Vocal producer	Won the Best Pop Vocal Album Grammy
2011	Kelly Clarkson	Stronger	"Let Me Down"	Vocal producer	Won the Best Pop Vocal Album Grammy
2011	Kelly Clarkson	Stronger	"You Can't Win"	Vocal producer	Won the Best Pop Vocal Album Grammy
2011	Kelly Clarkson	iTunes Session		Producer, piano	
2011	Kelly Clarkson	The Smoakstack Sessions v.1		Producer, mixer, programming, piano, Hammond B3, wurlitzer	
2011	Newsboys	Born Again: Miracles Edition	"Save Your Life"	Producer, keyboards, programming	
2011	Rita Springer	The Playlist			
2011	Rita Springer	The Playlist	"Come In"	Writer	
2011	Rita Springer	The Playlist	"Make You Happy"	Producer, keyboards	
2011	Rita Springer	The Playlist	"I Call You"	Producer, keyboards, programming	
2011	Rita Springer	The Playlist	"Over I Go"	Producer, keyboards, bass	
2011	Rita Springer	The Playlist	"Made for This"	Mixer	
2011	Rita Springer	The Playlist	"The One"	Mixer	
2011	Rita Springer	The Playlist	"Falling"	Producer, keyboards	
2011	Robert Pierre	I'm All In		Mixer	
2012	Kelly Clarkson	Greatest Hits — Chapter One	"Catch My Breath"	Writer, keyboards, programming	
2012	Kelly Clarkson	Greatest Hits — Chapter One	"People Like Us"	Production manager	
2012	Kelly Clarkson	The Smoakstack Sessions v.2		Producer, mixer	
2013	Kelly Clarkson	Wrapped in Red	"Every Christmas"	Vocal producer	
2013	Kelly Clarkson	Wrapped in Red	"I'll Be Home For Christmas"	Mixer, piano, strings, programming	
2015	Kelly Clarkson	Piece by Piece	"Heartbeat Song"	Vocal Producer	Nominated for Best Pop Vocal Album Grammy
2015	Kelly Clarkson	Piece by Piece	"Someone"	Vocal producer	Nominated for Best Pop Vocal Album Grammy
2015	Kelly Clarkson	Piece by Piece	"Run Run Run"	Producer, keyboards	Nominated for Best Pop Vocal Album Grammy
2015	Kelly Clarkson	Piece by Piece	"War Paint"	Producer, programming, keyboards, bass	Nominated for Best Pop Vocal Album Grammy
2015	Kelly Clarkson	Piece by Piece	"Nostalgic"	Producer, programming, keyboards, bass	Nominated for Best Pop Vocal Album Grammy
2015	Kelly Clarkson	Piece by Piece	"Good Goes the Bye"	Producer, programming, keyboards	Nominated for Best Pop Vocal Album Grammy
2015	Kelly Clarkson	Piece by Piece	"Second Wind"	Vocal producer	Nominated for Best Pop Vocal Album Grammy
2015	Ben Haenow	Ben Haenow	"Second Hand Heart" feat. Kelly Clarkson	Vocal producer	
2016	Kelly Clarkson	—N/a	"Piece by Piece (Idol Version)"	Producer, Piano	Nominated for Best Pop Solo Performance Grammy
2016	Kelly Clarkson	The Hamilton Mixtape	"It's Quiet Uptown"	Producer	
2017	Kelly Clarkson	The Shack: Music From and Inspired by the Original Motion Picture	"Love Goes On"	Vocal producer	
2017	Kelly Clarkson	Meaning of Life	"Cruel"	Producer, engineer, keyboards, programming	
2017	Kelly Clarkson		"Christmas Eve"	Writer, producer, engineer, organ, piano	
2018	Dan + Shay	Dan + Shay	"Keeping Score" feat. Kelly Clarkson	Assistant, vocal engineer	
2018	Kelly Clarkson	The Greatest Showman: Reimagined	"Never Enough"	Vocal producer	
2021	Kelly Clarkson	When Christmas Comes Around...	"Christmas Isn't Canceled (Just You)"	Writer, producer	
2021	Kelly Clarkson	When Christmas Comes Around...	"Merry Christmas (To the One I used to Know)"	Writer, producer	
2021	Kelly Clarkson	When Christmas Comes Around...	"Glow" feat. Chris Stapleton	Writer, producer	
2021	Kelly Clarkson	When Christmas Comes Around...	"Santa Baby"	Producer	
2021	Kelly Clarkson	When Christmas Comes Around...	"Santa Can't You Hear Me" feat. Ariana Grande	Producer	
2021	Kelly Clarkson	When Christmas Comes Around...	"Last Christmas"	Producer	
2021	Kelly Clarkson	When Christmas Comes Around...	"Blessed"	Producer	
2021	Kelly Clarkson	When Christmas Comes Around...	"Christmas Comes Early"	Producer	
