= Piece by Piece (Kelly Clarkson album) =

- Standard version artwork. The deluxe version artwork has a similar kaleidoscopic design, but uses a photograph of Clarkson staring to her left.

Studio album by Kelly Clarkson
- Released: February 27, 2015
- Recorded: 2013–14
- Studios: EastWest Studios; Echo Studio; The Rib Cage; The Attic; The Dressing Room; The Listening Station; Ocean Way; Starstruck Studios; Sub-Level 03 Studios; Germano Studios
- Genres: Electropop; orchestral pop; power pop; EDM
- Length: 50:31
- Labels: RCA; 19
- Producers: Chris DeStefano; Jason Halbert; Greg Kurstin; Eric Olson; Jesse Shatkin

Kelly Clarkson chronology
Wrapped in Red (2013)	Piece by Piece (2015)	Piece by Piece Remixed (2016)

Singles from Piece by Piece
- 1. "Heartbeat Song" Released: January 12, 2015; 2. "Invincible" Released: May 18, 2015; 3. "Piece by Piece" Released: November 9, 2015

Piece by Piece is the seventh studio album by American pop singer Kelly Clarkson. It was released on February 27, 2015, by RCA Records. It was her final studio album under her recording contract with the label, to which she signed after winning the first season of American Idol in 2002. She then made the switch to Atlantic in 2016. The album saw Clarkson reuniting with frequent collaborators Greg Kurstin, Jesse Shatkin, Jason Halbert, Eric Olson, and Chris DeStefano. She also gathered material from songwriters such as Sia, Matthew Koma, MoZella, Bonnie McKee, David Jost, Semi Precious Weapons lead singer Justin Tranter, and former Cobra Starship member Ryland Blackinton, among others. Inspired by the orchestral production on Wrapped in Red, Clarkson wanted all the songs on Piece by Piece to resonate like its own film soundtrack, taking a cue from the soundtracks of the feature motion pictures Cruel Intentions (1999) and Love Actually (2003) and commissioning orchestral arrangements by Joseph Trapanese.

Piece by Piece is illustrated as a concept record telling a single story, using themes of heartbreak, personal struggles, peace, and empowerment. The music of Piece by Piece consists of electropop, orchestral pop, power pop and electronic dance music, marking a departure from the predominant pop rock sound of her previous studio albums. Piece by Piece was released to positive reception from music critics, who applauded Clarkson's vocal performances. Criticism mainly targeted the album's production, as well as its belaboring on midtempo arrangements. Piece by Piece gave Clarkson a total of three Grammy Award nominations. It became her fourth work to be nominated for the Best Pop Vocal Album, giving her the record for the most-nominated artist in the category. Both "Heartbeat Song" and "Piece by Piece" were also nominated for the Best Pop Solo Performance.

Commercially, Piece by Piece became Clarkson's third album to debut at number one on the Billboard 200 chart in the United States. Internationally, it also reached the top ten in Australia, Canada, Ireland, Scotland and the United Kingdom. The album's lead single, "Heartbeat Song", peaked at number 21 on the Billboard Hot 100 chart and became her ninth top-ten hit on the UK Singles Chart. "Invincible" was released as the second single to a minor chart success. The third and final single, "Piece by Piece", debuted at number eight on the Billboard Hot 100, becoming her eleventh top-ten single in the United States. The album's supporting tour, the Piece by Piece Tour, began on July 11, 2015. On March 4, 2016, RCA Records released Piece by Piece Remixed, which contains remixed versions of ten of the tracks from the album.

== Background and recording ==
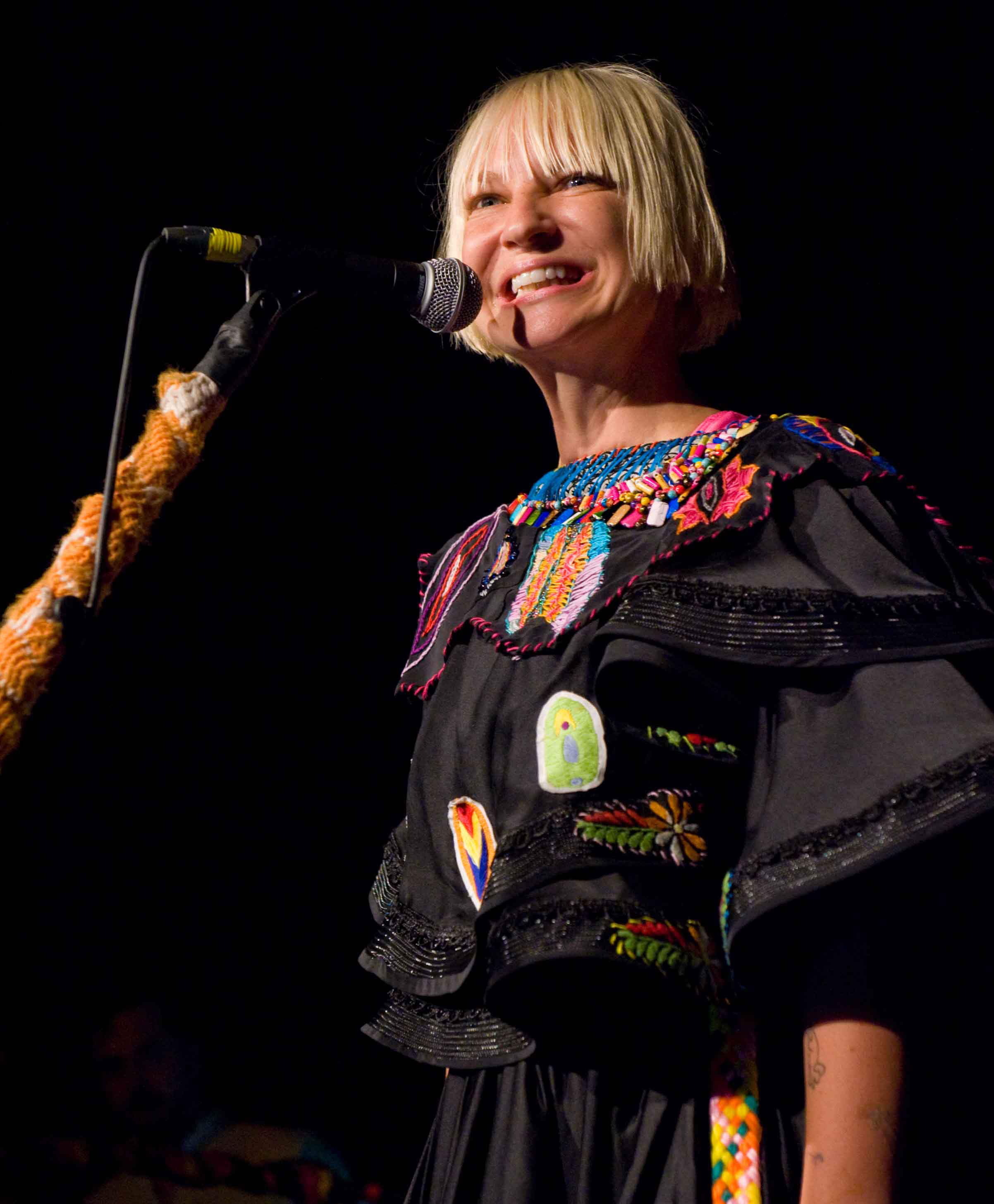
Sia (pictured) co-wrote both the first song and the last track recorded for Piece by Piece, the former being co-written with Greg Kurstin, while the latter being co-written with Jesse Shatkin.

In 2013, Clarkson released her first Christmas album, Wrapped in Red, which to her represented a beginning for a second phase for her career. In the midst of recording it, she also collaborated with recording artists Robbie Williams, Martina McBride and Trisha Yearwood in their respective albums Swings Both Ways (2013), Everlasting (2014) and PrizeFighter: Hit After Hit (2014). In an interview with Billboard magazine, she announced intentions to release a set of pop and country records, as well as a potential Broadway album, as a follow-up to Wrapped in Red. RCA Records chief executive Peter Edge also revealed in their 2014 mid-year assessment that they were in a process of finding new music and directions for some of their established acts – primarily with Clarkson. Early stages of development for a follow-up studio album began as early as June 2012, with Clarkson commissioning Rodney Jerkins in recording a potential track. She remarked: "We're already working. I'm constantly like that because you never know when you're going to find a song and so we're always working on the next thing." The follow-up album would complete the terms of her recording contract with RCA Records and 19 Recordings, which was signed following her win on the first season of the television competition American Idol in 2002.

Recording sessions for Piece by Piece began while Clarkson was in the midst of the 2013 Honda Civic Tour with Maroon 5 and continuing on while being pregnant with her first child. During its production, Clarkson had amassed over twenty songs for her to record. Some of the production team behind Wrapped in Red also returned on Piece by Piece. They were led by Greg Kurstin, whom Clarkson had first commissioned for Stronger. Jesse Shatkin, who had first worked as an engineer under Kurstin on Clarkson's last two studio albums, revealed that he had produced a couple tracks on the record. He described the transition into a more creative role as "especially poignant". Sia, who was also a frequent collaborator of Kurstin and Shatkin, announced intentions to submit recording material to Clarkson. Joseph Trapanese, who conducted arrangements in Wrapped in Red, later confirmed that he had finished arranging and recording five of the album's songs with a full philharmonic orchestra.

== Composition ==
=== Theme and influences ===
Inspired by the production on Wrapped in Red, Clarkson wanted all the tracks on Piece by Piece to sound like its own soundtrack, while also wanting every song to have potential as a single. Taking inspiration from the soundtracks of the feature films Cruel Intentions (1999) and Love Actually (2003), she remarked: "I love soundtracks and I love how you can tell, 'Oh, this should be in a soundtrack!' You can picture the movie. I definitely wanted the orchestral elements going on and I definitely wanted the intense factor going on." Clarkson illustrated the album as a concept record telling a single "awesome" story, using different pieces of her character, leading her to name the album Piece by Piece. Citing the aspects of heartbreak and personal struggle as well as peace and empowerment in its lyrical content, she described the record as an album within an uplifting and reflective environment. She recalled: "I'm 32 years old, I have pretty much run the gauntlet of pretty much every emotion you could possibly go through — especially being 19 [years old] and being thrust into the industry, and growing up really quickly."

=== Music and lyrics ===
"Take You High" (2015)
One of the album's highlights, the splintered EDM sound of "Take You High" features orchestral strings balanced by the digital scribbles to Clarkson's vocals.

Clarkson shares five co-writing credits on Piece by Piece, as she explained her pregnancy prevented her from writing more material. She recalled: "It was the first time I didn't really feel inspired, because I was so sick, but I didn't feel like writing anymore. The big difference for this recording was collecting from other writers I'm inspired by." The album opens with "Heartbeat Song", produced by Greg Kurstin and written by Kara DioGuardi, Jason Evigan, Audra Mae, and Mitch Allan. Clarkson described the track as a song that could have fit on Stronger but was a little more progressive, and said that the track serves as a bridge connecting Stronger to Piece by Piece. Produced by Jesse Shatkin, "Invincible" follows as the second song of empowerment, written by Sia, Shatkin, Steve Mostyn, and Warren "Oak" Felder. Clarkson had originally intended the song to be recorded as a duet with Sia, but RCA ultimately decided to keep Sia's vocals uncredited to avoid competition with her studio album 1000 Forms of Fear (2014), as both were on the same label. The last song recorded for Piece by Piece, Shatkin sent the song to Clarkson, saying: "Sia and I just wrote this song and you've gotta hear it. I know you're finished with the record but you've gotta hear it", to which she quickly agreed. The third track, "Someone", is a non-apology apology song written by Matthew Koma and produced by Kurstin. "Take You High", the fourth track, was written with Mozella and produced by Shatkin, who described it as "an electronic banger" and "a little left-of-center", but also having a haunting melody that he thought Clarkson was attracted to.

Clarkson described the fifth song and title track "Piece by Piece" as her most personal song on the album. It was produced by Kurstin, who co-wrote the song with Clarkson after a conversation she had with her sister about their family life. The sixth song, "Run Run Run", features American recording artist John Legend. Produced by Jason Halbert, it was written by Tim James, Antonina Armato, Joacim Persson, Ry Cuming, and David Jost. Clarkson and Legend had previously worked together on the short-lived American television program Duets in 2012. Originally deeming it to be a solo record, Clarkson invited Legend to turn the track into a duet after recording her part during the 2013 Honda Civic Tour. Legend responded within ten minutes, saying: "Oh my God, I'd love to do it. Send me the file!" "Run Run Run" was also recorded by the German rock band Tokio Hotel for their fifth studio album Kings of Suburbia (2014), which Clarkson was unfamiliar with until releasing her version of the song. Clarkson co-wrote the seventh track "I Had a Dream" with Kurstin (who also produced it) after lamenting with her friends about the dichotomy that exists between expectations and reality and her disappointment in their generation. Clarkson bemoaned: "I don't understand why we're still struggling with these basic, asinine issues [gay, straight, black, and white]. It bothers me. So I ended up writing this whole song about it and I had a dream that we were more." The song features a "gospely chorus."

Kurstin produced the eighth track, "Let Your Tears Fall", which was co-written with Sia. It was the first song Clarkson recorded for Piece by Piece; she had recorded while still touring with Maroon 5. The song was finished just as Sia and Kurstin had completed work for 1000 Forms of Fear. Clarkson fell in love with the song's lyrical message of "having that person in your life—or people in your life—who can be a shoulder to cry on." Co-writing with Clarkson, Kurstin also produced the ninth song, "Tightrope". Originally penned as a simple piano ballad, Clarkson wrote the song about feelings people are unable to prove by themselves in a relationship; Kurstin added an orchestral element with its production. Produced by Halbert, the tenth track, "War Paint", was written by Julia Michaels, Joleen Belle, and Sir Nolan. Clarkson described the song as a record about letting someone's guard down, saying: "We build this wall but at our core we all want the same thing — you want to be loved, and you want to be a part of something." Dan Rockett wrote the eleventh track, "Dance with Me", which was produced by Kurstin. Although it was originally intended to be included on Greatest Hits – Chapter One (2012), Clarkson deemed the song too progressive to be included on it. Rockett also revealed that he imagined the track as a David Bowie/Lady Gaga duet when presenting the song to Polow da Don, who then pitched the song to Clarkson. Written by Justin Tranter, Ryland Blackinton, Dan Keyes, and Vaughn Oliver, the twelfth track, "Nostalgic", was produced by Halbert. Clarkson recorded the song, an uptempo electronic rock song, as an ode to the 1980s. The closing track on the standard edition, "Good Goes the Bye", was written by Shane McAnally and Natalie Hemby. Originally pitched as a country demo, Clarkson remarked that Halbert produced the record to resonate like a Eurythmics-style song. In addition, three tracks were included in the deluxe edition of the album. The fourteenth, "Bad Reputation", written by Clarkson, Kelly Sheehan, Kurstin, and Bonnie McKee, was produced by Kurstin. The fifteenth track, "In the Blue", was produced by Shatkin, who co-wrote it with Clarkson, Anjulie Persaud, and Fransisca Hall. Produced by Chris DeStefano, "Second Wind" closes the album as the final track, which he had co-written with McAnally and Maren Morris.

== Promotion ==
In January 2015 Clarkson shared excerpts of lyrics of nine songs from the album on her website. From February 23, 2015 to February 27, 2015, RCA released "Invincible", "Piece by Piece", "Run Run Run", "Take You High", and "Someone" as promotional singles. Clarkson commented on the campaign: "I can't remember who came up with it, but it's the most genius idea. The album as a whole, it's such a singles world, it's nice to have some way of building anticipation around the full album. It's just nice that they're getting to hear a little bit of the whole record, and then they can make an assessment of the album not based on just one single." From February 26, 2015 to March 2, 2015, RCA, The Hershey Company, and Viacom Media Networks launched a campaign to premiere the tracks "Let Your Tears Fall", "Tightrope", "War Paint", "Dance with Me", and "Good Goes the Bye" on Viacom's music channels MTV, VH1, and CMT.

On the eve of its street date, Piece by Piece was prefaced by an album release party at the iHeartRadio Theater in New York City, a part of which was also simulcasted live on all iHeartRadio adult contemporary and contemporary hit radio stations across the United States. Clarkson also performed "Heartbeat Song" in live televised performances, debuting it on the television program The Graham Norton Show on February 20, 2015, and continuing with the programs Loose Women, The Tonight Show Starring Jimmy Fallon on March 2, 2015, and on Good Morning America on March 3, 2015. During her appearance on Good Morning America, Clarkson announced the first thirty-eight tour dates of her Piece by Piece Tour to support the album, which would begin in Hershey, Pennsylvania on July 11, 2015.

=== Singles ===
"Heartbeat Song", the lead single from Piece by Piece, was released on January 12, 2015. Receiving a positive response in its initial release, music critics described the track as a celebration of Clarkson's return to mainstream pop music. "Heartbeat Song" became a Top 40 hit on the Billboard Hot 100 chart, and attained Top 40 positions in almost every country singles chart it ranked in, including a top 10 position on the Official UK Singles Chart. Clarkson also announced intentions to commission dance remixes for "Take You High" and "Dance with Me". RCA released "Invincible" as the album's second single on May 18, 2015. The title track, "Piece by Piece", was released to adult contemporary radio on November 9, 2015 as the album's third single, which later on debuted in the top 10 of the Billboard Hot 100, becoming the album's highest charting single in the United States.

== Release ==
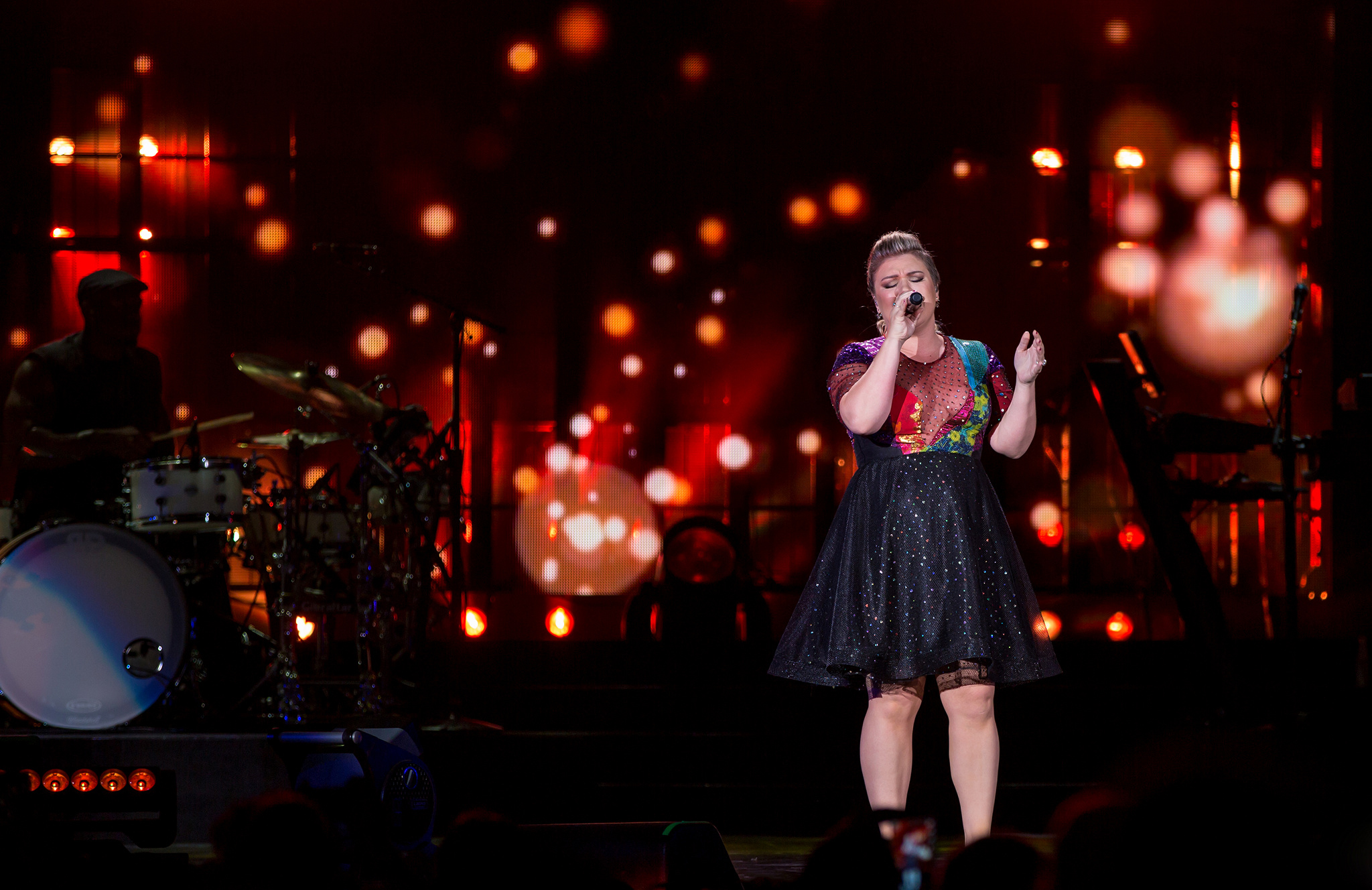
Clarkson performing on the Piece by Piece Tour in Austin, Texas in 2015.

Piece by Piece was first released in Europe and Oceania on February 27, 2015 by RCA Records through its parent company Sony Music Entertainment. On March 3, 2015 it was released in the Americas by RCA and 19 Recordings. That same day, a limited edition box set was released, containing a deluxe edition of the album and a 17-piece lyric card puzzle housed in a customized holographic foil stamped box to correspond to each track. An exclusive pre-sale ticket code for a concert tour supporting the album was also hidden in each box set. A double LP pressing of the record followed the CD release on March 24, 2015. To coincide with the album's first anniversary of release, RCA digitally reissued the deluxe edition of Piece by Piece on March 4, 2016, now containing the "Idol version" of the title track.

== Critical reception ==
Professional ratings
Aggregate scores
Source	Rating
Metacritic	63/100
Review scores
Source	Rating
AllMusic	3/5 stars
Billboard	3.5/5 stars
The Guardian	3/5 stars
Idolator	3.5/5 stars
New York Daily News	2/5 stars
Newsday	B
The Observer	4/5 stars
PopMatters	7/10
Rolling Stone	3/5 stars
Slant Magazine	3/5 stars

Piece by Piece has received a fairly positive response from music critics, who lauded Clarkson's vocal performances, but were also overwhelmed by the album's production and excessive midtempo anthems. At Metacritic, which assigns a normalized rating out of 100 to reviews from mainstream critics, the album received an average score of 63, based on 12 reviews, indicating "generally favorable reviews". AllMusic's senior editor Stephen Thomas Erlewine gave the record a three star rating, writing that "instead of consolidating the assured mature pop of Stronger, the album piles on EDM affectations and finds her singing cuts co-written by successful contemporary pop hit-makers as she enters the second phase of her career." Despite praising her vocal performance as "[powerful] as ever", Erlewine lamented that the record's emphasis on sound (instead of song) tended to submerge Clarkson at times, also noting her receding songwriting presence on the album. Nevertheless, he lauded the tracks "Let Your Tears Fall", "Good Goes the Bye", "Nostalgic", and the title track as giving a right balance of Clarkson's "indomitable character" and the album's fresh electronic beats. Alexa Camp of Slant Magazine also gave it a similar rating, citing that "the welcomed imperfections apparent in Clarkson's voice on Wrapped in Red have sadly been spit-polished away in Piece by Piece." She observed that the tight and shiny execution, as found in "Heartbeat Song", was the album's biggest flaw. In addition, noting its retro cover art and occasional nods to '80s power pop, Camp venerated the tracks "Invincible", saying that "if anyone could do justice to a Sia-penned power ballad, it's the American Idol champ", and "Take You High", which she described as "chopped up to an exhilarating, operatic effect". Idolator's Jonathan Riggs gave it a three-and-a-half star review, stating that overall "Piece by Piece is good, of course – like a familiar suburban chain restaurant, a Clarkson album always delivers comfortably and consistently – but here the more basic cuts pale in comparison to several remarkable tracks that hopefully point to a deepening in her songcraft."

Reviewing for Billboard, Jamieson Cox gave the album a three-and-a-half star review, writing that "Clarkson has largely abandoned the spiky pop rock in favor of fluffy midtempo arrangements and swollen ballads, resulting to some drab moments." Cox added, however, that "when Clarkson forges a real emotional connection – like on the raw, personal title track— the album transcends the hammier, more hackneyed moments in between." The Guardian's Caroline Sullivan gave Piece by Piece a three star rating, praising Clarkson's voice as a reminder that "her amiable, Texas-girl exterior encases one of pop's most forceful voices, despite her Mariah-like ability to deliver songs with maximum melismatic drama shows itself less often this time around." While reviewing The Guardian's sister paper The Observer, features editor Michael Cragg gave the album a four star rating, describing it as "loaded with laser-guided, heartfelt pop music." He also commended the record's "chinks of experimentation; the Phoenix-esque "Nostalgic", the pulsating urgency of "Dance with Me" [...] "Invincible", co-written by Sia, bolts Clarkson's pin-sharp vocal on to a billowing, chest-clenching backdrop, while the title track picks over broken relationships with typical candour." Reviewing for PopMatters, Colin McGuire gave the album a seven out of ten grade, saying that "Piece by Piece showcases a brand new Clarkson all the while staying true to what makes her an artist that continually finds ways to churn out really good pop records." Instilling to remember that Clarkson was now a mother and a wife, McGuire remarked that "she applies a more perspective on life and a knowledge in a way that makes her appear fresh again."

Writing for Time, Katherine St. Asaph praised Clarkson's voice as having "some of the best pipes in pop", but lamented the album's gamut of midtempo arrangements. Praising the tracks "Take You High", "Bad Reputation", and "Run Run Run", she described that "at its best, Piece by Piece sounds like a victory lap from an artist who's earned about five; but at its worst, it evokes the umpteenth hour of an American Idol finale with no victory in sight." Jon Pareles of The New York Times also gave a similar appraisal for Clarkson's voice, saying that "it can sail through just about any arrangement: rock, ballad, arena-country and, most often at the moment, anthems pumped with dance beats." He also observed the album's music as a "huge and glossy, technical tour de force", but woed that "every song aims for the monumental – a strategy that's competitive for radio play but wearying over the course of a whole album." Sarah Rodman of The Boston Globe expressed her agreement with the same sentiment, saying that "the cumulative effect of all that bigness can be wearing by the album's end." She further added that "the swelling strings, shimmering synths, and soaring vocals make almost all of the record's songs sound as if they are on a feverish quest for that grandiose final scene of a romantic drama to score before the credits start rolling." Newsday's Glenn Gamboa gave Piece by Piece a "B" rating, remarking that "Clarkson's successful home life seems to have quenched much of the fire that fueled her previous successes, resulting [in] a much calmer, less excited Clarkson." He also added that "if that's the new plateau she is reaching for, it will be well worth it," saying that "she often comes up a little short on Piece by Piece, offering good, but not great."

Reviewing for Rolling Stone, Chuck Arnold gave Piece by Piece a three star rating, lauding Clarkson's homage to 80s pop music, saying that "when Clarkson hits that money note toward the end, big hair wins again". Giving the album a "C", from The A.V. Club, Annie Zaleski wrote in her review that, for Clarkson, "the album's music doesn't play to her strengths," further adding that "the record could also stand to be a little less conventional, especially since Clarkson is the rare pop star who sounds most comfortable when she's not playing it safe." Praising the songs "Nostalgic" and "Take You High", Zaleski wrote that "Piece By Piece sounds energized during these looser moments", saying "it's hard to shake the feeling the album would've been far better had it taken a few more risks". Jim Farber of the New York Daily News gave the record a two star rating; despite praising Clarkson's voice, he expressed despondency that "the album doubles-down on Stronger's over-heated production," remarking that "Piece By Piece piles on the gloss and glop. It's a fat sounding recording that fights with, rather than enhances, Clarkson's to-the-rafters vocals."

== Commercial performance ==
Prior to its release in the United States, music commercial analysts predicted that the album would likely sell at least 90,000 album equivalent units in its first week of release in the region. Opening with 83,000 copies of traditional album sales, Piece by Piece debuted at the top of the Billboard 200 chart with 97,000 album-equivalent units, which included track equivalent albums and streaming equivalent albums. It was her first Billboard 200 number one album in six years, since All I Ever Wanted (2009), and her third overall. A year after its release, the album rocketed back into the Billboard 200's top 10, blasting from position No. 120 to No. 6 with 44,000 album-equivalent units. That marked the first time the album was in the albums chart's top 10 since its No. 1 debut on the ranking the week ending March 21, 2015. The resurgence resulted from the renewed streams and sales of the album's title track after Clarkson gave a well-received emotional performance of the song on the 15th season of American Idol. The 114-position leap on the Billboard 200 chart was the largest positional jump into the top 10 in five years.

As of September 2017, the album has sold over 284,000 copies in the United States.

Internationally, the album debuted on the top ten of both the Australian ARIA Albums Chart and the Irish IRMA Artist Albums Chart. The album also reached the top twenty of the Dutch Mega Album Top 100 chart as well as on the Official New Zealand Albums Chart. In the United Kingdom, the album debuted on the Official UK Albums Chart at number six with over 14,000 units, making it Clarkson's fifth top ten album and her first there since Stronger (2011).

== Impact ==
Piece by Piece fulfilled the recording contract Clarkson had signed as part of winning American Idol's first season in 2002 with 19 Recordings and RCA Records, making her a free agent and the first American Idol contestant to successfully complete the feat. In a report published by Billboard, it was stated that Clarkson was currently in early stages to directly sign a contract with RCA in contrast to her previous arrangement where 19 Recordings kept phonographic rights licensed to RCA. Despite RCA's advantage, Billboard argued that the Big Machine Label Group could be a serious contender following Clarkson's history with Clive Davis, RCA's former chief executive and Sony's current chief creative officer. Billboard also reported that Piece by Piece's debut at the top of the Billboard 200 earned Clarkson a leverage, with one prominent talent manager saying: "That's a good time to mention you're a free agent, when you have a No. 1 album." Music industry analysts also divulged that compared to her previous contract with a US $500,000 (US $895,005 adjusted for inflation) advance per album, Clarkson could receive up to US$1–3 million advance per album in a new term. However, Clarkson's manager, Narvel Blackstock, asserted that the probability of Clarkson re-signing with RCA was too soon to tell. In an interview with Billboard, RCA executives Peter Edge and Tom Corson stated that Clarkson had entered negotiations for directly signing a multi-album record contract with RCA. However, on June 24, 2016, Clarkson announced she had signed a long-term worldwide deal with Atlantic Records.

== Track listing ==
Piece by Piece – Standard edition
No.	Title	Writer(s)	Producer(s)	Length
1.	"Heartbeat Song"	Kara DioGuardi; Jason Evigan; Audra Mae; Mitch Allan	Greg Kurstin; Jason Halbert^{[a]}	3:18
2.	"Invincible"	Sia Furler; Jesse Shatkin; Stephen Mostyn; Warren "Oak" Felder	Shatkin; Mostyn^{b}; Oak^{b}	3:58
3.	"Someone"	Matthew Koma	Kurstin; Halbert^{[a]}	3:39
4.	"Take You High"	Shatkin; Maureen McDonald	Shatkin	4:20
5.	"Piece by Piece"	Kelly Clarkson; Kurstin	Kurstin	4:17
6.	"Run Run Run" (featuring John Legend)	Tim James; Antonina Armato; Joacim Persson; Ry Cuming; David Jost	Halbert	4:32
7.	"I Had a Dream"	Clarkson; Kurstin	Kurstin	3:58
8.	"Let Your Tears Fall"	Furler; Kurstin	Kurstin	3:55
9.	"Tightrope"	Clarkson; Kurstin	Kurstin	3:32
10.	"War Paint"	Joleen Belle; Julia Michaels; Nolan Lambroza	Halbert	3:44
11.	"Dance with Me"	Dan Rockett	Kurstin	4:20
12.	"Nostalgic"	Justin Tranter; Ryland Blackinton; Dan Keyes; Vaughn Oliver	Halbert	3:37
13.	"Good Goes the Bye"	Shane McAnally; Natalie Hemby; Jimmy Robbins	Halbert; Eric Olson	3:21
Total length:				50:31

Piece by Piece – Google Play reissue (bonus track)
No.	Title	Writer(s)	Remixer	Length
14.	"Piece by Piece" (Radio Mix)	Clarkson; Kurstin	Kurstin	3:44
Total length:				54:15

Piece by Piece – Deluxe edition (bonus tracks)
No.	Title	Writer(s)	Producer(s)	Length
14.	"Bad Reputation"	Clarkson; Kurstin; Kelly Sheehan; Bonnie McKee	Kurstin	3:18
15.	"In the Blue"	Clarkson; Shatkin; Anjulie Persaud; Fransisca Hall	Shatkin	4:41
16.	"Second Wind"	McAnally; Chris DeStefano; Maren Morris	DeStefano; Halbert^{[a]}	3:15
Total length:				61:45

Piece by Piece – Japanese edition (bonus track)
No.	Title	Writer(s)	Remixer	Length
17.	"Heartbeat Song" (Dave Audé Remix)	DioGuardi; Evigan; Mae; Allan	Dave Audé	3:47
Total length:				65:32

Piece by Piece – Deluxe edition reissue (bonus tracks)
No.	Title	Writer(s)	Producer(s)	Length
14.	"Piece by Piece" (Idol version)	Clarkson; Kurstin	Kurstin	3:31
15.	"Second Wind"	McAnally; DeStefano; Morris	DeStefano; Halbert^{[a]}	3:15
16.	"Bad Reputation"	Clarkson; Kurstin; Sheehan; McKee	Kurstin	3:18
17.	"In the Blue"	Clarkson; Shatkin; Persaud; Hall	Shatkin	4:41
Total length:				65:16

Notes

- ^{^[a]} signifies a vocal producer
- ^{^[b]} signifies an additional producer

== Personnel ==
Credits adapted from the album's liner notes.

Vocals

- Kelly Clarkson – all vocals, lead vocals
- Sia Furler – backing vocals
- Nicole Hurst – backing vocals
- John Legend – lead vocals
- Fred Martin and The Levite Camp – backing vocals (7)
- Shane McAnally – additional backing vocals
- Maren Morris – additional backing vocals

Musicians

- Cheche Alara – keyboards
- Chris DeStefano – all instruments, programming, electric guitars, pedal steel guitar, bass, additional backing vocals
- Lester Estelle – drums
- Aben Eubanks – guitars
- Jason Halbert – keyboards, programming, bass
- Oliver Kraus – cello, viola, violin, string arrangements
- Greg Kurstin – keyboards, guitars, bass, drums, BGV arrangements, programming, acoustic piano, chamberlin mellotron
- David Labruyere – bass
- John Lazarus – additional arrangements
- Tony Lucido – bass
- Fred Martin – BGV arrangements
- Jerry McPherson – guitars
- Miles McPherson – drums
- Eric Olson – keyboards, programming, bass
- Rachel Orscher – additional programming
- Tim Pierce – guitars
- The Regiment Horns
  - Leon H. Silva – saxophones
  - Kevin Williams – trombone
  - Sean Erick – trumpet
- Erick Serna – guitars, bass
- Jesse Shatkin – acoustic piano, synthesizers, additional programming, bass, drum programming, percussion, keyboards
- Matt Stanfield – additional programming
- Joseph Trapanese – orchestra arrangements and conductor, additional programming, string arrangements
- Booker White – music preparation
- Justin Womble – additional programming
- Gina Zimmitti – orchestra contractor (6)

Production

- Steph Ashmore – wardrobe stylist
- Narvel Blackstock – manager
- Jeremy Cowart – photography
- Lani Crump – production coordinator
- Ashley Donovan – make-up
- Oak Felder – additional producer
- Meghan Foley – art direction
- Erwin Gorostiza – creative direction
- Jason Halbert – vocal producer
- Steve Mostyn – additional producer
- Keith Naftaly – A&R
- Robert Ramos – hair stylist
- Starstruck Entertainment – management company
- Dave Steunebrink – production coordinator

Technical

- Jason Angel – vocal engineer for John Legend
- Julian Burg – additional engineer
- Shawn Daugherty – assistant engineer, additional engineer
- John DeNosky – additional vocal session engineer, additional engineer
- Chris DeStefano – recording, producer
- Chris Dye – additional vocal session engineer, engineer
- Chris Gehringer – mastering
- Serban Ghenea – mixing
- Ryan Gore – additional engineer
- Jason Halbert – recording, producer
- Greg Kurstin – engineer, producer
- John Hanes – mix engineer
- Jeremy Miller – assistant engineer, additional engineer
- Satoshi Noguchi – engineer, orchestra recording
- Eric Olson – producer
- Alex Pasco – engineer, additional engineer
- Jesse Shatkin – engineer, additional engineer, producer
- Todd Tidwell – additional engineer, assistant engineer, engineer
- Kenta Yonesaka – assistant vocal engineer for John Legend

Studios

- Los Angeles, California (EastWest Studios, Echo Studio, The Rib Cage)
- Nashville, Tennessee (The Attic, The Dressing Room, The Listening Station, Ocean Way Recording, Starstruck Studios, Sub-Level 03 Studios)
- New York City (Germano Studios)
- Mixed at MixStar Studios (Virginia Beach, Virginia).
- Mastered at Sterling Sound (New York City, New York).

== Charts ==
=== Weekly charts ===
Chart (2015–2016)	Peak position
Australian Albums (ARIA)	5
Austrian Albums (Ö3 Austria)	27
Belgian Albums (Ultratop Flanders)	39
Belgian Albums (Ultratop Wallonia)	90
Canadian Albums (Billboard)	4
Dutch Albums (Album Top 100)	18
French Albums (SNEP)	123
German Albums (Offizielle Top 100)	30
Greek Albums (IFPI)	29
Irish Albums (IRMA)	8
Japanese Albums (Oricon)	190
South Korean Albums (Circle)	32
New Zealand Albums (RMNZ)	12
Spanish Albums (Promusicae)	44
Scottish Albums (Official Charts)	5
Swedish Albums (Sverigetopplistan)	22
Swiss Albums (Schweizer Hitparade)	29
UK Albums (Official Charts)	6
US Billboard 200	1

=== Year-end charts ===
Chart (2015)	Peak position
US Billboard 200	105

== Certifications ==
Region	Certification	Certified units/sales
New Zealand (RMNZ)	Gold	7,500^{‡}
Norway (IFPI Norway)	Gold	15,000^{‡}
United Kingdom (BPI)	Silver	60,000^{‡}
United States (RIAA)	Gold	500,000^{‡}
^{‡} Sales+streaming figures based on certification alone.

== Release history ==
List of release dates, showing region, formats, label, editions, catalog number and reference
Region	Date	Format(s)	Label	Edition(s)	Catalog number	Ref
Australia	February 27, 2015	CD; digital download	Sony Music	Deluxe	88875070862	
Europe	February 27, 2015	CD; digital download	Sony Music	Standard	88875070862	
Europe	February 27, 2015	CD; digital download	Sony Music	Deluxe	88875070862	
New Zealand	February 27, 2015	CD; digital download	Sony Music	Deluxe	88875070862	
Asia	March 2, 2015	CD; digital download	Sony Music	Deluxe	88875070862	
Denmark	March 2, 2015	CD; digital download	Sony Music	Deluxe	88875070862	
France	March 2, 2015	CD; digital download	Sony Music	Deluxe	88875070862	
Greece	March 2, 2015	CD; digital download	Sony Music	Deluxe	88875070862	
Hungary	March 2, 2015	CD; digital download	Sony Music	Deluxe	88875070862	
Norway	March 2, 2015	CD; digital download	Sony Music	Deluxe	88875070862	
Spain	March 2, 2015	CD; digital download	Sony Music	Deluxe	88875070862	
United Kingdom	March 2, 2015	CD; digital download	RCA	Deluxe	88875070862	
Ireland	March 2, 2015	CD; digital download	RCA	Deluxe	88875070862	
Canada	March 3, 2015	CD; digital download	Sony Music	Standard	88875070852	
Canada	March 3, 2015	CD; digital download	Sony Music	Deluxe	88875070862	
Italy	March 3, 2015	CD; digital download	Sony Music	Deluxe	88875070862	
Japan	March 3, 2015	CD; digital download	Sony Music Japan	Deluxe	88875070862	
Latin America	March 3, 2015	CD; digital download	Sony Music	Deluxe	88875070862	
Portugal	March 3, 2015	CD; digital download	Sony Music	Deluxe	88875070862	
United States	March 3, 2015	CD; digital download	RCA; 19	Standard	88875070852	
United States	March 3, 2015	CD; digital download	RCA; 19	Deluxe	88875070862	
Worldwide	March 3, 2015	Box set	Sony Music	Limited	888750722225	
Brazil	March 10, 2015	CD	Sony Music	Deluxe	88875070862	
United Kingdom	March 23, 2015	2×LP	RCA	Deluxe	88875070861	
United States	March 24, 2015	2×LP	RCA; 19	Deluxe	88875070861	
Japan	March 25, 2015	CD	Sony Music Japan	Japanese edition	SICP-4400	
Japan	March 31, 2015	2×LP	Sony Music Japan	Deluxe	88875070861	
Japan	March 31, 2015	2×CD Box set	Sony Music Japan	Limited	888750722225	
Europe	April 10, 2015	2×LP	Sony Music	Deluxe	88875070861	
United States	January 22, 2016	Digital download; Music streaming	RCA	Google Play deluxe reissue	—N/a	
Worldwide	March 4, 2016	Digital download; Music streaming	Sony Music	Deluxe reissue	886445785272	

== See also ==
- Greg Kurstin production discography
- List of Billboard 200 number-one albums of 2015
