= Piece by Piece (song) =

2015 single by Kelly Clarkson

Single by Kelly Clarkson

from the album Piece by Piece
- Released: November 9, 2015; February 29, 2016 (Idol version)
- Recorded: 2014
- Studio: Starstruck Studios (Nashville, TN); Echo Studios (Los Angeles, CA)
- Genre: Pop
- Length: 4:18 (album version); 3:44 (radio mix); 3:31 (Idol version)
- Label: RCA
- Songwriters: Kelly Clarkson; Greg Kurstin
- Producer: Greg Kurstin

Kelly Clarkson singles chronology
"Second Hand Heart" (2015)	"Piece by Piece" (2015)	"Softly and Tenderly" (2017)

Alternative cover
- Idol version single cover

Music video
- "Piece by Piece" on YouTube

"Piece by Piece" is a song written by American singer Kelly Clarkson taken from her seventh studio album of the same name (2015). She co-wrote the track with producer Greg Kurstin. A midtempo pop song about restoring someone's faith in love and family relationships, Clarkson promulgated "Piece by Piece" as a sequel to the song "Because of You" (2004) but with a "happy ending". After a discussion with her sister about their family life, she introspectively co-wrote the song in a first-person narrative to her father, whose neglect of his family was used as a juxtaposition to her then-husband Brandon Blackstock's unconditional love for her and their daughter, whom they both promised to never abandon.

"Piece by Piece" was first released as the second promotional single from Piece by Piece by RCA Records on February 24, 2015. Upon its release, the title track received praise from music critics, who commended its lyrical content as one of the album's highlights. Clarkson premiered the song in a live acoustic performance on The Tonight Show Starring Jimmy Fallon and has showcased it on the set list of the Piece by Piece Tour. A re-worked version of the track was released to American hot adult contemporary radio stations on November 9, 2015, as the third and final single from the album. On February 25, 2016, Clarkson performed "Piece by Piece" in a live presentation on the fifteenth season of American Idol. The successful commercial and critical response of her performance on the program led RCA to issue an "Idol version" of the track on February 29, 2016.

The combined versions of "Piece by Piece" allowed the song to debut on the Billboard Hot 100 chart at number eight, becoming Clarkson's eleventh top ten entry and tying itself with "Never Again" (2007) as her highest debut on the chart. The track also attained the top position on three Billboard charts—primarily the Billboard Digital Songs chart, becoming Clarkson's 100th song to reach number one on a Billboard chart—a milestone in her musical career. "Piece by Piece" also peaked within the top 30 of the music charts of Australia, Canada, the United Kingdom and Scotland. Clarkson later performed a reprise of the Idol version on The Ellen DeGeneres Show on March 3, 2016. The Idol version was nominated for Best Pop Solo Performance at the 59th Annual Grammy Awards. Following her 2022 divorce from Blackstock, Clarkson rewrote the lyrics in 2023 for live performances to reflect her new self-worth as a single mother.

== Composition ==
One of the five songs she had written for her seventh studio album, Clarkson co-wrote "Piece by Piece" with frequent collaborator Greg Kurstin, who produced the track. Clarkson has said about writing the song:

A lot of the reasons why I wrote "Piece by Piece" was I guess I didn't realize the gravity of the situation until I had a child of my own, and until I experienced love like I do with Brandon (Blackstock) on the daily basis. I guess you don't realize something is missing until you feel it. I can't imagine walking away from my little girl. I can't imagine not having that love anymore. I didn't know it was missing because I never had it. It was a revelation and that's why I wrote that song. I think a lot of people go through that.

"Piece by Piece" (2015)
Clarkson's relationship with her husband serves as an antithesis to that of her estranged father. The complexities between parental bonds, primarily about fatherhood, are explored throughout the song.

Lyrically, the song is a midtempo pop number about restoring someone's faith in love and family relationships. The song starts with a woman's recollection of her father abandoning his family; by the chorus, she finds a new man in her life, whom she describes as someone who, "piece by piece", had restored her "faith that a man can be kind and a father could stay". Written in a first-person narrative, Clarkson introspectively co-wrote the song to her father, whose abandonment of his family when she was six years old was utilized as a juxtaposition in contrast to her husband's unconditional love to her and their daughter, whom they had both promised in the song to never leave behind.

Clarkson pegged "Piece by Piece" as a follow-up song to her 2004 track "Because of You" and the album's "most personal" record, saying that "once you've worked through that and you find love and the kind of happiness you hoped for but didn't really know was possible. It's a happy song. And it has a happy ending, unlike 'Because of You'". She revealed that she was inspired to write it after a discussion with her sister about their relationships with their respective families. She remarked, "I was talking to my sister on the phone about how sometimes girls with daddy issues don't find men like that!". Clarkson also noted how their husbands were so supportive and loving in stark contrast to the cliché about people with "abandonment issues" dating "losers". She also said that "Piece by Piece" is a positive song, despite its somber resonance, and that she's still grateful to her father for making her want to be much more present in her family. Sonically, Jon Pareles of The New York Times compared it to the anthems recorded by U2. While Marissa Muller of CBS Radio described its sound as having a stadium feel with big drums.

=== Lyrics change ===
In August 2023, at her Las Vegas residency, Clarkson amended the lyrics from "But piece by piece, he collected me up / Off the ground, where you abandoned things, yeah / Piece by piece, he filled the holes that you burned in me / At 6 years old and you know," to "I collected me up" and "I filled the holes,". The previous positive song is now a post-heartbreak empowering song as Clarkson switches from "he" to "I". Also, Clarkson switched the lyrics to the chorus from "He never walks away / He never asks for money / He takes care of me / He loves me." to "I just walk away / when they ask for money / I take care of me / 'cause I love me." This chorus change seems to address the main point of content: money from Clarkson's 2022 divorce settlement from Blackstock. In an interview on The Tonight Show with Jimmy Fallon, Clarkson admitted that she changed the lyrics because she found it difficult to sing the original version live while reliving the heartbreak she endured in the divorce, and added that the "healing" rewrite gave her some clarity and allowed her to evaluate her newfound self-worth and empower her fanbase.

== Release and reception ==
"Piece by Piece" was first issued as the album's second promotional single by RCA Records on February 24, 2015. Clarkson also revealed plans for the song to receive a single release. RCA then commissioned a re-worked version of the track for commercial release, which was serviced to hot adult contemporary radio stations on November 9, 2015 as the third single from the album. Following Clarkson's performance on American Idol, RCA issued an Idol version with Clarkson recording a similar performance in studio accompanied by a piano by Jason Halbert and produced and mixed by Halbert on February 29, 2016.

=== Critical response ===
"Piece by Piece" received acclaim from music critics, who praised it as one of the album's highlights for its lyrical content. Reviewing for Billboard, Jamieson Cox regarded the song as a raw and standout vocal showcase, saying that when Clarkson forges a real emotional connection with the track, it allows the album to transcend hammier and hackneyed moments in between. In his review for The New York Times, Pareles described it as the album's most accusatory song; and noted that despite the lyrical vulnerability, its music rises quickly to bombast, triumphal and glamorous but remote. He also lamented that those moments are far too few in the album. Writing for AXS on its release, Chase Hunt singled out "Piece by Piece" as the one that feels more natural than the rest of the album's tracks. He wrote, "Songs penned by [Clarkson], or any artist writing their own songs, feels different. The track is letting fans into her soul while telling more of her story, past and present."

Katherine St. Asaph of Time also highlighted the song as one of the album's stronger moments, describing it as a dagger to deadbeat dads everywhere that marks her most pointed lyrics since Stronger's "You Love Me" (2011). AllMusic's senior editor Stephen Thomas Erlewine also included it as one of the three tracks (along with "Nostalgic" and "Good Goes the Bye") that strike the correct balance of Clarkson's indomitable character and fresh electronic beats on the album's production. Jim Farber of the New York Daily News highlighted the song as one of the two (along with "Someone") that show Clarkson's flair for the passive aggressive put-down and help focus on her persona. Reviewing the album for The A.V. Club, Annie Zaleski also commended the track as one of those where Clarkson is far more engaging, and commented that the album could use more of that emotional complexity and personal connection.

=== Chart performance ===
"Piece by Piece" made its debut chart appearance on the Billboard Adult Top 40 chart on the chart week ending December 19, 2015. It attained a peak position of number 32 and stayed on the chart for nine weeks. Following Clarkson's performance of the song on American Idol, Nielsen Soundscan announced that digital copies of the song had sold a total of 21,996 copies a few hours prior to the end of the tracking week ending on February 25, 2016, posting a 4777% gain from its previous week and allowing it to debut on the Billboard Digital Songs chart at number 35 and at number 18 on the Billboard Bubbling Under Hot 100 Singles chart in the issue dated the week ending March 12, 2016. The following week, "Piece by Piece" made its debut Billboard Hot 100 chart at number eight, becoming Clarkson's eleventh Hot 100 top ten hit on the chart and tied itself with "Never Again" (2007) as her highest entry position on the chart. It also became her first song to reach the top 10 in since "Stronger (What Doesn't Kill You)" reached number one in 2012. It also ascended to the top position on the Billboard Digital Songs chart and Pop Digital Songs chart with 210,000 digital copies sold and 3.1 million streaming activity, posting an 852% digital surge and 969% streaming gain while also becoming her 100th song to top a Billboard chart. In addition, the song re-entered the Billboard Adult Top 40 chart at number 33 and debuted on the Billboard Adult Contemporary chart at number 23. "Piece by Piece" peaked at number nine on the Adult Pop chart, becoming Clarkson's fifteenth top-10 hit on the chart and set a record for the female artist with the most top-10s on the chart. Internationally, "Piece by Piece" debuted on the Billboard Canadian Hot 100 at number 17, on the Official UK Singles Chart at number 95, with an entry at number 37 on the UK Top Sales Chart, and on the ARIA Singles Chart at number 24. Following a performance of "Piece by Piece" by Rebecca Grace on The X Factor, the song re-entered the Official UK Singles Chart at number 27, attaining a new peak position.

As of September 2017, the song has sold over 813,000 copies in the United States.

== Live performances ==
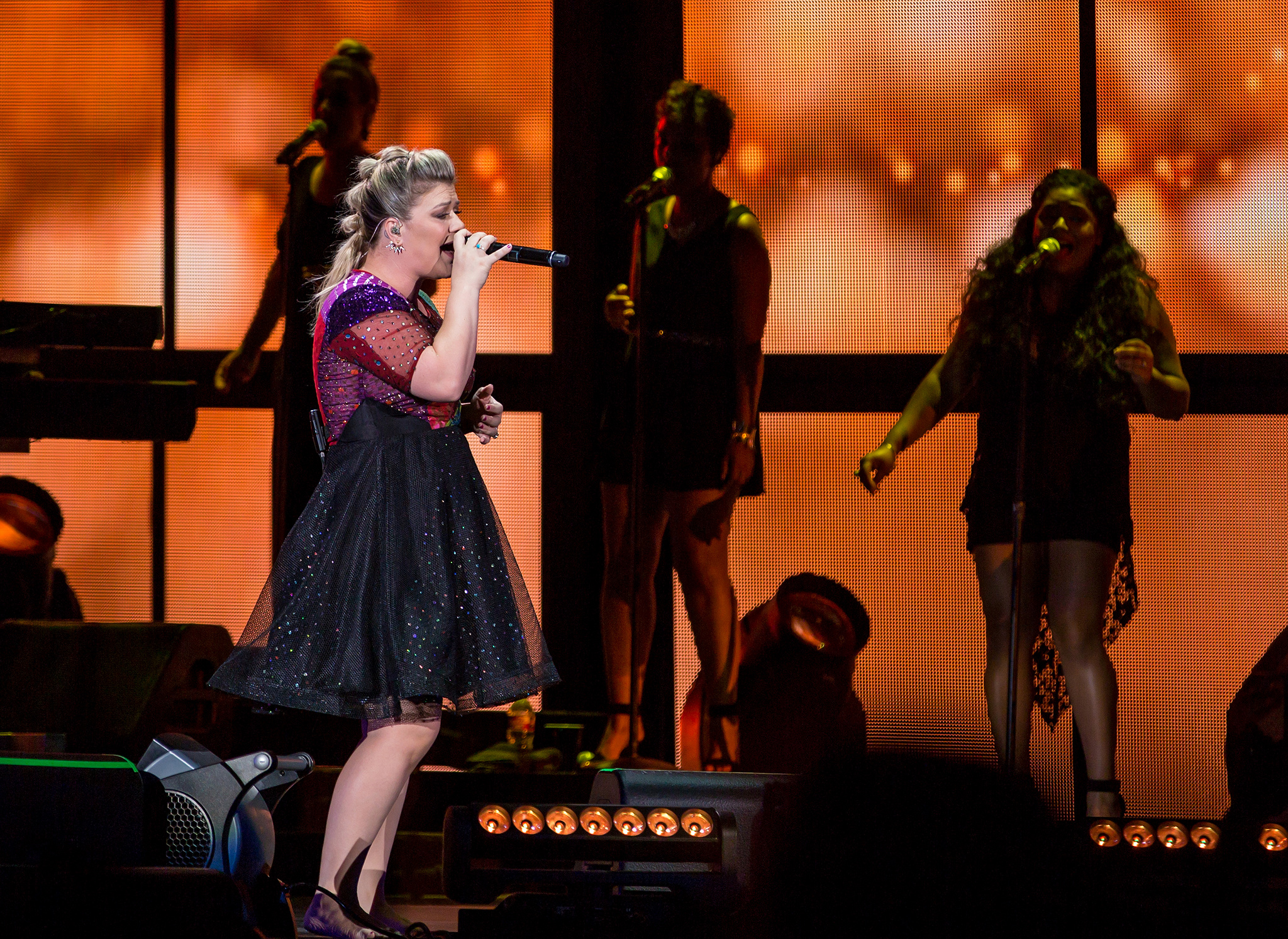
Clarkson performing "Piece by Piece" on the Piece by Piece Tour.

Clarkson presented "Piece by Piece" in a short live acoustic performance on The Tonight Show Starring Jimmy Fallon on March 2, 2015, and explained how she co-wrote the song. She revealed that the song's lyrical content had also made it hard for her to perform it live, saying "It's not even the sad parts of it because I'm not there. I'm not in that place anymore, like where I'm sad about it. I'm in a very forgiving place about it and everybody's human. But I think I get really choked up because I just realize how lucky I am... And a lot of girls that grew up with their daddy issues and with not having that figure in their life, you know, take a very different road, and I just feel lucky that I'm not that girl." To promote the album, Clarkson had also performed the song in a stripped-down performance as part of her set list during her Piece by Piece Tour. On February 25, 2016, she performed "Piece by Piece" in a live performance a year after its release on the fifteenth season of American Idol. Her rendition of the song was met with a standing ovation from the audience and critical acclaim from music critics— with Olivia Waring Metro praising it as poignant while USA Today's Erin Jensen describing it as a "heartfelt performance that we just can't get enough of". On March 3, 2016, Clarkson appeared on The Ellen DeGeneres Show where she discussed her American Idol performance and closed the program with a rendition of the song.

== Music video ==
An accompanying music video filmed by Alon Isocianu (who previously directed her "Invincible" video) was commissioned to promote the single and premiered on Vevo on November 19, 2015. The video, filmed entirely in a monochromatic black-and-white form, features Clarkson singing the song in an empty space, as well as tribute scenes to women of all ages—primarily to mothers, abandoned daughters, and pregnant women, ending with a scene of Clarkson carrying her own daughter.

== Track listing ==
Single – radio mix

No.	Title	Length
1.	"Piece by Piece" (radio mix)	3:44

Single – Idol version

No.	Title	Length
1.	"Piece by Piece" (Idol version)	3:31

== Credits and personnel ==
Credits adapted from the Piece by Piece liner notes and "Piece by Piece" metadata.

Recording

- Engineered at Starstruck Studios, Nashville, Tennessee and Echo Studio, Los Angeles, California

Personnel

- Vocals – Kelly Clarkson
- Engineering – Greg Kurstin, Satoshi Noguchi
  - Additional engineering – Julian Burg, Alex Pasco
  - Assistant engineering – Jeremy Miller, Todd Tidwell
- Bass, drums, guitars, keyboards, production – Greg Kurstin
- Additional programming – Jesse Shatkin
- Orchestra arrangement and conductor – Joseph Trapanese
- Mixing – Serban Ghenea
  - Engineering for mixing – John Hanes
- Music Preparation – Booker White, The Walt Disney Music Library
- Songwriting – Kelly Clarkson, Greg Kurstin

== Charts ==
=== Weekly charts ===
Weekly chart performance for "Piece by Piece"
Chart (2015–2017)	Peak position
Australia (ARIA)	24
Canada Hot 100 (Billboard)	17
Canada AC (Billboard)	6
Canada Hot AC (Billboard)	15
Netherlands (Dutch Top 40 Tipparade) Idol version	16
Scottish Singles Sales (Official Charts)	5
UK Singles (Official Charts)	27
US Billboard Hot 100	8
US Adult Contemporary (Billboard)	11
US Adult Pop Airplay (Billboard)	6

=== Year-end charts ===
2016 year-end chart performance for "Piece by Piece"
Chart (2016)	Position
Iceland (Plötutíóindi)	37
US Adult Contemporary (Billboard)	19
US Adult Pop Songs (Billboard)	33

== Certifications ==
Certifications and sales for "Piece by Piece"
Region	Certification	Certified units/sales
New Zealand (RMNZ)	Platinum	30,000^{‡}
United Kingdom (BPI)	Gold	400,000^{‡}
United States	—	813,000
^{‡} Sales+streaming figures based on certification alone.

== Release history ==
List of release dates, showing region, release format, label catalog number, and reference
Region	Date	Format(s)	Label	Catalog number	Ref
United States	November 9, 2015	Hot adult contemporary radio	RCA	—N/a	
Worldwide	November 19, 2015	Digital download – radio mix	Sony Music	GBCTA1500077	
United Kingdom	February 12, 2016	Digital download	RCA	GBCTA1500005	
United States	February 29, 2016	Mainstream contemporary hit radio – Idol version	RCA	—N/a	
Worldwide	February 29, 2016	Digital download – Idol version	Sony Music	GBCTA1500109	

== See also ==
- List of Billboard Hot 100 top 10 singles of 2016
- List of number-one digital songs of 2016 (U.S.)
