= Take You High =

Promotional single by Kelly Clarkson

from the album Piece by Piece
- Released: February 26, 2015
- Recorded: 2014
- Studio: The Dressing Room (Nashville, TN); The Listening Station (Nashville, TN)
- Genre: EDM; gospel
- Length: 4:20
- Label: RCA
- Songwriters: Jesse Shatkin; Maureen "MoZella" McDonald
- Producer: Jesse Shatkin

"Take You High" is a song by American recording artist Kelly Clarkson from her seventh studio album, Piece by Piece (2015). Written by Jesse Shatkin and MoZella, the song is produced by Shatkin. A midtempo EDM gospel tune, it is a song of encouragement and escapism, in which the singer lends a hand to the despondent. Musically featuring an auto-tuned EDM breakdown, Shatkin described its sound as "an electronic banger" and "a little left-of-center", while Clarkson commented that it reminded her of the music of soundtrack to the 1999 film Cruel Intentions.

"Take You High" was released by RCA Records as the fourth and penultimate promotional single from Piece by Piece on February 26, 2015. Upon its release, it has received a positive response from music critics, some of whom commended the record as one of the album's highlights. Clarkson has included the song in her set list during the Piece by Piece Tour, performing it featuring a portion of the song "When Doves Cry" by Prince.

== Release and composition ==
"Take You High" was first released by RCA Records as the fourth and penultimate promotional single from Piece by Piece on February 26, 2015. Clarkson revealed the reason for its promotional release was for listeners to make a wider option in assessing the album as a whole, not just based on its lead single, "Heartbeat Song".

"Take You High" (2015)
The digitally auto-tuned breakdown of "Take You High" was extolled by critics as one of the album's highlights, and a refreshing departure from Clarkson's previous material.

"Take You High" is a midtempo EDM gospel track produced by Jesse Shatkin, who also co-wrote the song with MoZella. Joseph Trapanese also took part in its arranging and conducting an orchestra during its production. Starting off with a slow melody, it turns into an upbeat chorus, with Clarkson's vocals twiddled with auto-tuned electronic effects accompanied with orchestral strings, synthesizers, and percussion to produce a breakdown. The Dallas Morning News's Hunter Hawk described the breakdown as the song's biggest hook and observed that it does not contain a proper lyrical content, lauding it as sonic surprise on Piece by Piece. However, The National's Rob Garratt discerned it as "at odds" with its chorus. Whereas The A.V. Club's Annie Zaleski pointed out that its digitally scribbled breakdown adds a modern flourish that balances out the song's soaring strings.

According to the sheet music published by Hal Leonard Corporation, "Take You High" is written in the key of A major with a moderate tempo. Lyrically, it is a song of encouragement and escapism, in which the singer lends a hand to the despondent. Shatkin himself described its sound as "an electronic banger" and "a little left-of-center", but also having a haunting melody that he thought Clarkson was attracted to. While Clarkson herself remarked that it reminded her of the soundtrack to the 1999 feature film Cruel Intentions.

== Critical reception ==
Critically, "Take You High" has received a mainly positive response from music pundits, with some of them, such as Slant Magazine's Alexa Camp, The Dallas Morning News's Hauk, and Idolator's Bianca Gracie, pointed out the track as an album's primary standout. In her review for Slant, Camp exemplified the song's music as a refreshingly unexpected moment on the album as well as in Clarkson's whole career in general, lamenting that those moments are far too sparse in it. Reviewing all of the album's tracks for The Dallas Morning News's Guide Live section, Hauk that Clarkson's vocals builds drama throughout its verses and pre-chorus, before surrendering to a swirling blend of chopped up vocal samples. Idolator's Gracie remarked in her review that "Take You High" is not a typical gospel-flecked song, pegging it as unusual for its sonic effects, vocals, synths and percussion. Reviewing for The Observer, Michael Cragg commended Clarkson for experimenting on splintered electronics on "Take You High". While the New York Post's Hardeep Phull complimentary regarded its sound as a "fractured EDM" that brings a contemporary feel to Clarkson's new material without resorting to desperate, Day-Glo antics. In his review of Piece by Piece, PopMatters's Colin McGuire, was ambivalent but fair-spoken for the song, who limned it as a clear play on the current EDM boom that works if one had listened to it enough, despite its first impression's intentions being questionable. Jamieson Cox of Billboard was also lukewarm in his response, describing it as one of the album's drab moments.

== Live performances and potential single release ==
Clarkson has included "Take You High" in her set list for the Piece by Piece Tour to support the album, performing it featuring a portion of the song "When Doves Cry", which was originally sung by Prince. She also revealed in interviews about their plans to commission dance remixes for the song and a possible release as the single from Piece by Piece in the future.

== Credits and personnel ==
Credits adapted from the Piece by Piece liner notes and "Take You High" metadata.

Recording

- Engineered at The Dressing Room, Nashville, Tennessee and The Listening Station, Nashville, Tennessee

Personnel

- All vocals – Kelly Clarkson
- Engineering – Jesse Shatkin
  - Additional engineering – Todd Tidwell
  - Assistant engineering – Shawn Daugherty
- Bass, drum programming, piano, production, percussion, and synths – Jesse Shatkin
- Additional programming – Jesse Shatkin
- Orchestra arrangement and conductor – Joseph Trapanese
- Mastering – Chris Gehringer
- Mixing – Serban Ghenea
  - Engineering for mixing – John Hanes
- Songwriting – Jesse Shatkin, Maureen "MoZella" McDonald
