= Run Run Run (Tokio Hotel song) =

2014 song by Tokio Hotel

Promotional single by Tokio Hotel

from the album Kings of Suburbia
- Released: September 12, 2014
- Recorded: 2014
- Genre: Soft rock
- Length: 3:25
- Label: Polydor; Island
- Songwriters: Joacim Persson; Ry Cuming; David Jost; Bill Kaulitz; Tom Kaulitz; Johan Alkenäs
- Producers: Tom Kaulitz; Bill Kaulitz; Joacim Persson

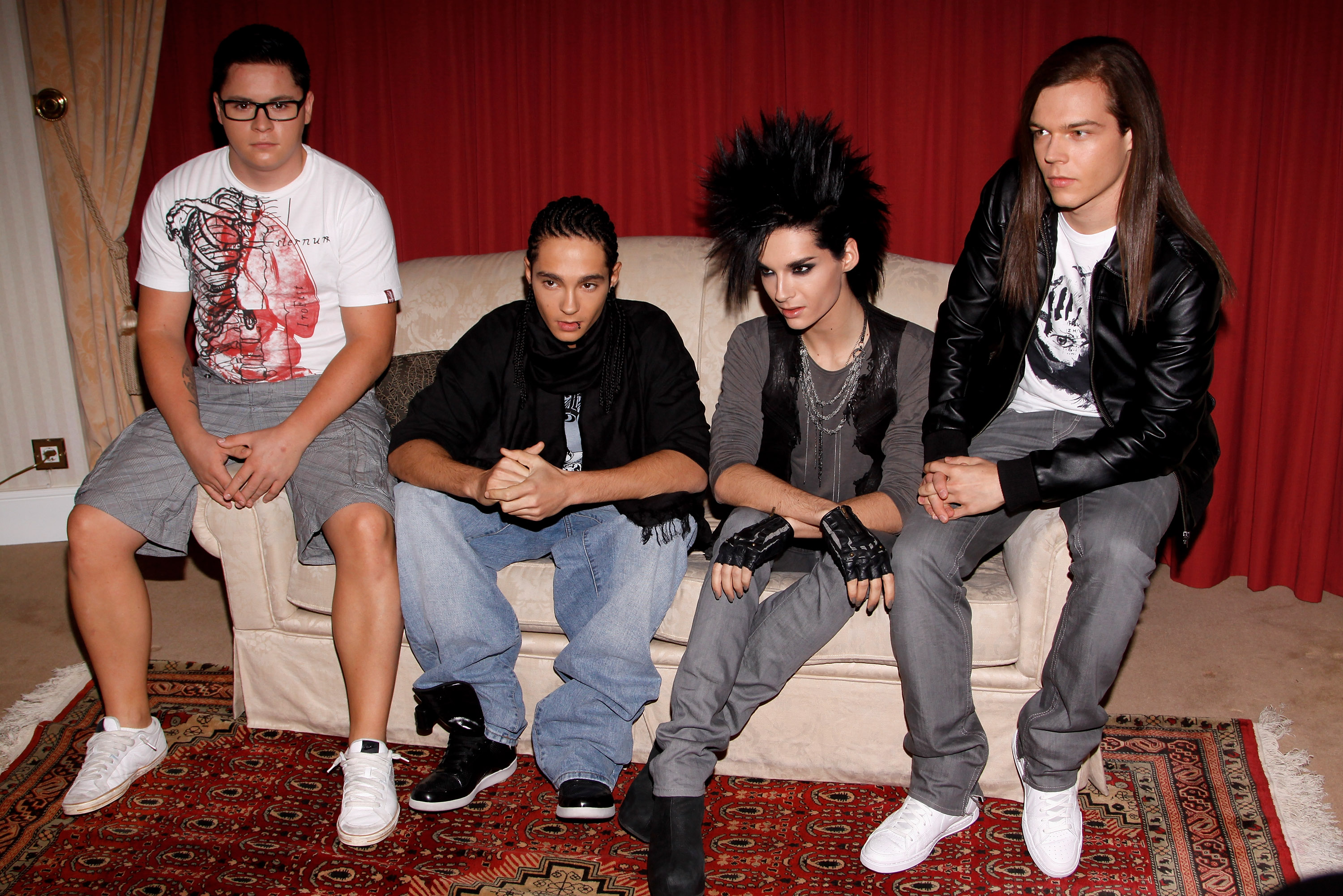
Tokio Hotel in 2015

"Run Run Run" is a song originally written by Joacim Persson, Ry Cuming, and David Jost, recorded by the German rock band Tokio Hotel for their studio album Kings of Suburbia. They released it as the first promotional single from the album on September 12, 2014. It was produced by Tom Kaulitz and Bill Kaulitz, and Persson, with additional writing by Bill Kaulitz, Tom Kaulitz, and Johan Alkenäs.

It was also recorded by American singer Kelly Clarkson featuring John Legend for her album Piece by Piece (2015). It was produced by Jason Halbert with additional writing by Tim James and Antonina Armato of the musical duo Rock Mafia,. It was the third promotional single from the album, released on February 25, 2015.

== Background ==
"Run Run Run" was originally written by Joacim Persson, Ry Cuming, and David Jost. A demo with Jost's vocals was pitched to Kelly Clarkson in 2013, who decided to put the song on hold for recording. During that time, the song was also being recorded by Tokio Hotel. In an interview with the German branch of Interview, Tokio Hotel band member Tom and Bill Kaulitz revealed that they recorded their version themselves, without the aid of any vocal producers. They also remarked that the song presented an uncharted territory for them.

In an interview on Spin, Clarkson revealed that she had found out about Tokio Hotel's version three days after releasing hers. She remarked, "I was just talking to my assistant about it, like, 'Man, I gotta reach out to them about it!' I didn't cover them, because the only time I'd ever heard that song was from my publisher, who sent it to me and said, 'Hey, I have this demo with a piano and a vocal from David Jost,' one of the writers. That's the only way I knew it was the song. I didn't know it was already out there, so that was really fun finding out". She also added, "It's a great song so I could see why another band would wanna sing it. It's so good and intense, but I guess we have the duet version." Clarkson later posted on social networking site Twitter saying that she wasn't given all the information needed and that it looked like she had ripped them off as she would never do that to any artist. While Tokio Hotel offered their salutations and replied that they have received Clarkson's version weeks before it was released as her record label RCA Records had asked them for their publishing information.

== Composition and Chart History ==
Tokio Hotel's version of "Run Run Run" is a soft rock ballad, using a piano played by Bali Harko as its main instrument and Bill Kaulitz as its all vocals. The track, produced by Persson, Bill Kaulitz, and Tom Kaulitz, also received additional writing by Bill Kaulitz, Tom Kaulitz, and Johan Alkenas. Tokio Hotel released "Run Run Run" as the first promotional single from their fifth studio album Kings of Suburbia on September 12, 2014. Filmed by Gianluca Fellini in black-and-white, the song's accompanying music video was also released on the same day, marking their first music video since 2010.

Tokio Hotel's version of "Run Run Run" entered the SNEP Singles Chart at number 80 on the chart week of September 8, 2014.

| Chart (2014) | Peak position |
|---|---|
| France (SNEP) | 80 |

== Kelly Clarkson version ==
"Run Run Run"

Promotional single by Kelly Clarkson featuring John Legend

from the album Piece by Piece
- Released: February 25, 2015
- Recorded: 2013
- Studio: Ocean Way Recording (Nashville, TN); Germano Studios (New York, NY); EastWest Studios (Los Angeles, CA)
- Genre: Soft rock
- Length: 4:32
- Label: RCA
- Songwriters: Tim James; Antonina Armato; Joacim Persson; Ry Cuming; David Jost
- Producer: Jason Halbert

Clarkson's version, also a soft rock piano ballad, features American singer John Legend. The song, produced by Jason Halbert with additional writing by the Rock Mafia duo Tim James and Antonina Armato, was originally envisioned as a solo track. Clarkson reached out with Legend while he was on tour to record it as a duet. She remarked, "He got back to me within ten minutes of sending the email. 'Oh my God, I'd love to do it. Send me the file!' He was on tour so we weren't able to actually be in the studio at the same time, but he's perfect for the song and how I wanted to take it — very dark and very soulful."

Clarkson later released her version featuring Legend as the third promotional single from her seventh studio album Piece by Piece on February 25, 2015. On street date release of Clarkson's version, Tokio Hotel also issued a press release showing their support for the song while coinciding with the announcement of their third extended play Feel It All. Clarkson's version featuring Legend entered the South Korean Gaon International Singles Chart at number 89 on the chart week ending February 28, 2015 and peaked at number 40.

=== Critical reception ===
Clarkson's version received widespread critical acclaim with particular praise on vocals and production. John Walker of MTV stated that "Everyone should wanna collaborate with Kelly Clarkson" and "See what happens when you collaborate with Kelly, everybody?, you and weep with envy." Clarkson was initially criticized for not listing Tokio Hotel as writers for the song, due to Clarkson receiving the song before the latter did, as the original version did not contain the additional lyrics by Tokio Hotel and Clarkson's version received additional lyrics by her own team. Nevertheless, Clarkson responded to the criticism on Twitter, stating "there are now “2 versions of a great song” and went on to say that she meant “no disrespect” for not including them as writers on the song.

=== Charts ===
| Chart (2015) | Peak position |
|---|---|
| Czech Republic Singles Digital (ČNS IFPI) | 75 |
| South Korea International Singles (Gaon) | 40 |
| Slovakia Singles Digital (ČNS IFPI) | 67 |
