= Kristen Barry =

American singer/songwriter

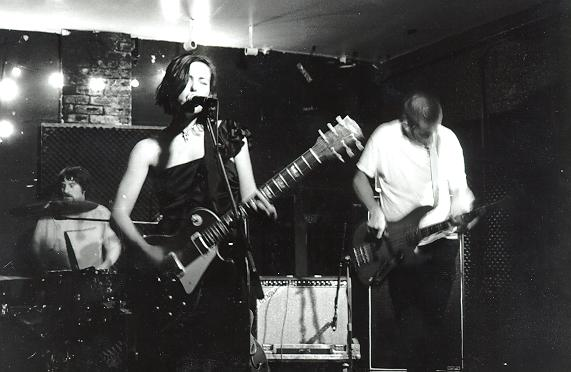

Background information
- Origin: Seattle, Washington, U.S.
- Genres: Alternative rock, grunge
- Years active: 1989–2004
- Labels: Virgin Records
- Past members: Kristen Barry; Chris Ballew; Matt Chamberlain; Rick DeChurch; David Doyle; Brad Caseldan

Kristen Barry (born January 1970) is an American rock musician from Seattle, Washington. Emerging from the 90s Seattle scene, she toured as a solo artist from 1988, released a single solo album in 1996, and worked as a keyboardist and producer for multiple bands. She was dropped by her label in 1999 and left the industry in 2003.

== Career ==
Kristen Barry was born in Seattle, Washington, in January 1970. Her first instrument was a piano given to her at age 5 for Christmas, which started her interest in creating music. She began her career as a member of the band First Thought, joining as their keyboard player in 1985. After 3 years she left the band and started touring solo with her own material, now focusing on the guitar, at age 18. She became a regular at venues such as The Crocodile, RKCNDY, Vogue, and the Central Saloon (known then as the Central Tavern).

In 1991 Jeff Ament of Pearl Jam gave her demo tape to Epic Records, who flew her to LA under an artist development contract, though this was not fruitful and she returned to Seattle. Her second opportunity wouldn't come about until June 1994, with a record deal from Virgin Records, and she relocated to LA in 1995 to record her first (and only) album. "The Beginning. The Middle. The End" was released in 1996 featuring Matt Chamberlain on drums and Chris Ballew on bass, and she embarked on a tour throughout 1996 and 1997 in support of it.

Kristen began writing for her next album while touring, and one song - "Ordinary Life" - was released on the Cruel Intentions (soundtrack). Shortly afterward, she was dropped by her label, and moved to New York. She briefly joined the band Star Ghost Dog as their touring keyboardist in 2001, also performing some solo shows between, before finally leaving the industry completely to go back to school for psychology.

== Discography ==
=== Studio albums ===
| Year | Album details |
|---|---|
| 1996 | The Beginning. The Middle. The End: Released: 1996; Label: Virgin Records; Format: CD, cassette |

=== Other appearances ===
| Year | Song | Title | Label |
|---|---|---|---|
| 1995 | "Joyride" | Home Alive: The Art of Self Defense | Epic |
| 1999 | "Ordinary Life" | Cruel Intentions (soundtrack) | Virgin Records |
