= Glow (Kelly Clarkson and Chris Stapleton song) =

Promotional single by Kelly Clarkson and Chris Stapleton

from the album When Christmas Comes Around...
- Released: October 15, 2021
- Recorded: 2021
- Studio: Glenwood Place Studios (Burbank, CA); The Listening Station (Pasadena, CA); The Vibe Room (Universal City, CA)
- Genre: Christmas; soul; country
- Length: 3:18
- Label: Atlantic
- Songwriters: Kelly Clarkson; Danja; Jason Halbert; Hayley Warner; Jesse Thomas
- Producer: Jason Halbert

"Glow" is a duet by American singer-songwriters Kelly Clarkson and Chris Stapleton from her ninth studio album and second Christmas album, When Christmas Comes Around... (2021). Written by Clarkson, Danja, Jason Halbert, Hayley Warner, and Jesse Thomas, it was released a promotional single by Atlantic Records on October 15, 2021.

== Background and release ==
"Glow" is a soulful country Christmas ballad written by Clarkson, Danja, Jason Halbert, Hayley Warner, and Jesse Thomas. Produced by Halbert, the song is about the one special person who is missing from an otherwise perfect Christmas. Stapleton, who had previously co-wrote a song for Clarkson on the soundtrack to the feature film Trolls World Tour, was invited by Clarkson to record the song with her while recording the album's other tracks with Jesse Shatkin. First released on streaming platforms on October 15, 2021, "Glow" was originally scheduled to be sent to country radio stations as the second single from When Christmas Comes Around... on October 18, 2021, but its release was ultimately canceled.

== Critical reception ==
In his review of the album, Mike Dewald of Riff Magazine wrote that Stapleton's vocal performance perfectly complements Clarkson's. Country Now staff also shared the same sentiment. Michael Major of BroadwayWorld highlighted the track as a "cheerful standout" on the album.

== Charts ==
Chart performance for "Glow"
Chart (2021)	Peak position
US Holiday Digital Song Sales (Billboard)	41

== Release history ==
List of release dates, showing region, release format, catalog, and label
Region	Date	Format	Label	Catalog No.	Ref.
Various	October 15, 2021	Digital download; streaming	Atlantic	USAT22104758	
