= List of Billboard number-one electronic albums of 2016 =

These are the albums that reached number one on the Billboard Dance/Electronic Albums chart in 2016.

== Chart history ==
Key
†	Indicates best-performing album of 2016

Issue date	Album	Artist	Reference
January 2	In Return	Odesza	
January 9	Now That's What I Call a Workout 2016 †	Various artists	
January 16	Skrillex and Diplo Present Jack Ü	Jack Ü	
January 23	Now That's What I Call a Workout 2016 †	Various artists	
January 30	Now That's What I Call a Workout 2016 †	Various artists	
February 6	Now That's What I Call a Workout 2016 †	Various artists	
February 13	In Return	Odesza	
February 20	Now That's What I Call a Workout 2016 †	Various artists	
February 27	Opus	Eric Prydz	
March 5	Now That's What I Call a Workout 2016 †	Various artists	
March 12	Star Wars Headspace	Various artists	
March 19	Now That's What I Call a Workout 2016 †	Various artists	
March 26	Piece by Piece Remixed	Kelly Clarkson	
April 2	After Party	Adore Delano	
April 9	Barbara Barbara, We Face a Shining Future	Underworld	
April 16	Creation	Seven Lions	
April 23	Super	Pet Shop Boys	
April 30	Super	Pet Shop Boys	
May 7	Material	Blaqk Audio	
May 14	Listen	David Guetta	
May 21	The Ship	Brian Eno	
May 28	The Colour in Anything	James Blake	
June 4	Cloud Nine	Kygo	
June 11	Now That's What I Call a Workout 2016 †	Various artists	
June 18	Skin	Flume	
June 25	Now That's What I Call a Workout 2016 †	Various artists	
July 2	Now That's What I Call a Workout 2016 †	Various artists	
July 9	Unlimited	Bassnectar	
July 16	The Mountain Will Fall	DJ Shadow	
July 23	Now That's What I Call a Workout 2016 †	Various artists	
July 30	Cheetah	Aphex Twin	
August 6	32 Levels	Clams Casino	
August 13	Mushroom Jazz: Volume 8	Mark Farina	
August 20	Generationwhy	Zhu	
August 27	Encore	DJ Snake	
September 3	Encore	DJ Snake	
September 10	Brave Enough	Lindsey Stirling	
September 17	Brave Enough	Lindsey Stirling	
September 24	Brave Enough	Lindsey Stirling	
October 1	AIM	M.I.A.	
October 8	Mount Ninji and da Nice Time Kid	Die Antwoord	
October 15	Brave Enough	Lindsey Stirling	
October 22	Epoch	Tycho	
October 29	Brave Enough	Lindsey Stirling	
November 5	The Pale	William Control	
November 12	Now That's What I Call a Workout 2016 †	Various artists	
November 19	Two Vines	Empire of the Sun	
November 26	Collage	The Chainsmokers	
December 3	The Fall of a Rebel Angel	Enigma	
December 10	Woman	Justice	
December 17	Collage	The Chainsmokers	
December 24	W:/2016Album/	Deadmau5	
December 31	Brave Enough	Lindsey Stirling	
