= Good Goes the Bye =

Song by Kelly Clarkson

from the album Piece by Piece
- Recorded: 2014
- Studio: The Listening Station, Nashville
- Genre: Synthpop
- Length: 3:21
- Label: RCA
- Songwriters: Shane McAnally; Natalie Hemby; Jimmy Robbins
- Producers: Jason Halbert; Eric Olson

"Good Goes the Bye" is a song by American singer Kelly Clarkson from her seventh studio album, Piece by Piece (2015). Produced by Jason Halbert and Eric Olson, the song closes the standard edition of the album and was written by country music songwriters Shane McAnally, Natalie Hemby, and Jimmy Robbins. Originally penned as a country song, Clarkson, Halbert, and Olson revamped it into a synthpop record, inspired by the 1980s pop music the British musical duo Eurythmics. A beat-driven track, the song is about ending a failing relationship. "Good Goes the Bye" received its premiere on Viacom Media Networks's three channels, MTV, VH1, and CMT on March 2, 2015, the day before the album's release.

Lauded for its lovelorn closing of the album, "Good Goes the Bye" has received a positive reception from music critics. Following the release of Piece by Piece, it debuted on the South Korean Gaon Download Chart and The Official Finnish Airplay Chart as an album cut.

== Background and composition ==
"Good Goes the Bye" (2015)
Jason Halbert produced "Good Goes the Bye" to resemble the sound popularized by the Eurythmics (pictured below).

"The original song demo was actually more country. I worked with Jason Halbert we made it more old school, like Eurythmics-style production which makes it the perfect 80's-style pop song. I just love the message, the cleverness and great song writing."

— Clarkson on revamping the song's original country demo into a pop track

"Good Goes the Bye" was written by Shane McAnally, Natalie Hemby, and Jimmy Robbins. McAnnally had previously worked with Kelly Clarkson on the tracks "Tie It Up" (2013) "Wrapped in Red" (2013) while Hemby had previously collaborated with Clarkson on "Don't Rush" (2012). In 2014, McAnally and Hemby had sent a country demo of the song featuring Hemby's vocals to Clarkson while working on a country recording project with her. Upon hearing it, Clarkson and her producer Jason Halbert felt that the demo could be transformed into a pop track featuring a 1980s Eurythmics beat and decided to include it as the closing record on her seventh studio album, Piece by Piece (2015). She remarked, "The great thing about people like Shane and Natalie is that they just write classic melodies and clever lyrics. So it really can float through any genre." Further adding that they chose the song based on wherever it will shine the brightest, she remarked, ""Good Goes the Bye" was a good country song, but it's a great pop song."

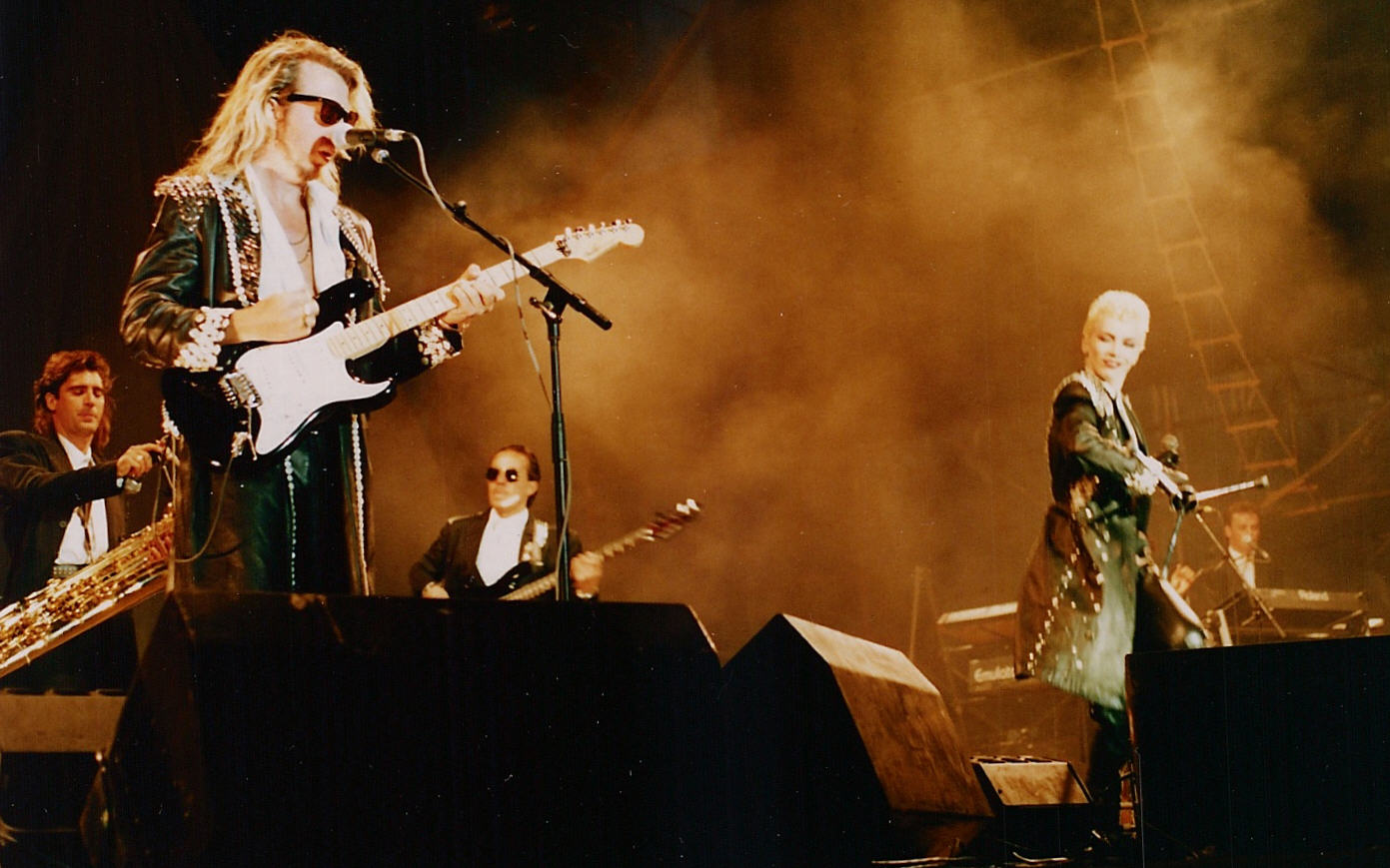
"Good Goes the Bye"'s recording was inspired by the Eurythmics (pictured).

"Good Goes the Bye" is a '80s-inspired mid-tempo synthpop track. Sonically inspired by music of the British musical duo Eurythmics, Clarkson revealed that the song's driving source is very much its beats. Written in the key of Db major, the song is about the end of a failing relationship, utilizing the adage "Rome wasn't built in a day" and a simile of pulling the fuse out of grenades in its lyrical content, while its chorus features the idioms such as slam the door and "break the heart" in its structure. On March 2, 2015, the day before Piece by Piece's street date, RCA Records, The Hershey Company and Viacom Media Networks premiered the track on three of Viacom's music channels: MTV, VH1, and CMT.

== Critical reception and chart performance ==
"Good Goes the Bye" has received a positive response from music critics. Reviewing Piece by Piece for AllMusic, senior editor Stephen Thomas Erlewine remarked that the song floats upon its percolating beats and included it as one of the three tracks that strike a right balance of Clarkson's indomitable character on the album's fresh electronic beats. Idolator's Jonathan Riggs highlighted it as "Best Song That Wasn't the Single" on the album, describing it as utterly gorgeous and a quintessential Kelly Clarkson, further adding that "somehow she manages to simultaneously project sadness, bravery, wisdom, and healing". Jason Scott of Popdust.com commended the track as an alt-pop explosion that closes the album. In his review for The Dallas Morning News's Guide Live section, music critic Hunter Hauk wrote that the song takes the album out in a fine lovesick fashion, but was ambivalent on the "hush goes the phone" lyric in the chorus. Four months following the release of Piece by Piece, made its debut chart appearance on The Official Finnish Airplay Chart at number 92 on the chart week ending July 7, 2015.

== Credits and personnel ==
Credits adapted from the Piece by Piece liner notes and "Good Goes the Bye" metadata.

Recording

- Engineered at The Listening Station, Nashville, Tennessee

Personnel

- All vocals – Kelly Clarkson
- Engineering – Christopher Dye
  - Additional engineering – John Denosky, Robert Venable
- Bass – Tony Lucido
- Keyboards, production, and programming – Greg Kurstin
- Guitars – Jerry McPherson
- Mastering – Chris Gehringer
- Production coordination – Lani Crump, Dave Steunebrink
- Mixing – Serban Ghenea
  - Engineering for mixing – John Hanes
- Songwriting – Shane McAnally, Natalie Hemby, Jimmy Robbins

== Charts ==
| Chart (2015) | Peak position |
|---|---|
| Finland Airplay (Radiosoittolista) | 92 |
| South Korea International Downloads (Gaon) | 72 |
