= Dance with Me (Kelly Clarkson song) =

Song by Kelly Clarkson

from the album Piece by Piece
- Recorded: 2013
- Studio: Echo Studio (Los Angeles, CA); Starstruck Studios (Nashville, TN)
- Genre: Synthpop; dance-pop
- Length: 4:20
- Label: RCA
- Songwriter(s): Dan Rockett
- Producer(s): Greg Kurstin

"Dance with Me" is a song by American recording artist Kelly Clarkson from her seventh studio album, Piece by Piece (2015). Produced by Greg Kurstin, it was the first song written by Dan Rockett after collaborating with Polow da Don in his tenure as a studio runner and an audio engineer at Interscope Records. Originally penned as a David Bowie and Lady Gaga duet, the track was later sent to Clarkson who was recording songs for her first greatest hits album Greatest Hits – Chapter One (2012) at the time. Instead of being included for Chapter One, she later recorded the song for Piece by Piece. An '80s U2-inspired energetic synthpop and dance-pop anthem, "Dance with Me" is a song about dancing and escapism, serving as an invitation and to dance with one another.

"Dance with Me" has received a generally positive response from music critics, who lauded Clarkson's vocal performance and the complimented the song as an energetic tune. Upon Piece by Piece's release, it charted within the top 40 of the South Korean Gaon International Digital Chart as an album cut. "Dance with Me" was also included by Clarkson as the opening number in her Piece by Piece Tour.

== Overview ==
"Dance with Me" was written Dan Rockett in 2011. After working at Interscope Records as a studio runner and an audio engineer, Rockett was commissioned to perform as a last-minute session musician with producer Polow da Don, who was recording the song "Timothy Where You Been" for Timbaland at the time. After collaborating with Polow da Don, he decided to write and produce pop-oriented songs. Originally penned as an songwriting excessive, Rockett ended up writing "Dance with Me", which he had imagined as a duet between David Bowie and Lady Gaga. He later presented the number to Polow da Don, who remarked, "You wrote a classic people will sing in 50 years." Impressed with the song's outcome, Polow da Don commissioned other tracks from Rockett, which includes Lloyd's "Angel" (2011).

Kelly Clarkson, who was in the midst of recording tracks for her first greatest hits album, Greatest Hits – Chapter One, received a demo of the song in 2012. One of the six songs originally intended for Chapter One, Clarkson ultimately decided to hold the track over for a follow-up project, deeming it as being too progressive to be included in a compilation set. She later recorded the track with her longtime collaborator Greg Kurstin for her seventh studio album, Piece by Piece. "Dance with Me" is a '80s U2-inspired energetic synthpop and dance-pop anthem about dancing and escapism. Built on stomping four-on-the-floor beat and The Edge-like guitar stabs, its lyrics mainly present an invitation and a call to action to dance with one another and be carefree throughout the night. Clarkson, who uses music as a form of emotional expressions, fell in love with the song and remarked, "At the end of the day, everyone dancing in that club has their own life going on and their own ups and downs. But it doesn't matter at that point, because you're just having a good time and releasing."

== Release and reception ==
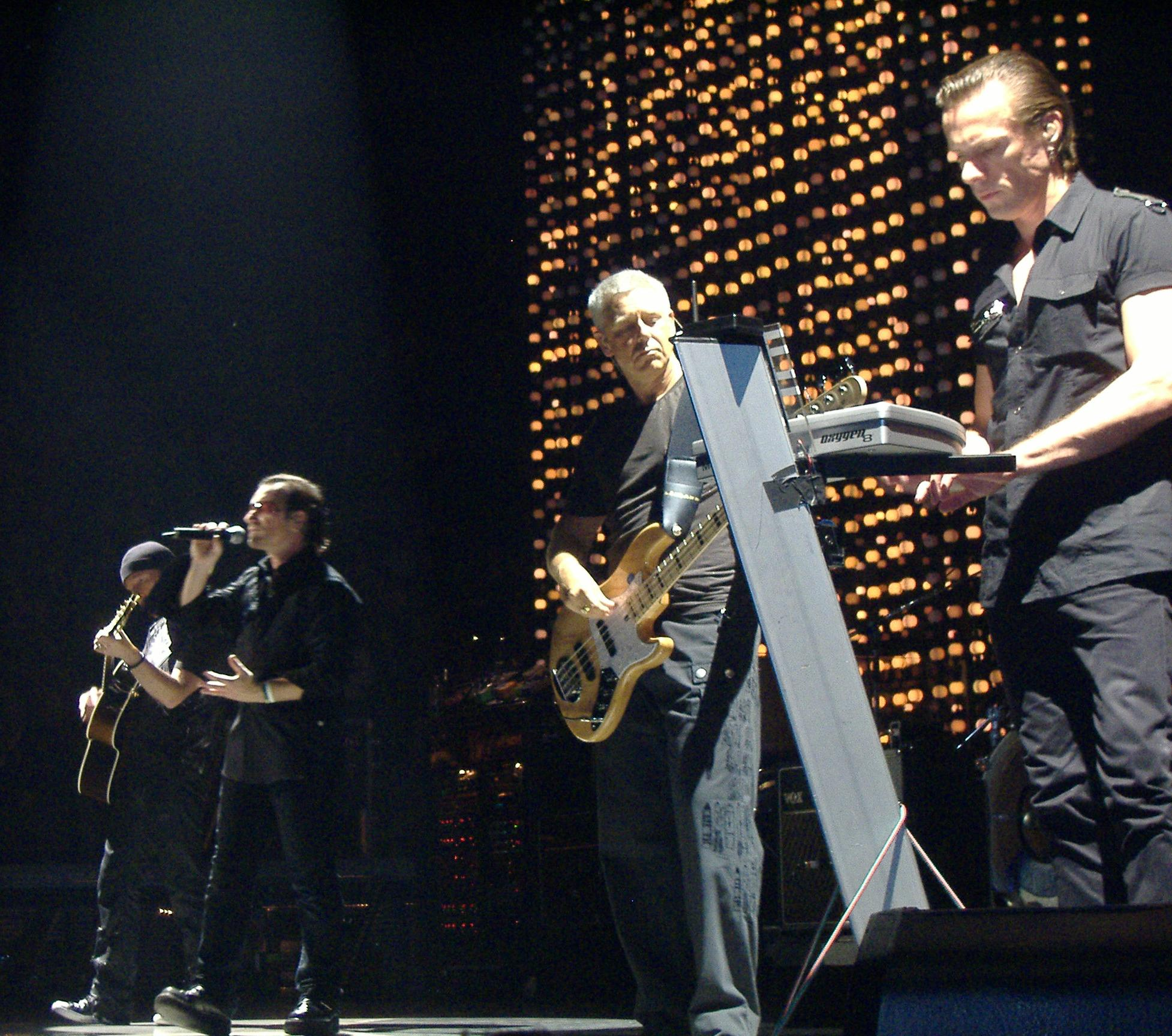
Critics compared "Dance with Me"'s anthemic sound to the musical works of the Irish band U2.

"Dance with Me" received its premiere by RCA Records on three of Viacom Media Networks' channels MTV, VH1, and CMT on March 1, 2015, in a promotional campaign for Piece by Piece sponsored by The Hershey Company. Clarkson has also announced plans to commission dance remixes for the song in the future.

=== Critical response ===
In his review of Piece by Piece, Chuck Arnold of Rolling Stone compared Clarkson's performance as similar to Pat Benatar over the thump of U2's "Where the Streets Have No Name". Reviewing the album for The Observer', Michael Cragg commended the number's pulsating energy. Whereas Idolator's Bianca Gracie praised Clarkson's soaring vocals and Kurstin's fuzzy guitar flicks that have given an edge to the energetic pop tune. While in The Dallas Morning News's Guide Live section, music critic Hunter Hauk wrote that "Dance with Me"'s carefree lyrics fall right in line with its dance-pop sound. However, criticism came from The A.V. Club's Annie Zaleski, who lamented that instead of being a rainbow-and-glitter blast of carefree rabble-rousing, the song ended up as a half-hearted, tired-sounding plea to get moving.

=== Chart performance, live performances and usage in media ===
Upon the release of Piece by Piece, "Dance with Me" entered the South Korean Gaon International Digital Chart at number 24, and stayed on the chart for two weeks as an album cut. Clarkson also performed "Dance with Me" live as her opening number in her Piece by Piece Tour in 2015. In the 20th season of the American competition series Dancing with the Stars, contestants Noah Galloway, Sharna Burgess, Robert Herjavec, and Kym Johnson performed a Cha-cha-cha dance-off to the song, where the former two emerged as the round's victors and latter two being eliminated from the program.

== Credits and personnel ==
Credits adapted from the Piece by Piece liner notes and "Dance with Me" metadata.

Recording

- Engineered at Echo Studio (Los Angeles, California) and Starstruck Studios (Nashville, Tennessee)

Personnel

- Kelly Clarkson – lead vocals
- Nicole Hurst – background vocals
- Greg Kurstin – engineering, bass, guitars, keyboards, production, programming
- Jesse Shatkin – engineering
- Alex Pasco – additional engineering
- Todd Tidwell – assistant engineering
- Chris Gehringer – mastering
- Serban Ghenea – mixing
- John Hanes – mixing engineer
- Dan Rockett – songwriting

== Charts ==
Chart (2015)	Peak position
South Korea International Singles (Gaon)	24
