= Invincible (Kelly Clarkson song) =

Single by Kelly Clarkson

from the album Piece by Piece
- Released: May 18, 2015
- Recorded: 2014
- Studio: The Rib Cage (Los Angeles, CA); Starstruck Studios (Nashville, TN)
- Genre: Pop
- Length: 3:58; 3:44 (radio edit)
- Label: RCA
- Songwriter(s): Sia Furler; Jesse Shatkin; Stephen Mostyn; Warren "Oak" Felder
- Producer(s): Jesse Shatkin; Steve Mostyn; Oak

Kelly Clarkson singles chronology
"Heartbeat Song" (2015)	"Invincible" (2015)	"Second Hand Heart" (2015)

Music video
- "Invincible" on YouTube

"Invincible" is a song by American singer Kelly Clarkson from her seventh studio album, Piece by Piece (2015). It was written by Sia, Jesse Shatkin, Steve Mostyn, and Warren "Oak" Felder. Produced by Shatkin, the track is an anthem about self-empowerment. "Invincible" features uncredited vocals from Sia, as well as string arrangements by Oliver Kraus. It was first released as the first promotional single from Piece by Piece on February 23, 2015, but then issued as the album's second single to Hot Adult Contemporary radio stations on May 18, 2015 through RCA Records.

== Background and recording ==
I've never gotten to sing her songs before. She writes such range-y songs. We work with the same producers. So we kind of have the same mutual friends.

—Clarkson on collaborating with Sia with her producers Greg Kurstin and Jesse Shatkin.

During her Stronger Tour in 2012, Clarkson performed a cover version of Sia's single "Breathe Me" (2004). Upon learning of the performance, Sia offered her salutations and revealed that she had been trying to write a song for Clarkson and will continue to submit material. In 2014, Sia revealed that she wrote a song entitled "Invincible" with Jesse Shatkin. And while demonstrating her work with producer Greg Kurstin on NPR, she ended up writing a part of what would be included in the song, which she remarked that no one had cut yet. She, together with Shatkin, who had also previously collaborated with Clarkson as Kurstin's engineer, finished the song towards the end of Clarkson's recording sessions for her seventh studio album, Piece by Piece. Shatkin presented the song to Clarkson, saying "I know you're done recording your album, but we've just wrote this amazing song and we think you could do great on it." Upon hearing their demo, Clarkson decided to record the song, she replied "I think I could too — I want it!".

== Composition ==
"Invincible" was written by Sia, Shatkin, Steve Mostyn, and Warren Felder. It was one of the two songs Sia had written for Clarkson, the other being "Let Your Tears Fall". The last song recorded for Piece by Piece, it is a midtempo anthem produced by Kurstin together with Shatkin. The song features background vocals by Sia. Lyrically, it sings of empowerment, telling a story of a little girl becoming a woman with unlimited strength, coming into her own and discovering a sense of self-worth. Billboard associate editor Jason Lipshutz remarked that Clarkson has struck this pose many times, further describing the record as less of a fist-pumping anthem than "Stronger (What Doesn't Kill You)" (2012) or "Breakaway" (2004). "Invincible" also features strings arranged and conducted by Oliver Kraus, which music critics also construed that it ratcheted up the intensity of the chorus as well as Clarkson's vocals.

== Release and reception ==
Clarkson shared the lyrics of the chorus of "Invincible" on her website before Piece by Piece was released. "Invincible" was first released by RCA Records on February 23, 2015 as the first promotional single from Piece by Piece. Clarkson had also announced plans to release it as the album's second single after "Heartbeat Song".

=== Critical response ===
"Invincible" received positive reviews from music critics. 4Music commended the song as an "empowering belter", while Nolan Feeney of Time praised the record, saying that of all the artists Sia has collaborated with, few are more suited to the spotlight-averse songwriter's brand of "victim to victory" anthems than Clarkson. In her review for HitFix, Courtney E. Smith described the song as having the looks to combine that Clarkson backbone everyone so loved from tracks like "Since U Been Gone" (2004) and the aural architecture of David Guetta and Sia's "Titanium" (2011). Reviewing for Entertainment Weekly, Taylor Weatherby complimented the track, writing that "Invincible" is more focused on reminding fans of the powerhouse vocalist Clarkson is, and that she that her "Stronger" spirit hasn't changed. In his review for Spin, James Grebey described the song as combining Clarkson's commanding vocals and Sia's songwriting prowess to great effect, and like "Heartbeat Song" before it, the track is an earnest and empowering tour de force with a truly anthemic chorus. Reviewing for Idolator, Bradley Stern doubled that remark, saying that the song is as one might expect a pairing between the quirky singer-songwriter and the masterclass belter to be — emotionally earnest and vocally explosive.

=== Chart performance ===
Upon its release as a promotional single, "Invincible" debuted on the Billboard Pop Digital Songs chart at number 50 on the chart week ending March 14, 2015. Following its official single release, "Invincible" debuted at number 39 on the Billboard Adult Pop Songs chart for the week ending April 6, 2015. It also debuted at number 26 on the Billboard Adult Contemporary chart for the week ending July 4, 2015.

== Music video ==
The music video was directed by Alon Isocianu and was shot in Los Angeles from April 30, to May 1, 2015. Addy Chan choreographed the video. On May 15, 2015, the lyric video for the song was released. The music video was released on May 29, 2015. Clarkson spends most of the video dancing around a warehouse full of cube-shaped floating lamps, which eventually shatter to reveal women who were previously hiding inside. At first, they wear their pain on their faces, but that pain eventually gives way to happiness.

== Live performances ==
Clarkson debuted "Invincible" in a live performance on the 2015 Billboard Music Awards at the MGM Grand Garden Arena on May 17, 2015, a day before its street date. She performed the song with The Voice eighth season runner-up Meghan Linsey during the season finale on May 19, 2015 and on the June 3 episode of The Ellen DeGeneres Show. Clarkson performed the song at the iHeart Radio Summer Pool Party at the Caesar Palace on May 30, 2015. Additionally, Clarkson debuted the song on the British television program, This Morning on June 5, 2015. In July 2015, Clarkson performed the song on Macy's 4th of July Spectacular on NBC.

== Track listing ==
Digital download – Remixes EP
No.	Title	Length
1.	"Invincible" (Vicetone Remix)	3:24
2.	"Invincible" (tyDi Remix)	4:32
3.	"Invincible" (tyDi Radio Mix)	3:40
4.	"Invincible" (Tom Swoon Remix)	4:56
5.	"Invincible" (Tom Swoon Radio Mix)	3:37
6.	"Invincible" (7th Heaven Remix)	6:45
7.	"Invincible" (7th Heaven Radio Mix)	4:36

== Charts ==
=== Weekly charts ===
Chart (2015)	Peak position
Canada AC (Billboard)	14
Canada Hot AC (Billboard)	31
Scotland (OCC)	61
UK Singles (Official Charts Company)	141
US Adult Contemporary (Billboard)	19
US Adult Pop Airplay (Billboard)	11
US Dance Club Songs (Billboard)	2

=== Year-end charts ===
Chart (2015)	Position
US Adult Contemporary (Billboard)	49
US Dance Club Songs (Billboard)	41

== Release history ==
List of release dates, showing region, release format, label catalog number, and reference
Region	Date	Format(s)	Label	Catalog number	Ref
United States	May 18, 2015	Hot adult contemporary radio	RCA	—	
United States	June 9, 2015	Contemporary hit radio	RCA	—	
Worldwide	June 23, 2015	Digital download – Remixes EP	Sony	TBA	
