= Someone (Kelly Clarkson song) =

Promotional single by Kelly Clarkson

from the album Piece by Piece
- Released: February 27, 2015
- Recorded: 2014
- Studio: Starstruck Studios (Nashville, TN); Echo Studio (Los Angeles, CA)
- Genre: Trance
- Length: 3:40
- Label: RCA
- Songwriter: Matthew Koma
- Producer: Greg Kurstin

"Someone" is a song by American pop singer Kelly Clarkson from her seventh studio album, Piece by Piece (2015). The song was written by Matthew Koma and produced by Greg Kurstin. It is a pulsatic trance track, about a defunct relationship, in which a singer sings of a false apology to a former lover while also wishing him to find someone to love in the future. "Someone" was released by RCA Records as the fifth and final promotional single from Piece by Piece on February 27, 2015. The song received mainly positive views from music critics.

== Background and composition ==
"Someone" (2015)
Matthew Koma originally wrote "Someone" for his debut album Arcadia. But upon hearing Clarkson's vocals, he decided to give the song to her. He revealed, "She sings the hell out of it and she owns it and I want her to have that."

"Someone" is written by Matthew Koma and produced by Greg Kurstin. Koma wrote the song while he was still finishing recording with his debut studio album, Arcadia. Lyrically, it is a trance ballad of ambivalence following a breakup in a relationship, in which the singer derides her lover by singing a false apology for saying "shitty" things to him while also hoping for him to find someone to love in life. New York Daily News chief music critic Jim Farber remarked that the song is a classic non-apology apology ballad, saying that she wishes she didn't have to say such awful things to a foe. Containing a censored profane word, the song made Piece by Piece her first studio album to be censored by the Australian Recording Industry Association.

== Release and critical reception ==
Prior to the release of Piece by Piece, Clarkson shared the lyrics of the chorus of "Someone" on her website. "Someone" was first released by RCA Records on February 23, 2015 as the fifth and final promotional single from Piece by Piece. Upon its release, the track debuted at the top ten of the American iTunes Store for the week ending February 28, 2015. A Frank Pole remix of the song was included on Clarkson's first remix album, Piece by Piece Remixed (2016).

"Someone" received positive reviews by music critics upon its release. The Guardian's Carolline Sullivan praised the song as one of Clarkson's greatest kiss-off ballads, writing that she sings the track with the "utmost purity of tone". Reviewing Piece by Piece for New York Daily News, Farber lauded the song as one of the album's most interesting tracks, saying that it repeats Clarkson's flair for the passive aggressive put-down. Jonathan Riggs of Idolator praised "Someone" as having some of the "best, most striking lyrics in recent memory", remarking that it elegantly traces how breakups bring out our kindest and meanest selves. Colin McGuirre of PopMatters shared a similar response, describing it as serving the best illustration of "that Clarksonian candor we've grown to love." Glenn Gamboa of Newsday also praised the song for being "[t]he closest we get to any of Clarkson's previously brassy attitude, calling it a "gorgeous" and "lush synth ballad [...] that caps the tale of an imploding relationship with the tag line, 'I'm sorry I'm not sorry'." Kyle Downling of Music Times praised the track for having "great lyrics, a lot of heart and a very interesting story."

== Credits and personnel ==
Credits adapted from the Piece by Piece liner notes and "Someone" metadata.

Recording

- Engineered at Starstruck Studios, Nashville, Tennessee and Echo Studio, Los Angeles, California
- Vocal session recorded at The Attic, Nashville, Tennessee

Personnel

- All vocals – Kelly Clarkson
- Engineering – Alex Pasco
  - Additional engineering – Jesse Shatkin, Julian Burg
    - Assistant engineering – Todd Tidwell
- Bass, engineering, guitar, keyboards, production, and programming – Greg Kurstin
- Mastering – Chris Gehringer
- Mixing – Serban Ghenea
  - Engineered for mixing – John Hanes
- Recording – Christopher Dye, John Denosky
- Songwriting – Matthew Koma
- Vocal production – Jason Halbert

== Charts ==
Chart (2015)	Peak position
South Korea International Singles (Gaon)	98

== See also ==
- Love–hate relationship
