= Cruel Intentions (soundtrack) =

Cruel Intentions: Music From The Original Motion Picture

Soundtrack album by Various Artists
- Released: March 9, 1999 (U.S.)
- Genre: Alternative rock
- Label: Virgin Records

Cruel Intentions is the compilation soundtrack to the 1999 film of the same name. The film's soundtrack peaked at #60 on the Billboard 200.

== Information ==
The songs "Push It" by Garbage, "If You Tolerate This Your Children Will Be Next" by Manic Street Preachers, "How Soon Is Now?" by Love Spit Love, "6 Underground" by Sneaker Pimps, and "Cut the Cord" by Pushmonkey were used in promotional spots for the film. None of the promotional songs appear on the soundtrack. Also according to the commentary, The Smashing Pumpkins song "To Sheila" was considered, but the rights couldn't be obtained. Although the song "Lovefool" by The Cardigans was featured in the film, it too was not featured in the soundtrack.

Music composer John Ottman had originally created an entire musical score for the film but it was rejected and Ed Shearmur was hired to compose new music. Ottman's score was moody and sophisticated, but the producers had instead opted for a more pop/rock-oriented soundtrack. Ottman, not wanting to let his hard work go to waste, released his music in an album through Varèse Sarabande called Music Inspired by the Film Cruel Intentions: Suites and Themes from the Scores of John Ottman, which featured 10 tracks of his original score plus tracks from his work on other films and TV shows, including Halloween H20: 20 Years Later, Apt Pupil, and Fantasy Island.

== Tracks ==
No.	Title	Performer(s)	Length
1.	"Every You Every Me" (Single Mix)	Placebo	3:36
2.	"Praise You" (Radio Edit)	Fatboy Slim	3:23
3.	"Coffee & TV"	Blur	5:18
4.	"Bedroom Dancing (First Recording)"	Day One	3:48
5.	"Colorblind"	Counting Crows	3:24
6.	"Ordinary Life"	Kristen Barry	4:56
7.	"Comin' Up From Behind"	Marcy Playground	3:41
8.	"Secretly"	Skunk Anansie	4:45
9.	"This Love"	Craig Armstrong (featuring Elizabeth Fraser)	6:26
10.	"You Could Make A Killing"	Aimee Mann	3:34
11.	"Addictive"	Faithless	4:17
12.	"Trip On Love"	Abra Moore	4:16
13.	"You Blew Me Off"	Bare, Jr.	2:39
14.	"Bitter Sweet Symphony" (Album Version)	The Verve	5:57

== Charts ==
Album

Year	Chart	Position
1999	New Zealand Album Chart	15
1999	The Billboard 200	60

== Certifications ==
Region	Certification	Certified units/sales
Austria (IFPI Austria)	Gold	25,000^{*}
Canada (Music Canada)	Gold	50,000^{^}
France (SNEP)	2× Gold	200,000^{*}
New Zealand (RMNZ)	Gold	7,500^{^}
United Kingdom (BPI)	Gold	100,000^{*}
United States (RIAA)	Gold	500,000^{^}
^{*} Sales figures based on certification alone.^{^} Shipments figures based on certification alone.
