= Street date =

Date in which a product is released to the public

In business, a street date is the date a particular product is to be released for sale to the general public.

Typically, retailers receive shipments of stock prior to its street date release, so that the product can be placed on display shelves for store opening that day. Shipments come marked very clearly with a "do not sell before release date" label designating a street date mandated by the distributor. Shipments may sometimes arrive up to three weeks in advance.

Retail outlets can be severely punished by manufacturers for releasing a product even a day before the street date, a process known as "breaking street." One example of this is with the launch of Warner Home Video's DVD titles, while the street date was set for March 25, 1997; some retailers sold the format's releases one day earlier on the 24th. If a retailer breaches the contract establishing a street date, the manufacturer may impose fines, may withdraw privileges to distribute future products from that manufacturer, and may file a lawsuit to enforce the contract.
