= Heartbeat Song (Kelly Clarkson song) =

Single by Kelly Clarkson

from the album Piece by Piece
- Released: January 12, 2015
- Recorded: 2014
- Studio: Echo Recording Studio, Los Angeles, California
- Genre: Synth-pop
- Length: 3:18
- Label: RCA
- Songwriters: Mitch Allan; Kara DioGuardi; Jason Evigan; Audra Mae
- Producer: Greg Kurstin

Kelly Clarkson singles chronology
| "Wrapped in Red" (2014) | "Heartbeat Song" (2015) | "Invincible" (2015) |

Music video
- "Heartbeat Song" on YouTube

"Heartbeat Song" is a song by American singer Kelly Clarkson from her seventh studio album, Piece by Piece (2015). Written by Mitch Allan, Audra Mae, Kara DioGuardi, and Jason Evigan, the song is an uptempo synth-pop track produced by Greg Kurstin. Lyrically, it sings of meeting a person who restores someone's faith in love. Inspired by 1980s synth-pop music, "Heartbeat Song" was released by RCA Records as the album's lead single on January 12, 2015.

"Heartbeat Song" was released to a positive response from music critics, who complimented the song's production and praised Clarkson's decision to return to mainstream pop music. Other critics, however, noted the strong resemblance the song's melody bore to that of Jimmy Eat World's single "The Middle" (2001), which later allowed the band to be credited as additional songwriters. Commercially, the single debuted on the Billboard Hot 100 chart at number 37 and has peaked at number 21, marking Clarkson's sixteenth top 40 hit on the chart. It also became her fifth song to top the Billboard Hot Dance Club Songs chart and marked as her highest debut among her twenty career entries on the Billboard Adult Top 40 chart. Internationally, it became a top ten hit single in Austria, Iceland, Poland, Slovenia, South Africa, and the United Kingdom while also becoming a top 20 hit in the national charts of the Czech Republic, Germany, Mexico, Slovakia and Sweden.

Directed by Marc Klasfeld, its accompanying music video features scenes of various downtrodden people and their process of finding love again. Clarkson premiered "Heartbeat Song" in a live televised performance on The Graham Norton Show in February 2015 and has performed it on The Tonight Show Starring Jimmy Fallon and the fourteenth season of American Idol. The song was nominated for Best Pop Solo Performance at the 58th Annual Grammy Awards.

== Background and composition ==
"Heartbeat Song" (2015)
According to Audra Mae, Kara DioGuardi came up with the lyric "This is my heartbeat song and I'm gonna play it!", as sung by Clarkson in this 27-second sample of "Heartbeat Song".

Shortly after the release of her first Christmas album, Wrapped in Red (2013), Clarkson, despite her pregnancy, began to record material for her seventh studio album, with a target release date in 2014. One of these tracks, "Heartbeat Song", is an uptempo synthpop track produced by Greg Kurstin., Lyrically, the song sings of meeting a person who restores someone's faith in love. Sonically, USA Today's Brian Mansfeld remarked that the record serves as sonic defibrillator, starting with a jolt of melody, its rhythms shifting a couple times before finally settling into its steady pulse; while Idolator's Bradley Stern described its production as Top 40 radio-friendly and remarked that the track sees Clarkson's pulse raising while falling in love above kicky drums, guitars and hints of synths.

"Heartbeat Song" was written by Mitch Allan, Audra Mae, Kara DioGuardi, and Jason Evigan in a two-day session writing camp. In an interview on Entertainment Tonight, Mae revealed that DioGuardi came up with the main idea and used it as the song's chorus, with everybody else contributing in. After pitching the song to different artists, including Demi Lovato, she later found out during the Christmas season that Clarkson had recorded it and planned to release the song as the album's lead single.

Musically, the song is written in the key of G-flat major with a fast tempo of 149 beats per minute. It follows the chord progression G♭–B♭m7–E♭m–C♭, and Clarkson's vocals span from G♭_{3} to E♭_{5}.

== Release and reception ==
In January 2015, Clarkson revealed a set of clues for the single, posting the words "Proof of life and Dr. Dre #TheNextEpisode (sic)". On January 7, 2015, she announced January 12, 2015, as its release date as a digital download by RCA Records, followed by a release to Mainstream Top 40 radio stations in the United States on January 13, 2015. A CD single was also issued by RCA's parent company Sony Music Entertainment on March 6, 2015.

=== Critical response ===
"Heartbeat Song" garnered positive reviews from music critics, with Clarkson's return to mainstream pop music lauded, along with her vocals. Billboard's associate editor Jason Lipshutz gave the song 4/5 stars, writing the song's production and vocals sounded invigorated. Reviewing for Rolling Stone, Jon Dylan gave the song a three-and-a-half star rating, describing it as a "warm, fuzzy snuggle-fest." In his midweek review for Spin, assistant editor Brennan Carley wrote that the song is "a Kurstin production that sparkles with new-found passion" and said Clarkson sings a lyric of the chorus with a bubblegum snap. In his review for music website Popdust.com, Jason Scott gave the song an "A−" grade, saying that song would fit quite nicely to Clarkson's previous studio album All I Ever Wanted (2009). He also added that despite the song's the chorus isn't quite as "tasty" as what she's capable of, it's just as momentous as her previous singles such as "Mr. Know It All" (2011) and "Breakaway" (2004). Reviewing for Time, Nolan Feeney wrote that "Heartbeat Song" as more of a celebration of that than a hungry comeback, reminding listeners of what Clarkson has so reliably provided over the years, with just a few souped-up adjustments. He also praised Kurstin's production and Clarkson's "arena-ready pipes", describing the song as "slick, sugary and incredibly catchy — everything you want in a pop song, really". The song has been nominated for the Choice Music Single: Female Artist category for the 2015 Teen Choice Awards.

Critics also compared "Heartbeat Song" to Jimmy Eat World's single "The Middle" (2001) due to a notable similarity between the melodies of the songs' verses, as well as their choruses. In his review for Idolator, Stern observed both songs' similitude. Hunter Hauk of The Dallas Morning News also remarked of the two songs' similarities, but was ambivalent of "Heartbeat Song"'s lack of innovation as compared to Clarkson's previous lead singles. Digital Spy rated this song with 2 stars out of 5 and concluded by describing it: "ruthless in its pursuit of earworm status, and like it or not it'll find itself lodged in the inner vestibules of your brain.

=== Chart performance ===
On the chart week ending January 31, 2015, "Heartbeat Song" debuted on the Billboard Hot 100 chart at number 37 with 70,000 copies of digital downloads, becoming her 16th top 40 hit on the chart. It also marked as her third highest debut among her 25 career entries, following "Never Again", and "Mr. Know It All", which debuted at number 8 and number 18 respectively. On the chart week ending February 21, 2015, it moved to a peak of number 21. The song also debuted on other Billboard charts, including the Billboard Mainstream Top 40 chart, the Billboard Adult Contemporary chart, the Billboard Trending 140 and the Billboard Adult Top 40 chart, where it entered at number 20, marking a career-high for Clarkson. On July 23, 2015, "Heartbeat Song" was certified Platinum by RIAA for selling a million copies. In Canada, "Heartbeat Song" debuted on the Billboard Canadian Hot 100 chart at number 37 on the chart week ending January 31, 2015. In Australia, it entered the ARIA Singles Chart at number 51 on the chart week ending January 26, 2015. In the United Kingdom, the song debuted at number 7 on the Official UK Singles Chart, becoming Clarkson's ninth song to reach the chart's top 10. As of April 24, 2016 is sold over 362,000 copies in the United Kingdom. In addition, "Heartbeat Song" had attained a chart position in the national charts of Austria, Germany, Spain, and Sweden; and has also charted in the airplay charts of Czech Republic, Denmark, the Netherlands, Slovakia.

As of September 2017, the song has sold over 909,000 copies in the US.

=== Awards and nominations ===
At the 2015 Teen Choice Awards, "Heartbeat Song" was nominated for Choice Music Single: Female Artist. For the 58th Annual Grammy Awards the song is nominated for Best Pop Solo Performance. In 2016 Audra Mae won ASCAP Pop Music Award for co-writing the song. In May 2016, the song won at the 64th Annual BMI Pop Awards.

== Music video ==
On January 26, 2015, RCA released an animated lyric video for "Heartbeat Song", featuring heartbeat graphs of Clarkson and three other radio guests in Nashville using an ECG monitor. Directed by Marc Klasfeld, its accompanying music video premiered on February 5, 2015, on Vevo. It was filmed in Nashville, Tennessee.

=== Synopsis ===
The video depicts scenes of various heartbroken people unexpectedly finding a chance to love again. These scenes are inter-cut with footage of Clarkson performing the track in a colorful background. Upon its premiere, the video had received a generally positive response, with mild criticism targeting a scene depicting a couple kissing through the opposite seating sides of a bench. In his coverage for Spin, Carley remarked that there are some surprisingly deep moments tracing the journey from loss to happiness in the video. Reviewing for Yahoo! Music, senior editor Wendy Geller wrote that despite the video's concept may sound hokey, but the idea that life can change from dark to light in an instant (couple with Clarkson's buoyant vocals) is irresistible.

== Live performances ==
Clarkson premiered "Heartbeat Song" in a live televised performance on the British television programs The Graham Norton Show on February 20, 2015, and Loose Women on March 2, 2015. She also performed the song on The Tonight Show Starring Jimmy Fallon on March 2, 2015, Good Morning America on March 3, 2015, iHeartRadio Music Awards on March 29, 2015, and on The Ellen DeGeneres Show, on April 3, 2015. On April 2, 2015, Clarkson performed the song on the fourteenth season of American Idol where she was also the guest mentor for the top 8 as part of the "Evening with Kelly Clarkson" week. Clarkson performed the song in a medley with "Since U Been Gone" and "Stronger (What Doesn't Kill You)" on the season three finale of La Voix in Montreal on April 12, 2015. Additionally, Clarkson performed the song at the Summertime Ball hosted by Capital FM on June 6, 2015. In July 2015, Clarkson performed the song on Macy's 4th of July Spectacular on NBC.

== Track listing ==
All tracks are written by Kara DioGuardi, Audra Mae, Jason Evigan, Mitch Allan.

Digital download
| No. | Title | Length |
|---|---|---|
| 1. | "Heartbeat Song" | 3:18 |

CD
| No. | Title | Length |
|---|---|---|
| 1. | "Heartbeat Song" | 3:18 |
| 2. | "Heartbeat Song" (Lenno Remix) | 3:16 |

Digital download – Didrick Remix
| No. | Title | Length |
|---|---|---|
| 1. | "Heartbeat Song" (Didrick Remix) | 3:15 |

Digital download – The Remixes EP
| No. | Title | Length |
|---|---|---|
| 1. | "Heartbeat Song" (Lenno Remix) | 3:17 |
| 2. | "Heartbeat Song" (Dave Audé Radio Mix) | 3:48 |
| 3. | "Heartbeat Song" (Frank Pole Radio Mix) | 3:24 |
| 4. | "Heartbeat Song" (Nebuer Remix) | 3:56 |
| 5. | "Heartbeat Song" (Ikon Radio Mix) | 3:18 |
| 6. | "Heartbeat Song" (Skrux Remix) | 4:34 |

== Credits and personnel ==
Credits adapted from the "Heartbeat Song" metadata.

Personnel

- Kelly Clarkson – all vocals
- John Denosky – engineering
- Chris Dye – engineering
- Greg Kurstin – bass, engineering, recording, guitar, keyboards, production, programming
- Alex Pasco – recording
- Serban Ghenea – mixing
- John Hanes – mixing engineer

== Charts ==
=== Weekly charts ===
Weekly chart performance for "Heartbeat Song"
| Chart (2015) | Peak position |
|---|---|
| Australia (ARIA) | 29 |
| Austria (Ö3 Austria Top 40) | 8 |
| Belgium (Ultratip Bubbling Under Flanders) | 7 |
| Belgium (Ultratip Bubbling Under Wallonia) | 6 |
| Canada Hot 100 (Billboard) | 23 |
| Canada AC (Billboard) | 4 |
| Canada CHR/Top 40 (Billboard) | 37 |
| Canada Hot AC (Billboard) | 9 |
| Czech Republic Airplay (ČNS IFPI) | 25 |
| Czech Republic Singles Digital (ČNS IFPI) | 12 |
| Denmark Airplay (Tracklisten) | 16 |
| Euro Digital Song Sales (Billboard) | 8 |
| Finland Airplay (Radiosoittolista) | 43 |
| France (SNEP) | 84 |
| Germany (GfK) | 16 |
| Hong Kong (HKRIA) | 29 |
| Hungary (Editors' Choice Top 40) | 20 |
| Hungary (Stream Top 40) | 23 |
| Iceland (RÚV) | 6 |
| Ireland (IRMA) | 23 |
| Italy (FIMI) | 89 |
| Japan Hot 100 (Billboard) | 78 |
| Japan Hot Overseas (Billboard) | 11 |
| Japan Adult Contemporary (Billboard) | 12 |
| Mexico Inglés Airplay (Billboard) | 16 |
| Netherlands (Dutch Top 40 Tipparade) | 3 |
| Netherlands (Single Top 100) | 71 |
| New Zealand (Recorded Music NZ) | 21 |
| Poland Airplay (ZPAV) | 10 |
| Poland (Polish Airplay New) | 1 |
| Scottish Singles Sales (Official Charts) | 3 |
| Slovakia Airplay (ČNS IFPI) | 14 |
| Slovakia Singles Digital (ČNS IFPI) | 19 |
| Slovenia (SloTop50) | 10 |
| South Africa Airplay (EMA) | 4 |
| South Korea International Singles (Gaon) | 7 |
| Spain (Promusicae) | 36 |
| Sweden (Sverigetopplistan) | 20 |
| Switzerland (Schweizer Hitparade) | 24 |
| UK Singles (Official Charts) | 7 |
| US Billboard Hot 100 | 21 |
| US Adult Contemporary (Billboard) | 2 |
| US Adult Pop Airplay (Billboard) | 6 |
| US Dance Club Songs (Billboard) | 1 |
| US Pop Airplay (Billboard) | 19 |

=== Year-end charts ===
2015 year-end chart performance for "Heartbeat Song"
| Chart (2015) | Position |
|---|---|
| Austria (Ö3 Austria Top 40) | 71 |
| Canada (Canadian Hot 100) | 82 |
| Germany (Official German Charts) | 95 |
| Slovenia (SloTop50) | 23 |
| UK Singles (Official Charts Company) | 90 |
| US Billboard Hot 100 | 91 |
| US Adult Contemporary (Billboard) | 8 |
| US Adult Top 40 (Billboard) | 19 |
| US Dance Club Songs (Billboard) | 46 |

== Certifications ==
Sales and certifications for "Heartbeat Song"
| Region | Certification | Certified units/sales |
|---|---|---|
| Australia (ARIA) | Gold | 35,000^{^} |
| Germany (BVMI) | Gold | 200,000^{‡} |
| New Zealand (RMNZ) | Platinum | 30,000^{‡} |
| Norway (IFPI Norway) | Gold | 20,000^{‡} |
| Sweden (GLF) | Platinum | 40,000^{‡} |
| United Kingdom (BPI) | Platinum | 600,000^{‡} |
| United States (RIAA) | Platinum | 1,000,000^{‡} |
^{^} Shipments figures based on certification alone.^{‡} Sales+streaming figures based on certification alone.

== Release history ==
List of release dates, showing region, release format, label catalog number, and reference
| Region | Date | Format(s) | Label | Catalog number | Ref |
|---|---|---|---|---|---|
| Worldwide | January 12, 2015 | Digital download | Sony Music | GBCTA1400065 | |
| United States | January 12, 2015 | Digital download | RCA | GBCTA1400065 | |
| United States | January 13, 2015 | Mainstream contemporary hit radio | RCA | —N/a | |
| United Kingdom | February 22, 2015 | Digital download | RCA | GBCTA1400065 | |
| Worldwide | February 24, 2015 | Digital download – The Remixes EP | Sony Music | 886445111613 | |
| Europe | March 6, 2015 | CD | Sony Music | 88875079082 | |
| Worldwide | March 11, 2015 | Digital download – Didrick Remix | Sony Music | GBCTA1500034 | |

== See also ==
- List of UK top 10 singles in 2015
- List of number-one dance singles of 2015 (U.S.)
