= Miracle on Broadway =

Music concert

- Benefit concert by Kelly Clarkson
- Venue: Bridgestone Arena
- Associated album: Wrapped in Red
- Date(s): December 20, 2014; December 18, 2015(cancelled); December 16, 2016
- Duration: 120 minutes
- No. of shows: 3
- Attendance: 12,985
- Box office: US$524,964

Miracle on Broadway was an annual Christmas benefit concert by American recording artist Kelly Clarkson. Presented by Live Nation, the first of a planned annual series of benefit concerts was held at the Bridgestone Arena in Nashville, Tennessee on December 20, 2014 and featured musicians Reba, Trisha Yearwood, Garth Brooks, Ronnie Dunn, Kacey Musgraves, Hayley Williams, Chad Gilbert, Charles Esten, Meghan Trainor, Martina McBride, Kix Brooks, and Deborah Allen performing renditions of various Christmas songs and tracks from Clarkson's Christmas album Wrapped in Red (2013). The concert raised over US$500,000 ticket sales and donations for four charities based in Nashville: Monroe Carell Jr. Children's Hospital at Vanderbilt, Monroe Harding Children’s Home, Second Harvest Food Bank, and Thistle Farms. Clarkson had also announced plans to turn Miracle on Broadway into an annual benefit concert and planned to hold one in Bridgestone Arena on December 18, 2015. However, this concert was cancelled due to Clarkson's health complications during her second pregnancy. The 2016 concert was held on December 16, 2016.

== Background ==
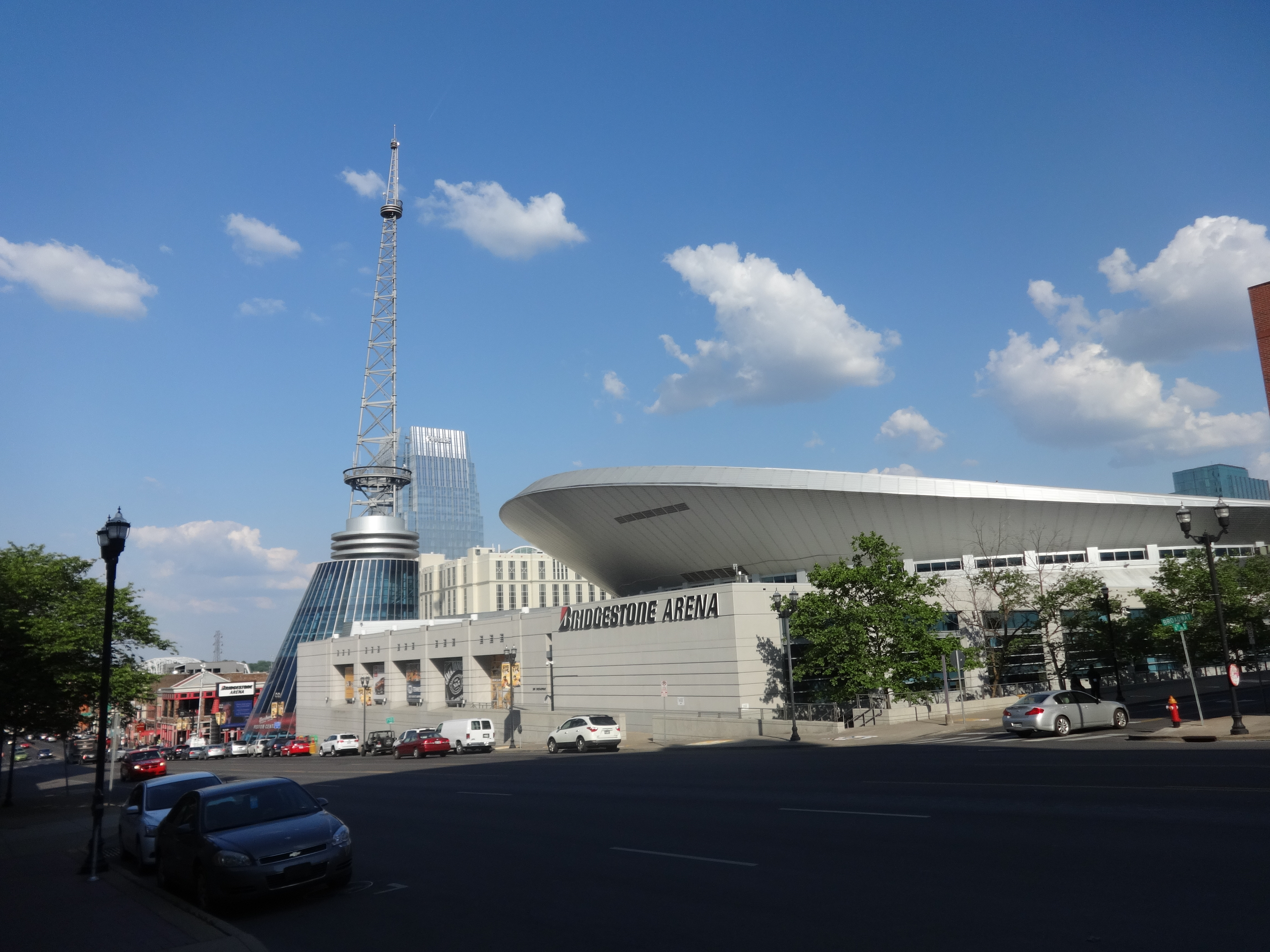
Miracle on Broadway was named after the Broadway Street, a major road in Nashville, Tennessee and the site of the Bridgestone Arena (pictured).

During the 2014 fall season, Clarkson conceived the idea of organizing a benefit concert during a rush-hour commute from Nashville to Hendersonville, Tennessee while preparing the release of her seventh studio album Piece by Piece (2015). She had originally planned to organize a small concert for an intimate audience. But upon presenting the idea to her manager Narvel Blackstock, the concept developed into an arena concert featuring prominent musicians who at some point had lived in Nashville. Together, they invited Reba McEntire, Clarkson's mother-in-law and Blackstock's wife. She recalled, "I figured if I got (McEntire), everyone would have to say yes. I've never asked an artist to do anything other than sing with me which a lot of people had said no and it hurts my feelings, which is okay." Clarkson later invited a various set of musicians: Trisha Yearwood, Garth Brooks, Ronnie Dunn, Kacey Musgraves, Hayley Williams, Chad Gilbert, Charles Esten, Meghan Trainor, Martina McBride, Kix Brooks, and Deborah Allen. She revealed, "I basically guilted people into it. And it was a very brave thing for me." Dolly Parton, whom she had also invited, had to turn down the offer due to scheduling conflicts. Clarkson had also revealed that other recording artists had also turned down the offer for the same reason but promised to participate for a 2015 concert. On the September 5, 2015 date of her Piece by Piece Tour at the Bridgestone Arena, she announced that the 2015 edition of the benefit concert would be held on December 18, 2015. She later announced that the concert in 2015 had been cancelled because of her health problems but promised to hold another concert in 2016. The concert in 2016 was held on December 16 and the guest musicians included Reba McEntire, Ronnie Dunn, Kelsea Ballerini, RaeLynn, Charles Esten, The SteelDrivers and more.

Clarkson, who was raised in modesty prior to winning the television competition American Idol in 2002, has cited that the main objective for Miracle on Broadway was to raise funds for Nashville charities as a means to give back to the community. She recalled, "We grew up in a duplex and a trailer. We grew up working really hard. We don't want to punish (our children) for being born into a family with money, but we want to make sure that they are a part of things like this from the get go. You can't grow up in your little world. There's a whole world out there, and there's people that are in need and to know how lucky they are." Blackstock had originally proposed to hold the concert for the 2015 Christmas season, but Clarkson insisted to hold it in 2014, after down-scaling the promotional campaign for her Christmas album Wrapped in Red in 2013 due to her then-pregnancy. Inspired by the title of the 1947 holiday feature Miracle on 34th Street, she named the concert as Miracle on Broadway after the Broadway Street, a major avenue and Bridgestone Arena's primary address in Nashville. Proceeds from the fundraising will be sent to the Community Foundation of Middle Tennessee for distribution to four Nashville charities: Monroe Carell Jr. Children's Hospital at Vanderbilt, Monroe Harding Children’s Home, Second Harvest Food Bank, and Thistle Farms. Clarkson remarked that the four charities were not randomly selected, saying "I have visited each of these organizations, and come to know the people who run them and volunteer and the people they serve. I am so grateful and proud to call Nashville home."

== Concert overview ==
Miracle on Broadway's first concert at the Bridgestone Arena was held on December 20, 2014, just 84 days after Clarkson had made its concept. All of the acts performed only performed various Christmas songs throughout the concert, while Clarkson performed the tracks from Wrapped in Red and holiday tunes she had previously recorded, except for "Winter Wonderland", "Santa Claus Is Comin' to Town", "Hard Candy Christmas", "Jingle Bell Rock", "The Christmas Song", and "All I Want for Christmas Is You". Some of the featured artists performed with Clarkson in her numbers, such as Esten (who was featured on "Santa Claus Is Coming to Town"), McBride (featured on "The Christmas Song"). In addition to performing their own versions of holiday tunes: Dunn, Reba, and Yearwood, whom Clarkson had featured in Wrapped in Red, also performed with her in their respective songs on the album. While Aben Eubanks, Ashley Arrison, and Shane McAnally, Clarkson's co-writers for "Wrapped in Red", sang with her in a Bluebird Cafe-style performance. Other featured musicians also performed solely, such as Trainor, Williams with Gilbert, Kix Brooks with Allen, Musgraves, and Garth Brooks. Clarkson remarked in an interview that "They all picked awesome songs to sing." The whole concert lasted for over two hours.

=== Boxscore ===
Prior to closing Miracle on Broadway with "All I Want for Christmas Is You", Clarkson revealed that the concert was sold out and had raised over US$200,000 had through ticket sales, texting and online donations. Yearwood and Garth Brooks also announced that they are matching every dollar raised on the show, which totaled to over US$400,000. According to Billboard's Boxscore chart and Live Nation, the event had raised US$524,964 in their final tally.

== Set list ==
All songs were performed by Clarkson, unless noted:

2014

20th December 2016

1. "Underneath the Tree"
2. "Please Come Home for Christmas"
3. "Winter Wonderland"
4. "My Favorite Things"
5. "Santa Claus Is Comin' to Town" (featuring Charles Esten)
6. "Have Yourself a Merry Little Christmas"
7. "Every Christmas"
8. "Hard Candy Christmas"
9. "Wrapped in Red" (featuring Aben Eubanks, Ashley Arrison, and Shane McAnally)
10. "Under the Mistletoe" (performed solely by Meghan Trainor)
11. "White Christmas"
12. "Silver Bells" (performed solely by Clarkson's backup singers)
13. "Rockin' Little Christmas" (performed solely by Kix Brooks and Deborah Allen)
14. "Feliz Navidad" (performed solely by Kacey Musgraves)
15. "Jingle Bell Rock"
16. "Blue Christmas" (performed solely by Hayley Williams and Chad Gilbert)
17. "O Holy Night"
18. "The Christmas Song" (featuring Martina McBride)
19. "Christmas (Baby Please Come Home)" (performed solely by Martina McBride)
20. "Winter Dreams (Brandon's Song)"
21. "Baby, It's Cold Outside" (featuring Ronnie Dunn)
22. "Run Rudolph Run" (performed solely by Ronnie Dunn)
23. "Silent Night" (featuring Reba and Trisha Yearwood)
24. "Santa Claus Is Back in Town" (performed solely by Trisha Yearwood)
25. "I'll Be Home for Christmas" (performed solely by Reba)
26. "The Little Drummer Boy" (performed solely by Garth Brooks)
27. "All I Want for Christmas Is You"
2016

16th December 2016

1. "O Come, O Come, Emmanuel" (featuring WO Smith Choir)
2. "Please Come Home for Christmas"
3. "Merry Christmas Baby"
4. "Santa Baby (performed solely by RaeLynn)
5. "White Christmas"
6. "Hard Candy Christmas" (performed solely by Reba McEntire)
7. "Jingle Bell Rock" (performed solely by Reba McEntire)
8. "Softly and Tenderly" (featuring Reba McEntire and Tammy King)
9. "Breath of Heaven"
10. "Winter Dreams (Brandon's Song)"
11. "Santa Claus Is Comin' to Town" (performed solely by Charles Esten)
12. "Rudolph the Red-Nosed Reindeer" (featuring Charles Esten)
13. "Go Tell It on the Mountain" (featuring Hunter Hayes)
14. "Noel" (performed solely by Kennedy Noël)
15. "Winter Wonderland"
16. "My Favorite Things (performed solely by Kelsea Ballerini)
17. "Have Yourself a Merry Little Christmas (featuring Kelsea Ballerini)
18. "The Christmas Song (performed solely by Clarkson's backup singers)
19. "I'll Be Home for Christmas (performed solely by Ronnie Dunn)
20. "Wrapped In Red"
21. "Hangin' 'Round the Mistletoe" (featuring The SteelDrivers)
22. "Blue Christmas (featuring Steve Wariner)
23. "Christmas in Your Arms (performed solely by Steve Wariner)
24. "All I Want for Christmas Is You"
25. "Run Rudolph Run"
26. "Underneath the Tree"

== See also ==
- Kelly Clarkson's Cautionary Christmas Music Tale
