= Kelly Clarkson's Cautionary Christmas Music Tale =

- Title card
- Directed by: Hamish Hamilton
- Starring: Kelly Clarkson; Blake Shelton; Reba McEntire; Trisha Yearwood; Robin Williams; Whoopi Goldberg; William Shatner; Jay Leno; Matt Lauer; Danica Patrick; Heidi Klum; Ken Jeong; Jai Rodriguez; Morgan Bastin
- Country of origin: United States
- Original language: English

Production
- Executive producer: Ian Stewart
- Production locations: The Venetian Las Vegas, Nevada, USA
- Running time: 60 minutes
- Production company: Done and Dusted

Original release
- Network: NBC
- Release: December 11, 2013

Kelly Clarkson's Cautionary Christmas Music Tale is a 2013 Christmas television special produced by Done and Dusted for NBC. Directed by Hamish Hamilton, it stars Kelly Clarkson, Blake Shelton, Reba McEntire, Trisha Yearwood, Robin Williams, Whoopi Goldberg, William Shatner, Jay Leno, Matt Lauer, Danica Patrick, Heidi Klum, Ken Jeong, Jai Rodriguez and Morgan Bastin. It is a musical comedy pastiche loosely based on Charles Dickens's 1843 novella A Christmas Carol where Clarkson's character learns the true meaning of Christmas, accompanied by the music of her sixth studio album Wrapped in Red.

With its musical performances filmed live at The Venetian Las Vegas on October 30, 2013, the television special itself was broadcast on December 11, 2013 on NBC in the United States. The special won a Gold World Medal for best Variety Special in the New York Festival's International Television & Film Awards. The special was re-aired on December 23, 2014 and December 17, 2015.

== Plot ==
The story is narrated by a little girl (Morgan Bastin), who sits in a chair and reads the story from a book.

Kelly's career has been fading, so she, her manager (Ken Jeong) and her assistant Chad (Jai Rodriguez) make a plan to revive it. Kelly decides to do a Christmas special and makes a deal with an NBC executive (William Shatner) that many celebrities will star in her special. She also says that children will benefit from the special, although it is only a pretext to have more publicity for the special. Kelly promotes it on The Tonight Show with Jay Leno.

She manages to get Reba McEntire and Trisha Yearwood to sing "Silent Night" with her on her special by blackmailing them. Kelly wants more celebrities including George Clooney. Nevertheless, everyone including Whoopi Goldberg, Robin Williams, Danica Patrick and Heidi Klum declines. Kelly is furious and fires her assistant Chad. The only one who wants to participate is Blake Shelton but Kelly is afraid that he would overshadow her. She makes him sew her dresses and iron them. When he asks her what she wants to do for the finale, she is not paying much attention and replies that probably something with elves.

On the night of the finale, Kelly faces the humiliation of being unable to get any celebrities to join her. She panics and runs away from the theater, where the special is shot. Outside, it is snowing. Kelly encounters a man begging on the street with a little girl. The man turns out to be Chad and the girl is his little sister, Poppy. When he sees that Kelly is cold, he gives her his coat and takes her to a shelter where he lives now. Kelly is moved when she sees all the homeless children who live there. Chad give some sweets to the children and Poppy gives her own candy cane to Kelly. Kelly is touched by her generosity and realizes that she was wrong and that Christmas is not about her career. Having nothing else to give, she sings "White Christmas" to the people in the shelter. When she finishes, Chad tells her that he managed to get George Clooney on the phone and that he was available for the special. Much to his surprise, Kelly only wishes Merry Christmas to Clooney and hangs up.

Meanwhile, a video of Kelly singing "White Christmas" has gone viral on YouTube, having more than 25 million views, and the fact is announced by Matt Lauer. When the celebrities who refused to participate in the special before see it, they call Kelly as they want to be a part of the show now. Nevertheless, Kelly does not pick up her phone. Instead she invites Poppy to join her on stage and sing "Underneath the Tree". When Kelly heads home after the performance, she meets Blake Shelton who is wearing an elf costume. He bitterly yells at her for not including him into her special, claiming that he is "way too cool for this". The story ends with the narrator saying "and they all lived happily ever after" to which Kelly replies "for the most part, anyway" and winks at the camera.

The narrator finishes the story and bids the viewers farewell and a happy holiday.

== Production ==
Kelly Clarkson's Cautionary Christmas Music Tale marked the first time Clarkson solely hosted a Christmas special. She had previously headlined the An American Idol Christmas and Kelly, Ruben & Fantasia: Home for Christmas with Ruben Studdard and Fantasia Barrino, both of which were aired on Fox in 2003 and 2004, respectively. Clarkson cited the 2003 Christmas feature film Elf as one of her inspirations, she remarked: "I wanted to tell a real story, make a new classic, not just do some skits that aren't really related." Ian Stewart, the television special's executive producer, said it will feature a full narrative from the beginning to end. He remarked, "the spine is her singing. We'll have a young girl, narrating the story, sitting in an overstuffed chair in front of an amazing fire, reading the story from a book. And yes, it starts with 'once upon a time' and ends with 'happily ever after.'" Stewart, through his company Done and Dusted, had previously produced television events such as the Victoria's Secret Fashion Show and the 2012 Summer Olympics opening ceremony, revealed producing a Christmas special presents similar challenges, citing: "Supermodels in lingerie is a very lovely thing, but if that's all you give, like chocolate, it makes you sick, so you keep refreshing, to keep people excited. And that's what makes you go back to the core—in this case, to see Kelly sing." The television special aired on December 11, 2013 on NBC in the United States. According to NBC, the story is based loosely on Charles Dickens' novella A Christmas Carol, during which Clarkson’s character learns about the true meaning of Christmas. It also shares certain metafictional aspects of Mel Brooks' Silent Movie, particularly the device of framing cameo appearances by celebrities as requests for such appearances.

== Setlist ==
- "Run Run Rudolph"
- "Silent Night" with Reba McEntire and Trisha Yearwood
- "My Favorite Things"
- "Wrapped in Red"
- "Please Come Home for Christmas"
- "Have Yourself a Merry Little Christmas"
- "White Christmas"
- "Underneath the Tree"

== Cast ==
- Kelly Clarkson
- Blake Shelton
- Reba McEntire
- Trisha Yearwood
- Robin Williams
- Whoopi Goldberg
- William Shatner
- Jay Leno
- Matt Lauer
- Danica Patrick
- Heidi Klum
- Ken Jeong
- Jai Rodriguez
- Morgan Bastin
- Gianna Archuleta

== Music ==
Clarkson revealed that the television special would be a part comedy and part musical performance, to which Stewart added, "The story is a way to refresh the palate, so viewers go, 'Oh, my God, she sounds beautiful. Let's hear her sing!' You want to remind them why they're there." The music of Kelly Clarkson's Cautionary Christmas Music Tale features the songs from her sixth studio album Wrapped in Red. The television special's musical performances were taped in front of a live audience at The Venetian Las Vegas on October 30, 2013, a day after Wrapped in Red's street release. It features special guests Reba McEntire, Trisha Yearwood, and Ronnie Dunn, accompanied by twenty-nine musicians and a choir. RCA Records also announced plans to release some of the television special's performances as music videos, such as "Silent Night", performed by Clarkson, McEntire and Yearwood.

== Release ==
On October 21, 2014, the special was released on a bonus DVD with Wrapped in Red as a part of Walmart exclusive reissue.

== See also ==
- List of adaptations of A Christmas Carol
- Miracle on Broadway
