= Wolanin =

Wolanin is a surname. Notable people with the surname include:

- Adam Wolanin (1919–1987), Polish American soccer forward
- Christian Wolanin (born 1995), Canadian-born American ice hockey defensemen
- Craig Wolanin (born 1967), American ice hockey defensemen
- Mary Opal Wolanin (1910-1997), Americain nurse
- Vincent Wolanin, American entrepreneur in Philadelphia
- Whitney Wolanin (born 1990), American singer and songwriter
