= Prizefighter (disambiguation) =

A prizefighter is someone who competes in a contest between fighters for a prize, a sum of money, etc.; for example a professional boxer or mixed martial artist.

Prizefighter or Prize Fighter may also refer to:

== Video games and boxing ==
- Don King Presents: Prizefighter, a 2008 video game by 2k Sports
- Prize Fighter (video game), a 1993 video game by Digital Pictures
- Prizefighter series, a knockout boxing tournament

== Music ==
- PrizeFighter: Hit After Hit, a 2014 album by Trisha Yearwood
  - "PrizeFighter" (song), a song from the album featuring Kelly Clarkson
- Prizefighter (album), a 2026 album by Mumford & Sons
- "Prizefighter", a 1980 single by British band Jigsaw
- "Prize Fighter", a song by The Killers from the deluxe edition of Battle Born
- "Prizefighter", a song by Eels from Hombre Lobo and Wonderful, Glorious
- "Prizefighter", a song by Bush from the album The Science of Things (1999)

== Film ==
- The Prize Fighter, a 1979 American comedy film
- Prizefighter: The Life of Jem Belcher, a 2022 biographical drama film

== Television ==
- "Prize Fighter", a season 6 episode of The Loud House

== People ==
- A notable nickname for Kevin Owens (born 1984), Canadian professional wrestler
