= PrizeFighter (song) =

2014 song by Trisha Yearwood and Kelly Clarkson

Single by Trisha Yearwood featuring Kelly Clarkson

from the album PrizeFighter: Hit After Hit
- Released: September 15, 2014
- Studio: Allentown Studios (Nashville, TN)
- Genre: Country
- Length: 3:41
- Label: RCA Nashville; Gwendolyn
- Songwriters: Jessi Alexander; Sarah Buxton; Ross Copperman
- Producer: Mark Miller

Trisha Yearwood singles chronology
"The Call" (2013)	"PrizeFighter" (2014)	"Broken" (2016)

Kelly Clarkson singles chronology
"Underneath the Tree" (2013)	"PrizeFighter" (2014)	"Wrapped in Red" (2014)

"PrizeFighter" is a song by American singer Trisha Yearwood and the titular song from her studio album, PrizeFighter: Hit After Hit (2014). Written by Jessi Alexander, Sarah Buxton, and Ross Copperman, it features background vocals from American singer Kelly Clarkson. An uplifting country ballad, "PrizeFighter" was released on September 15, 2014 by RCA Records Nashville and Gwendolyn Records as the lead single from the album.

== Background ==
After releasing Heaven, Heartache and the Power of Love, Yearwood parted ways with Big Machine Records and ventured into other projects, such as starring in her own television program, Trisha's Southern Kitchen, on Food Network. From 2008 to 2013, she only appeared as a guest vocalist on the albums of other recording artists — such as Everything Is Fine by Josh Turner, Mr. Lucky by Chris Isaak, Blame It All on My Roots: Five Decades of Influences by Garth Brooks, and Wrapped in Red by Kelly Clarkson. In 2014, she launched her own record label, Gwendolyn Records, and together with Brooks, her husband, she entered on a joint venture deal with RCA Records Nashville. She remarked: "We wanted to be on the same label because we thought it would be easier and more fun because we want to do duet records, we wanted to be able to do whatever we wanted and we've never been on the same record label, so it was kind of born out of looking to find a home that wanted to work with both of us."

"PrizeFighter" marked Yearwood's first single as a primary act in six years since releasing "They Call It Falling for a Reason" in 2008. It is also her second collaboration with Clarkson, the first being "Silent Night" from Clarkson's Christmas album, Wrapped in Red (2013). Written by Jessi Alexander, Sarah Buxton, and Ross Copperman, "PrizeFighter" is an inspirational country ballad. Yearwood chose to record the song primarily because of its lyrical content, saying that "PrizeFighter" is a song about beating the odds and fighting, no matter what. She remarked: "I think it's a message that we all need to hear." She also revealed that the song reminded her of her mother, who died of cancer in 2011, stating: "When I hear this song I see everything about my mom. I think about her. I think about the soldiers I visited at Walter Reed [National Military Medical Center]. I think about little kids going to school and getting bullied. There's so many things going through my head. It's a really cool song and it just seemed like the right title for this album."

== Critical reception ==
Giving it a "B+", Bob Paxman of Country Weekly wrote that "she belts out this empowerment tune with conviction [and] the soulful boldness we've come to expect" and "the anthemic nature of the song seems to call for dual voices, particularly on the chorus", although he added that "lyrically, 'PrizeFighter' contends only in the middleweight division, striking one as a cross between a high school coach's pep talk and one of those affirmation cards".

== Release ==
"PrizeFighter" was released by Gwendolyn Records and RCA Records Nashville on country radio as the lead single from the album on September 15, 2014, four days before Yearwood's 50th birthday. It was the fourth most-added song at country radio during its release week.

== Live performances ==
The song has been performed live by Yearwood on the Garth Brooks World Tour with Trisha Yearwood. Kelly Clarkson has made surprise appearances at the September 5 and 19, 2014 shows to sing with Yearwood. Normally, Garth Brooks sings Clarkson's part.

== Commercial performance ==
"PrizeFighter" debuted at number 59 on the Billboard Country Airplay chart.

== Charts ==
Chart (2014)	Peak position
US Country Airplay (Billboard)	42

== Release history ==
Release date, showing region, release format, and label
Region	Date	Format	Label
United States	September 15, 2014	Country radio	Gwendolyn Records, RCA Records Nashville
