= Winter Dreams (Brandon's Song) =

2013 song by Kelly Clarkson

Song by Kelly Clarkson

from the album Wrapped in Red
- Recorded: 2013
- Studio: Echo Recording Studios (Los Angeles, CA)
- Genre: Christmas; neo-jazz; pop
- Length: 3:22
- Label: RCA
- Songwriters: Kelly Clarkson; Ashley Arrison; Aben Eubanks
- Producer: Greg Kurstin

"Winter Dreams (Brandon's Song)" is a song by American recording artist Kelly Clarkson, from her sixth studio album, Wrapped in Red (2013). Produced by Greg Kurstin, Clarkson co-wrote the song with Ashley Arrison and Aben Eubanks for her then-fiancé, Brandon Blackstock, stepson of American recording artist Reba McEntire. A slow-tempo Christmas neo-jazz pop song, "Winter Dreams" features a 50-piece chamber orchestra conducted and arranged by film composer Joseph Trapanese. Its lyrical theme mainly depicts love and escapism during the holidays, in which Clarkson sings about spending her first holiday with Blackstock, to whom the song is also dedicated. Unlike the deep lyrical themes of "Every Christmas", in which she refers to her life before meeting Blackstock, Clarkson had described "Winter Dreams" with a lighter fare, referring to it as her holiday life after meeting him.

Upon the release of Wrapped in Red, "Winter Dreams" has received a fairly positive response from music critics, who described it as a sweet but not too saccharine Christmas song. Along with other tracks from the album, it entered the Billboard Holiday Digital Songs chart as an album cut at number 12 on the week ending November 16, 2013.

== Production and composition ==
"I wrote "Every Christmas" about those deep emotions that you go through during the holidays, when it's supposed to be a happy time, but you're just like, "OK, every Christmas, I keep thinking it's going to change, and it doesn't," Then "Winter Dreams" is kind of after we were together and we got engaged. Christmas changes, it morphs, it comes to life a little more... It’s just a happier time."

— Clarkson on the contrasting themes of "Every Christmas" and "Winter Dreams" after being with Blackstock.

Discussions for Clarkson's sixth studio album being a Christmas release began in December 2012, during which she also began to write holiday-themed material. Clarkson, weary of being expected to release only pop and country songs, approached Greg Kurstin to produce the whole album, and together they began recording in May 2013. Kursin, who had a jazz musical background, experimented on various jazz styles and sounds which Clarkson welcomed. During the song's recording production, he brought in Joseph Trapanese to arrange and conduct a 50-piece chamber orchestra at the EastWest Studios in Los Angeles.

A slowtempo Christmas neo-jazz pop song, "Winter Dreams" was written by Clarkson with Ashley Arrison and Aben Eubanks, her longtime friends. Eubanks, her guitarist, also wrote the songs "Wrapped in Red" and "Every Christmas" on the album. Clarkson wrote the song for then-fiancé (now ex-husband) Brandon Blackstock, whom she married on October 20, 2013, just days before the Wrapped in Red's release. Blackstock, a talent manager, is a stepson of recording artist Reba McEntire, Clarkson's longtime collaborator and friend. She described "Winter Dreams" as an antithesis of "Every Christmas", with the former about after finding love during the holidays and the latter about before it. Matt Casarino PopMatters found the music as reminiscent as Grizzly Bear's "Two Weeks" (2009), but blossoms into a heartfelt, joyful ode to holiday love.

== Critical response ==
Cassarino, describing it as charming, remarked that listeners can easily picture the snowflakes on Clarkson's eyelashes as she sings it. In his review, Brandon Baker of Philadelphia described it as a "total cheesefest", but also noted it as an excellent representation marital bliss. Slant Magazine's Sal Cinquemani described "Winter Dreams" as a sweet (but not too saccharine) tribute to her new husband, but borders on a commercial jingle. Melinda Newman of HitFix described the track as "perky and sweet" and fits in well with the lighthearted tone of the other originals, even if it suffers in comparison. In his review for Breathecast.com, Timothy Yap wrote that "Winter Dreams" is an indulgent love song that as its title suggests—is dreamy, cozy and so romantic.

== Chart performance ==
On the week ending November 16, 2013, "Winter Dreams" charted on the Billboard Holiday Digital Songs chart as an album cut at number 12. It also charted on the Gaon Singles Chart in South Korea at number 94 on the week ending November 23, 2013.

== Credits and personnel ==
Credits adapted from the Wrapped in Red liner notes.

Recording

- Produced at Echo Recording Studio, Los Angeles, California
- Orchestra recorded at EastWest Studios, Los Angeles, California

Personnel

- Vocals – Kelly Clarkson
- Arrangement – Joe Trapanese
- Engineering – Jesse Shatkin, Alex Pasco
- Bass, engineering, guitar, keyboards, production, and programming – Greg Kurstin
- Drums – Aaron Redfield
- Mixing – Serban Ghenea
  - Engineered for mixing – John Hanes
- Orchestra contractor – Sandy DeCrescent, Gina Zimmitti
- Recording – Satoshi Noguchi
- Songwriting – Kelly Clarkson, Ashley Arrison, Aben Eubanks

== Charts ==
Chart (2013)	Peak position
South Korea International Singles (GAON)	94
US Holiday Digital Songs (Billboard)	12
