= Wrapped in Red =

Studio album by Kelly Clarkson
- Released: October 25, 2013
- Recorded: 2013
- Studios: Echo Studios and EastWest Studios (Los Angeles, California); The Barn and Starstruck Studios (Nashville, Tennessee)
- Genres: Pop; jazz; country; Memphis soul
- Length: 46:49
- Label: RCA
- Producer: Greg Kurstin

Kelly Clarkson chronology
Greatest Hits – Chapter One (2012)	Wrapped in Red (2013)	Piece by Piece (2015)

Singles from Wrapped in Red
- 1. "Underneath the Tree" Released: November 5, 2013; 2. "Wrapped in Red" Released: November 25, 2014

Wrapped in Red is the first Christmas album and sixth studio album by American singer Kelly Clarkson, released on October 25, 2013, by RCA Records. The album is a follow-up to her first greatest hits album, Greatest Hits – Chapter One, and its companion extended play, The Smoakstack Sessions Vol. 2. Produced by Greg Kurstin, it was her only record to be solely released by RCA. Wrapped in Red consists of sixteen tracks, featuring five original songs co-penned by Clarkson and eleven cover versions of Christmas standards and carols, two of which are duets featuring singers Ronnie Dunn, Reba McEntire and Trisha Yearwood.

Weary of constantly being asked for her primary genre, Clarkson had long desired to record a Christmas album as a means to defy genre limitations. She commissioned Kurstin, who had studied jazz music under the tutelage of Jaki Byard, to produce the entire album. Drawing inspirations from the soundtracks of A Charlie Brown Christmas and White Christmas, as well as the Christmas albums by Mariah Carey, McEntire, and Phil Spector, they experimented with various styles and sounds throughout the album. The Christmas music of Wrapped in Red comprises a variety of genres such as pop, jazz, country, and soul, marking a departure from the pop rock sound established from Clarkson's previous studio albums, while its lyrics share a singular theme of the color red, which represents a plethora of emotions during the holidays.

Wrapped in Red debuted on the Billboard 200 chart at number 3 and topped the Billboard Top Holiday Albums chart with 70,000 copies sold in its first week of release. For nine consecutive weeks, Wrapped in Red stayed on the top ten of both charts and was certified platinum by the Recording Industry Association of America and Music Canada. By the end of 2013, it became the year's best-selling Christmas release in the United States and the second best-selling Christmas release in Canada. Its lead single, "Underneath the Tree", became an international top forty Christmas hit song and was radio's most-played new holiday song of 2013. In promoting Wrapped in Red Clarkson appeared in red dresses on various televised appearances and filmed an accompanying television special, Kelly Clarkson's Cautionary Christmas Music Tale, at The Venetian Las Vegas, which premiered on NBC on December 11, 2013. In 2014, Clarkson released the title track as the second single and hosted the Christmas benefit concert, Miracle on Broadway, at the Bridgestone Arena from 2014 to 2016.

== Background ==
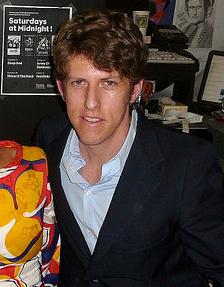
The entirety of Wrapped in Red was produced by Greg Kurstin, with whom Clarkson had first collaborated on her fifth studio album Stronger.

Clarkson had expressed interest in recording a Christmas album for years, having recorded various Christmas songs such as "Oh Holy Night" and "My Grown Up Christmas List" on the American Idol: The Great Holiday Classics (2003), "I'll Be Home for Christmas" on iTunes Session (2011), and being featured on Blake Shelton's Christmas album Cheers, It's Christmas (2012). Weary of constantly being asked for her primary genre, she felt that recording a Christmas album would finally pave a way for her to explore other different genres. She remarked, "I always get asked what genre I'm in: 'Is this country or pop or rock? What are you?' And what's cool about making the Christmas album was, 'Oh, there are no limitations! We can do whatever we want!'". She further added, "The thing about Christmas is that it almost doesn't matter what mood you're in or what kind of a year you've had—it's a fresh start. I'm going to clear the air and take stock of the good that's happened."

Discussions about making her sixth studio album being a Christmas record began in December 2012, a month after releasing her first greatest hits album, Greatest Hits – Chapter One. Having found the opportunity to do so, Clarkson commissioned producer and multi-instrumentalist Greg Kurstin, whom she had previously collaborated with on her albums Stronger and Greatest Hits – Chapter One, to solely produce the whole album. Despite having been raised in the Jewish faith and unfamiliar with Christmas songs, Kurstin agreed to produce the project. As a result, the record marked the second time her studio album only had a single producer (the first being David Kahne solely producing My December in 2007). It also marked the fourth time Kurstin had solely produced an entire studio album apart from being a member of the musical groups The Bird and the Bee and Geggy Tah (the first three being Lily Allen's It's Not Me, It's You in 2009, Sia's We Are Born in 2010, and The Shins' Port of Morrow in 2012).

== Recording ==
Recording sessions of the basic instrumental tracks for Wrapped in Red took place in Kurstin's Echo Studio in Los Angeles, while orchestral sessions were recorded at EastWest Studios in Hollywood and vocals in The Barn studio in Nashville. While recording tracks for the album, Clarkson and Kurstin played with many sounds, wanting showcase as many different styles as they could. Kurstin recalled: "It was a lot of fun for us because we got to go back to our roots. When Kelly started singing, it was clear she had the chops and had been trained to do anything." He further added: "We really experimented. It was so much fun and liberating. And it pays off." Kurstin, who studied with jazz musician Jaki Byard at The New School for Jazz and Contemporary Music, recruited various jazz and soul musicians such as James Gadson, Kevin Dukes, Roy McCurdy, and Bill Withers to perform on the record in order to resonate a Memphis soul sound. He also collaborated with Joseph Trapanese to arrange and conduct a chamber orchestra.

"Wrapped in Red"
The Wall of Sound is prominently resonated in this 27-second sample of "Wrapped in Red".

Providing instrumentation for the record, Kurstin used all of his instruments, such as a Mellotron and a Chamberlin, and taped them from a distance to simulate the Wall of Sound, a recording technique originally developed by Phil Spector that was popular in the early 1960s. He enlisted Clarkson to provide all the background vocals herself. Clarkson, who grew up singing in a choir, was pleased with the aspect, saying: "Blending is something I knew how to do from childhood. Sometimes I'd have to do an alto instead of a soprano because they needed a bigger sound. But I've never had to do anything like this before—doing all my backup vocals, essentially being my own choir." Together, they began to record in May 2013 and continued through the summer of that year, beginning by recording "White Christmas" with Clarkson in the vocal booth and with Kurstin on a piano. She commented: "The production is all him. I would be just like 'Hey, can we make this more jazz? Hey, can we make this more bluesy. And he just, like Harry Potter, made this happen. It's so weird."

== Composition ==
=== Theme and influences ===
There's something about it that represents so many deep emotions, whether it's love or lust or envy or pain or beauty.

—Clarkson on the color red being used as the album's primary theme

Clarkson has cited the color red as the album's only theme. A color traditionally associated with Christmas, she affiliated the color to various emotions in the holidays. Wanting to stray away from her usual pop sound, she described Wrapped in Red's music as a representation to explore different genres such as jazz, country and Memphis soul. She recalled: "What's cool about Christmas albums is you can do jazz, rock and roll, you can do pop, you can do blues, like you can do all that stuff and it works—cause it's all classic and it's Christmasy sounding." She also noted that the album's multitude of styles positively contributed to her artistic goal, saying: "My best friend from childhood heard it and said, 'This is what you sound like, before everything else.' And I agree, It's my core sound. Back in the day, when artists came out with things like "Fall to Pieces" and "Bridge over Troubled Water", those songs transcended genres. It wasn't, 'Where is it going to fit?' You catered to whatever the song calls for. And that's exactly what I did—without having to have an umbrella for everything."

In gathering inspirations for Wrapped in Red, Clarkson started by listening to Bing Crosby's and Rosemary Clooney's contributions to the soundtrack of the 1954 feature film White Christmas, as well as Mariah Carey's Merry Christmas (1994) and Merry Christmas to You (1987) by Reba McEntire. While Greg Kurstin, who used to play in a jazz band, took influences from A Charlie Brown Christmas by the Vince Guaraldi Trio and A Christmas Gift for You by Phil Spector as his inspirations, which resulted in the album's Wall of Sound resonance. Clarkson also cited that her relationship with her then-fiancé Brandon Blackstock had inspired some of the album's lyrics.

=== Song analysis ===
Clarkson shares writing credits on all five original songs on Wrapped in Red, some of which were written in December 2012 to avoid writing Christmas tunes during the 2013 summer season. She co-wrote the opening and title track, "Wrapped in Red", with Ashley Arrison, Aben Eubanks, and Shane McAnally. A Christmas ballad, the song was inspired by a scene in the holiday feature film Love Actually (2003), in which someone confesses unrequited love towards another. Critics highlighted the track as the one that most effectively captures the essence of the Wall of Sound technique, a production style known for its dense, layered orchestration and echo-rich sound. The second track, "Underneath the Tree", was written by Clarkson and Kurstin, making it the first time they had co-written a track together. Clarkson remarked: "Greg and I have worked a lot together, but usually I just come in and I just sing. We've never have actually written a song together at this point. And he and I were like, 'Let's just try to write something for the record." RCA Records chief executive Peter Edge remarked that its release as a single was partly inspired by the success of "All I Want for Christmas Is You" by Mariah Carey. The following track is a rendition of the holiday standard "Have Yourself a Merry Little Christmas", which Clarkson had selected for its saccharine content.

Clarkson favored "Run Run Rudolph" as her favorite classic, saying: "Just because it got to be a little more rock and roll." She also remarked that "Please Come Home for Christmas (Bells Will Be Ringing)" was the first song selected for inclusion after her mother's recommendation and the song's melancholic lyrics. Written by Clarkson and Eubanks, "Every Christmas", was the first song to be written for the album. She revealed that the song narrates of her holiday life prior to meeting Brandon Blackstock, Reba McEntire's stepson, saying: "Every Christmas, I was just like, 'This is going to be different, right? I'm going to actually find someone and not be pathetically alone for the rest of my life?'". The seventh track is a cover of Elvis Presley's "Blue Christmas". Its follow-up, a rendition of "Baby, It's Cold Outside", features Ronnie Dunn. Clarkson had approached Dunn thinking that his personality suited the song's content well, saying: "Like, it's straight-up his personality to say all of that to try and get you to stay, and have a drink." "Winter Dreams (Brandon's Song)" was written by Clarkson, Arrison, and Eubanks as a companion piece to "Every Christmas". Dedicated to Blackstock, the song accounts her holiday after meeting him. She remarked: "Christmas changes, it morphs, it comes to life a little more… It's just a happier time."

The tenth track, "White Christmas", was the first song to be recorded for Wrapped in Red. A cover of Rodgers and Hammerstein's "My Favorite Things" follows up as the eleventh track. Clarkson opted for the Broadway performance of the song to stray away from Julie Andrews' version, citing: "I think you shouldn't go near anywhere of what she's doing because she's so good." Clarkson and Kurstin co-wrote "4 Carats" with Cathy Dennis and Livvi Franc. Originally written as a pop song, they converted it into a Christmas song to fit the album's theme, describing it as a crossover between Eartha Kitt's "Santa Baby" (1953) and Madonna's "Material Girl" (1984). A rendition of Imogen Heap's "Just for Now" was described by Clarkson as her highly dysfunctional environment, saying: "Can we just stop for like five minutes and have like a normal Christmas setting?" The song begins by sampling the melody of the Christmas tune "Carol of the Bells". The closing track, a rendition of the traditional carol "Silent Night", features McEntire and Trisha Yearwood and ends in an a cappella setting between the trio. In addition, two tracks were also included in the deluxe edition of the album: the first, Clarkson's cover of "I'll Be Home for Christmas" from her iTunes Session extended play, and the second, her rendition of the first stanza of the ecclesiastical hymn "Oh Come, Oh Come Emmanuel".

Kelly Clarkson co-wrote all five original songs on Wrapped in Red, starting in December 2012 to avoid writing Christmas music during the summer of 2013. The title track, "Wrapped in Red," inspired by a scene in Love Actually (2003), was praised for its Wall of Sound style. "Underneath the Tree," her first co-write with Greg Kurstin, became a standout single, inspired by the success of Mariah Carey's "All I Want for Christmas Is You." Clarkson also included classics like "Have Yourself a Merry Little Christmas," chosen for its sweetness, and "Run Run Rudolph," her favorite for its rock-and-roll vibe.

Other tracks included "Please Come Home for Christmas," recommended by her mother, and "Every Christmas," which reflected her longing for love before meeting her husband, Brandon Blackstock. She also wrote "Winter Dreams (Brandon’s Song)" as a companion piece about finding joy in Christmas after meeting him. Covers included Elvis Presley's "Blue Christmas," a duet of "Baby, It’s Cold Outside" with Ronnie Dunn, and a playful rendition of "4 Carats," blending Eartha Kitt's "Santa Baby" with Madonna's "Material Girl."

Unique additions included a cover of Imogen Heap's "Just for Now," which starts with "Carol of the Bells," and a trio performance of "Silent Night" with Reba McEntire and Trisha Yearwood. The deluxe edition featured her renditions of "I’ll Be Home for Christmas" and "Oh Come, Oh Come Emmanuel.

== Release ==
Wrapped in Red was first released internationally on October 25, 2013, by RCA Records through Sony Music Entertainment. It then received a North American release on October 29, 2013, by RCA as part of its holiday promotional campaign with the soundtracks to the feature films Black Nativity and The Best Man Holiday, with Wrapped in Red being promulgated as the one that will transcend formats and become a new holiday classic.

In an interview with Billboard, RCA marketing executive Aaron Borns remarked that the album was their main release of the holidays, quoting: "The angle on this album is that, like all great Christmas records, it's about amazing vocal performances. That's what this is intended to be – an album launched this year but timeless and genre-defying." In preparation for its release in the United States, RCA shipped a half-million units on Amazon.com and Target, which exclusively released a deluxe edition.

A red LP pressing of Wrapped in Red by United Record Pressing followed the CD release on November 25, 2013, marking the first time an album by Clarkson was released on a vinyl record. A deluxe LP and CD edition was also released on the Sony Music store, which included a scarf, a holiday ornament and a snow globe, all of which were decorated in red to match the albums theme.

An international promotion campaign was also planned for Clarkson, but was later halted due to her pregnancy. On October 21, 2014, Wrapped in Red was reissued by RCA with a special edition CD+DVD release exclusive to Walmart stores in the United States. A green LP pressing of the album would also be issued with a limited 500-copy release on December 9, 2014.

=== Promotion ===
On October 15, 2013, "White Christmas" was released as a promotional single from Wrapped in Red. Three days after, "Underneath the Tree" premiered on Clarkson's Vevo channel. A television Christmas special, titled Kelly Clarkson's Cautionary Christmas Music Tale, was filmed by concert director Hamish Hamilton on October 30, 2013, the eve after its street date, at The Venetian Las Vegas. A pastiche of A Christmas Carol, the Christmas special featured live performances of selections from Wrapped in Red (one of which featured Reba McEntire and Trisha Yearwood). Produced by Done and Dusted, Kelly Clarkson's Cautionary Christmas Music Tale premiered on NBC in the United States and Global in Canada on December 11, 2013, being pegged by RCA as the album's primary promotional medium. NBC's premiere broadcast of the special was seen by 5.31 million viewers, according to Nielsen Media Research. It also received a 1.4 share among adults between the ages of 18 and 49, and generated NBC's second biggest overall audience in its time slot. NBC had also a rerun broadcast of Kelly Clarkson's Cautionary Christmas Music Tale on Christmas Day, which was seen by an additional 3.54 million viewers.

Clarkson performing "Silent Night" on Kelly Clarkson's Cautionary Christmas Music Tale. For the entire duration of promoting Wrapped in Red, she wore a multitude of red Christmas dresses to symbolize the phrase "wrapped in red".

Clarkson also promoted Wrapped in Red in various televised performances, in all of which she was dressed in red attire. She first performed "Underneath the Tree" on The Today Show on November 26, 2013. On December 4, 2013, she performed "Run Run Rudolph" and "Blue Christmas" on the Christmas at Rockefeller Center television special. Clarkson had then performed "Underneath the Tree" on more televised events, such as on the fifth season of The Voice on December 3, 2013, The Ellen DeGeneres Show on December 5, 2013, and on Late Night with Jimmy Fallon on December 12, 2013. On December 25, 2013, Clarkson returned to The Today Show on its Christmas Day broadcast, performing "Blue Christmas". Selected tracks from the album were also used in advertisements, such as "Run Run Rudolph", which was used in a Belk holiday advertisement, and "Underneath the Tree", which was featured in an Amazon.com and Amazon Kindle Fire HDX advertisement with an appearance by Clarkson performing the song. The following year, on December 20, 2014, she hosted a Christmas concert, Miracle on Broadway, at the Bridgestone Arena. An annual Christmas benefit concert, Miracle on Broadway featured live performances of various Christmas songs by Reba McEntire, Trisha Yearwood, Garth Brooks, Ronnie Dunn, Kacey Musgraves, Hayley Williams, Charles Esten, and Meghan Trainor, some of whom joined Clarkson in performing selections from Wrapped in Red.

The lead single from Wrapped in Red, "Underneath the Tree", was released to radio airplay on November 5, 2013. Praised in its initial release, music critics approvingly compared the song to "All I Want for Christmas is You" and blazoned it as a future Christmas standard. Reviewing for Slant Magazine, Sal Cinquemani wrote that the track would likely become Clarkson's very own contemporary standard, while The Independent's Hugh Montgomery applauded it as "a winner on all fronts." After debuting on the Billboard Holiday 100 chart at number 34, it became a holiday top ten hit by peaking at number eight on the chart. It also topped the Billboard Adult Contemporary chart for four consecutive weeks, becoming Clarkson's third track and the fifteenth holiday song to top the chart. "Underneath the Tree" also charted on the main Billboard Hot 100 chart at number seventy-eight and became a top forty hit internationally, ranking on the Billboard Canadian Hot 100 chart, the Dutch Top 40 chart, and the UK Singles Chart. USA Today reported that "Underneath the Tree" was American radio's most-played new holiday song of 2013, while Edison Media Research reported that the single was the first holiday song to receive a considerable support on mainstream contemporary hit radio in almost 20 years. Wrapped in Red's second single, the title track, was serviced to radio airplay on November 25, 2014. On the week ending December 28, 2014, it debuted on the Billboard Adult Contemporary chart at number 11.

== Critical reception ==
Professional ratings
Aggregate scores
Source	Rating
Metacritic	73/100
Review scores
Source	Rating
AllMusic	3.5/5 stars
ABC News	3/5 stars
Country Weekly	5/5 stars
The Guardian	3/5 stars
HitFix	A
Newsday	A−
Slant Magazine	3.5/5 stars

At Metacritic, which assigns a normalized rating out of 100 to reviews from mainstream critics, the album received an average score of 73, based on 6 reviews, and scored higher than any other album by Clarkson. AllMusic's senior editor Stephen Thomas Erlewine gave it a rating of three-and-a-half out of five stars. He described its uptempo arrangements, as well as Clarkson's vocal performance, as "bold and brassy" and its mid-tempo arrangements as "even more alluring". He also noted the track selection "favors the bold," but that "she fares well in this setting, always sounding like the strongest element in the mix". Towards the end of his review, he wrote: "Perhaps the concept and execution are conventional, but even in this utterly expected setting, Clarkson retains her fiery, individual spirit, and that's what makes Wrapped in Red appealing: to the letter, it delivers what it promises." Sal Cinquemani of Slant Magazine also gave it a similar rating. He noted that the album "largely offers a respite from the pop-rock template she's been relentlessly pursuing since Breakaway, with less shouting and more of the varied range and texture on full display that helped crown her the winner of the inaugural season of American Idol. For better or worse, a decade of recording and touring has roughed up the edges of her voice, lending a lived-in quality that imbues lyrics about love and longing with an authenticity that might have otherwise been missing had she recorded these songs just a few years earlier." While ranking the "21 Best Christmas Albums of the 21st Century" six years later, he wrote for Billboard that "It's the album's five original songs, all co-written by Clarkson, that make Wrapped in Red the best Christmas album of the century so far."

NPR's Ken Tucker described the album as a "glossy but heartfelt work" and approvingly compared its contrasting philosophy to Nick Lowe's Quality Street: A Seasonal Selection for All the Family, both of which he described as "will put you in a holiday mood". Matt Casarino of PopMatters gave the album a generally favorable review, claiming that "Clarkson plays it safe and spends too much time showing off her upper register, but Wrapped in Red is a warm and romantic addition to the Christmas pop Zeitgeist," adding: "Wrapped in Red doesn't need edge; it's just dynamic and varied enough to be satisfying, and it's light-years better than any of the whitewashed Christmas crap Simon Cowell has inflicted on the world". Sarah Rodman of The Boston Globe gave a favorable review, particularly lauding "Underneath the Tree", and described Clarkson's rendering of the Christmas standards as "fairly straight". She added: "She starts gently on "Have Yourself a Merry Little Christmas" before belting out the money notes. She ambles assuredly through the soulful favorite "Please Come Home for Christmas (Bells Will Be Ringing)" and hangs by the piano for a torchy "White Christmas."

Newsday's music columnist Glenn Gamboa wrote that "Clarkson handles it all expertly – hitting remarkably high notes on "Have Yourself a Merry Little Christmas" and swinging jazzily on "Baby, It's Cold Outside" with Dunn. The new songs make Wrapped in Red a real gift, as the title track and "Underneath the Tree" channel the Phil Spector Christmas album; and "4 Carats" somehow blends "Stronger" and "Santa Baby". Reviewing for HitFix, Melinda Newman gave the album an "A" rating, praising Clarkson's vocal performances and noting that she and Greg Kurstin "have clearly studied legendary Christmas albums of yore—most notably Spector's A Christmas Gift For You and Andy Williams' Merry Christmas—to lovingly recreate Christmas standards, as well as craft new ones in the image of those sets." Chris Klimek of Slate declared Wrapped in Red as the best of 2013's new Christmas records, noting it for its vintage sound. He also observed that its five original tracks, most notably "Wrapped in Red" and "Underneath the Tree", "have reasonable odds of remaining in the yuletide rotation five years from now." In his review for The New York Times, Jon Caramanica wrote that "Clarkson is very likely the only singer working in pop with a real possibility of creating a modern holiday classic along the lines of Carey's "All I Want for Christmas Is You", and remarked that her takes on familiar songs, however accomplished, are "also faithful in the way that someone mindful of pop history would be."

== Commercial performance ==
Wrapped in Red became a commercial success in the United States. Prior to its release, music commercial analysts predicted that the album would likely sell at least 60,000 copies in its first week of release in the region, and foresaw it to be the front-runner as the bestselling holiday album of the season. On the week ending November 16, 2013, Wrapped in Red debuted on the Billboard 200 chart at number 3 with 70,000 copies sold throughout all retailers, a 93% decrease from Stronger's first week sales of 163,000 copies in 2011. Nielsen Music analyst Dave Bakula attributed its low performance to the falling market share of holiday music in general, which saw a 3.8 percent decrease in 2012. The album's chart debut on the Billboard 200 earned Clarkson her sixth consecutive top three studio album as well as the highest debut for a Christmas record by a female artist since Susan Boyle's first Christmas album, The Gift, debuted at the top of the chart in 2010. Wrapped in Red also debuted in three other different Billboard charts, most notably at the top of the Billboard Top Holiday Albums chart. On the week ending November 30, 2013, by charting at number six on the Billboard 200, the album became the lone Sony release inside the chart's top ten, with the others being Universal Music Group releases.

Despite its modest debut week, Wrapped in Red began to gain traction at the beginning of the holiday season, selling up to 131,000 copies during Thanksgiving week. It experienced its best sales week after benefiting from NBC's premiere broadcast of Kelly Clarkson's Cautionary Christmas Music Tale, selling up to 136,000 copies on its seventh week of release. For nine weeks it stayed in the top ten of the Billboard 200, the longest consecutive streak for any studio album by Clarkson. On December 5, 2013, the album was certified platinum by the Recording Industry Association of America, making it her fifth platinum studio album. Wrapped in Red subsequently became the bestselling Christmas release of 2013 by selling over 763,000 copies, according to Nielsen Soundscan, making her the first American female artist to have a number-one Christmas album in the Soundscan era. Twelve of the album cuts from Wrapped in Red also entered the Billboard Holiday Digital Songs chart during its first week of release – led by "Silent Night", "Have Yourself a Merry Little Christmas", and "Underneath the Tree" at numbers one, two, and four, respectively. Other songs also appeared in various other Billboard charts throughout the 2013 holiday season; songs such as "Blue Christmas" and "Please Come Home for Christmas (Bells Will Be Ringing)" charted on the Billboard Adult Contemporary chart, peaking at numbers 5 and 6, respectively, whereas "My Favorite Things", "Run Run Rudolph", "Please Come Home for Christmas (Bells Will Be Ringing)", "Silent Night" and "Wrapped in Red" peaked on the Billboard Canada AC chart at numbers 8, 7, 14, 22, and 49, respectively. "My Favorite Things" also charted on the Billboard Mexican Airplay chart at number 49, while "Silent Night" attained positions in both the Billboard Holiday 100 and Billboard Hot Country Songs charts, peaking at numbers 86 and 51, respectively. Amazon.com listed Wrapped in Red as their second bestselling album during the holiday season, and listed it as their sixth bestselling title of 2013. The album has sold 942,000 copies in the US as of September 2017. Also in 2014, the album re-charted at number seven on the Billboard Top Holiday Albums chart.

Internationally, Wrapped in Red had a relatively limited commercial performance. In Canada, the album debuted on the Billboard Canadian Albums chart at number 6 on the week ending November 16, 2013, making it her fifth top ten debut on the Nielsen-tracked chart. It peaked on the chart at number 5 on the week ending December 28, 2013. Wrapped in Red became the second bestselling Christmas album of 2013 in Canada with 67,000 copies sold in the region, behind A Christmas Gift to You by Johnny Reid. In Australia, the album debuted on the ARIA Albums Chart at number 82 on the week ending November 4, 2013, and peaked at number 29 on the week ending December 30, 2013. In Switzerland, it debuted on the Schweizer Hitparade at number 97 on the week ending November 10, 2013. In the United Kingdom, Wrapped in Red charted on the Official UK Albums Chart at number 65 on the week ending December 14, 2013. Despite its limited performance, Sony Corporation listed the album as their fifth bestselling release worldwide during the holiday season, which included albums, album cut tracks, and singles sales.

== Track listing ==
All tracks were produced by Greg Kurstin, with vocal production on "Every Christmas" done by Jason Halbert.

Wrapped in Red – Standard edition
No.	Title	Writer(s)	Length
1.	"Wrapped in Red"	Kelly Clarkson; Ashley Arrison; Aben Eubanks; Shane McAnally	3:36
2.	"Underneath the Tree"	Clarkson; Greg Kurstin	3:49
3.	"Have Yourself a Merry Little Christmas"	Ralph Blane; Hugh Martin	3:39
4.	"Run Run Rudolph"	Johnny Marks; Marvin Brodie	2:27
5.	"Please Come Home for Christmas (Bells Will Be Ringing)"	Charles Brown; Gene Redd	3:19
6.	"Every Christmas"	Clarkson; Eubanks	3:46
7.	"Blue Christmas"	Billy Hayes; Jay Johnson	2:52
8.	"Baby, It's Cold Outside" (featuring Ronnie Dunn)	Frank Loesser	3:01
9.	"Winter Dreams (Brandon's Song)"	Clarkson; Arrison; Eubanks	3:22
10.	"White Christmas"	Irving Berlin	3:02
11.	"My Favorite Things"	Oscar Hammerstein II; Richard Rodgers	2:49
12.	"4 Carats"	Clarkson; Kurstin; Cathy Dennis; Olivia Waithe	3:28
13.	"Just for Now"	Imogen Heap	3:30
14.	"Silent Night" (featuring Reba and Trisha Yearwood)	Franz Xaver Gruber; Joseph Mohr	4:09
Total length:			46:49

Wrapped in Red – Google Play exclusive reissue (bonus tracks)
No.	Title	Remix producer(s)	Length
15.	"Wrapped in Red" (Ruff Loaderz Radio Mix)	Julian Napolitano	3:38
16.	"Underneath the Tree" (Cutmore Christmas Sleigh Ride Radio Mix)	Richard Cutmore	3:57
Total length:			54:24

Wrapped in Red – Target, international deluxe edition, and 2020 digital deluxe reissue (bonus tracks)
No.	Title	Writer(s)	Length
15.	"I'll Be Home for Christmas" (from iTunes Session)	Buck Ram; Kim Gannon; Walter Kent	2:54
16.	"Oh Come, Oh Come Emmanuel"	Traditional	2:00
Total length:			51:43

Wrapped in Red – Walmart exclusive reissue (concert DVD)
No.	Title	Length
1.	"Run Run Rudolph"
2.	"Silent Night" (featuring Reba and Trisha Yearwood)
3.	"My Favorite Things"
4.	"Wrapped in Red"
5.	"Please Come Home for Christmas (Bells Will Be Ringing)"
6.	"Have Yourself a Merry Little Christmas"
7.	"White Christmas"
8.	"Underneath the Tree"

Notes

- "Just for Now" contains a portion of the composition "Carol of the Bells", written by Peter J. Wilhousky.
- Tracks from the concert DVD were taken from the filmed television special Kelly Clarkson's Cautionary Christmas Music Tale.
- "Silent Night" was later included as the ending track to McEntire's re-release holiday album My Kind of Christmas 4 years later.

== Personnel ==
Credits adapted from the album's liner notes.

Vocals

- Kelly Clarkson – all vocals (1–7, 9–13, 15, 16), vocals (8, 14)
- Ronnie Dunn]] – vocals (8)
- Reba – vocals (14)
- Trisha Yearwood – vocals (14)

Musicians

- Frank Abraham – bass (11)
- Sandy de Crescent – orchestra contractor (3, 5, 9, 11)
- Kevin Dukes – guitars (4)
- James Gadson – drums (4, 7)
- Jason Halbert – acoustic piano (15), Wurlitzer electric piano (15), Hammond B3 organ (15), programming (15)
- Chaun D. Horton – drums (11)
- Greg Kurstin – keyboards (1, 2, 9, 16), guitars (1, 2, 4–7, 9, 12, 13, 14), bass (1, 2, 4–7, 9, 12, 13, 14), drums (1, 2, 4–7, 12, 13, 14), programming (2, 12, 14), horn arrangements (2, 4, 5, 6, 11), orchestra arrangements (3, 5), acoustic piano (4–8, 10, 11, 12), organ (5, 6), strings (13)
- Roy McCurdy – drums (8)
- Miles McPherson – drums (15)
- Gabe Noel – bass (8)
- Einar Pedersen – bass (15)
- David Ralicke – baritone saxophone (2), tenor saxophone (2), trombone (2, 6), trumpet (2, 6), flugelhorn (2), mellophone (2), saxophones (6), horn arrangements (6)
- Aaron Redfield – drums (9)
- The Regiment Horns (4, 5, 11)
  - Leon Silva – saxophones
  - Lasim Richards – trombone
  - Sean Erick – trumpet
- Jesse Shatkin – programming (2)
- Left Shires – trumpet (15)
- Joseph Trapanese – orchestra arrangements and conductor (3, 5, 9, 11)
- Booker White – music preparation (3, 5, 9, 11)
- Gina Zimmitti – orchestra contractor (3, 5, 9, 11)

Production

- Steph Ashmore – wardrobe stylist
- Narvel Blackstock – manager
- Julian Burg – assistant engineer (5, 7, 14)
- Matt Coles – recording (8)
- Jeremy Cowart – photography
- Shawn Daugherty – assistant engineer (3, 5, 7, 8, 11)
- Ashley Donovan – make-up
- Ronnie Dunn – recording (8)
- Meghan Foley – art direction
- Chris Gehringer – mastering
- Serban Ghenea – mixing (1–14, 16)
- Jason Halbert – vocal producer (6), recording (15), mixing (15)
- John Hanes – mix engineer
- Greg Kurstin – producer, engineer (1–14, 16)
- Keith Naftaly – A&R
- Satoshi Noguchi – orchestra recording (3, 5, 9, 11)
- Alex Pasco – engineer (1–14, 16)
- Jesse Shatkin – engineer (1–14, 16)
- Todd Tidwell – assistant engineer (6, 14)
- Robert Ramos – hair stylist
- Starstruck Management Group – management company

Mixed and mastered at

- Mixed at MixStar Studios (Virginia Beach, Virginia)
- Mastered at Sterling Sound (New York City, New York)

== Charts ==
=== Weekly charts ===
Chart performance for Wrapped in Red
Chart (2013–2026)	Peak position
Australian Albums (ARIA)	29
Belgian Albums (Ultratop Flanders)	183
Canadian Albums (Billboard)	5
Danish Albums (Hitlisten)	32
Dutch Albums (Album Top 100)	6
French Digital Albums (SNEP)	165
German Albums (Offizielle Top 100)	10
German Pop Albums (Offizielle Top 100)	7
Greek Albums (IFPI)	62
Hungarian Albums (MAHASZ)	11
Irish Albums (IRMA)	64
Italian Albums (FIMI)	66
Japanese Hot Albums (Billboard Japan)	56
Latvian Albums (LaIPA)	73
Lithuanian Albums (AGATA)	27
Polish Streaming Albums (ZPAV)	38
Scottish Albums (Official Charts)	68
South Korean Albums (Circle)	68
Swiss Albums (Schweizer Hitparade)	97
UK Albums (Official Charts)	65
US Billboard 200	3
US Top Holiday Albums (Billboard)	1
US Indie Store Album Sales (Billboard)	19

=== Year-end charts ===
Year-end chart performance for Wrapped in Red
Chart (2013)	Position
US Billboard 200	170
US Top Holiday Albums (Billboard)	1
Chart (2014)	Position
Canadian Albums (Billboard)	19
US Billboard 200	17

=== Decade-end charts ===
Decade-end chart performance for Wrapped in Red
Chart (2010–2019)	Position
US Billboard 200	150

== Certifications ==
Region	Certification	Certified units/sales
Canada (Music Canada)	Platinum	80,000^{^}
Denmark (IFPI Danmark)	Gold	10,000^{‡}
Norway (IFPI Norway)	Gold	15,000^{‡}
United States (RIAA)	Platinum	1,000,000
^{^} Shipments figures based on certification alone.^{‡} Sales+streaming figures based on certification alone.

== Release history ==
List of release dates, showing region, label, formats, and catalog number
Region	Date	Label	Format(s)	Catalog number
Australia	October 25, 2013	Sony Music Entertainment	Deluxe edition CD and digital download	88883776232
Europe	October 25, 2013	Sony Music Entertainment	Deluxe edition CD and digital download	88883776232
Denmark	October 28, 2013	Sony Music Entertainment	Deluxe edition CD and digital download	88883776232
France	October 28, 2013	Sony Music Entertainment	Deluxe edition CD and digital download	88883776232
Brazil	October 29, 2013	Sony Music Entertainment	Deluxe edition CD and digital download	88883776232
Canada	October 29, 2013	Sony Music Entertainment	Deluxe edition CD and digital download	88883776232
Italy	October 29, 2013	Sony Music Entertainment	Deluxe edition CD and digital download	88883776232
United States	October 29, 2013	RCA Records	Standard edition CD and digital download	88837374125
United States	October 29, 2013	RCA Records	Target exclusive edition CD	88883776232
Japan	November 20, 2013	Sony Music Japan	Deluxe edition CD and digital download	SICP-3919
Canada	November 25, 2013	Sony Music Entertainment	Standard edition red LP	888430006812
Europe	November 25, 2013	Sony Music Entertainment	Standard edition red LP	888430006812
United States	November 25, 2013	RCA Records	Standard edition red LP	888430006812
United Kingdom	December 2, 2013	RCA Records	Deluxe edition CD and digital download	88883776232
New Zealand	December 6, 2013	RCA Records	Sony Music Entertainment	
United States	October 21, 2014	RCA Records	Walmart exclusive CD+DVD reissue	88875009092
United States	December 9, 2014	RCA Records	Limited edition green LP reissue	888430006812
United States	December 4, 2015	RCA Records	Google Play exclusive digital download reissue	—N/a

== See also ==
- Greg Kurstin production discography
- Best-selling Christmas/holiday albums in the United States
- When Christmas Comes Around...
