= Vincent Wolanin =

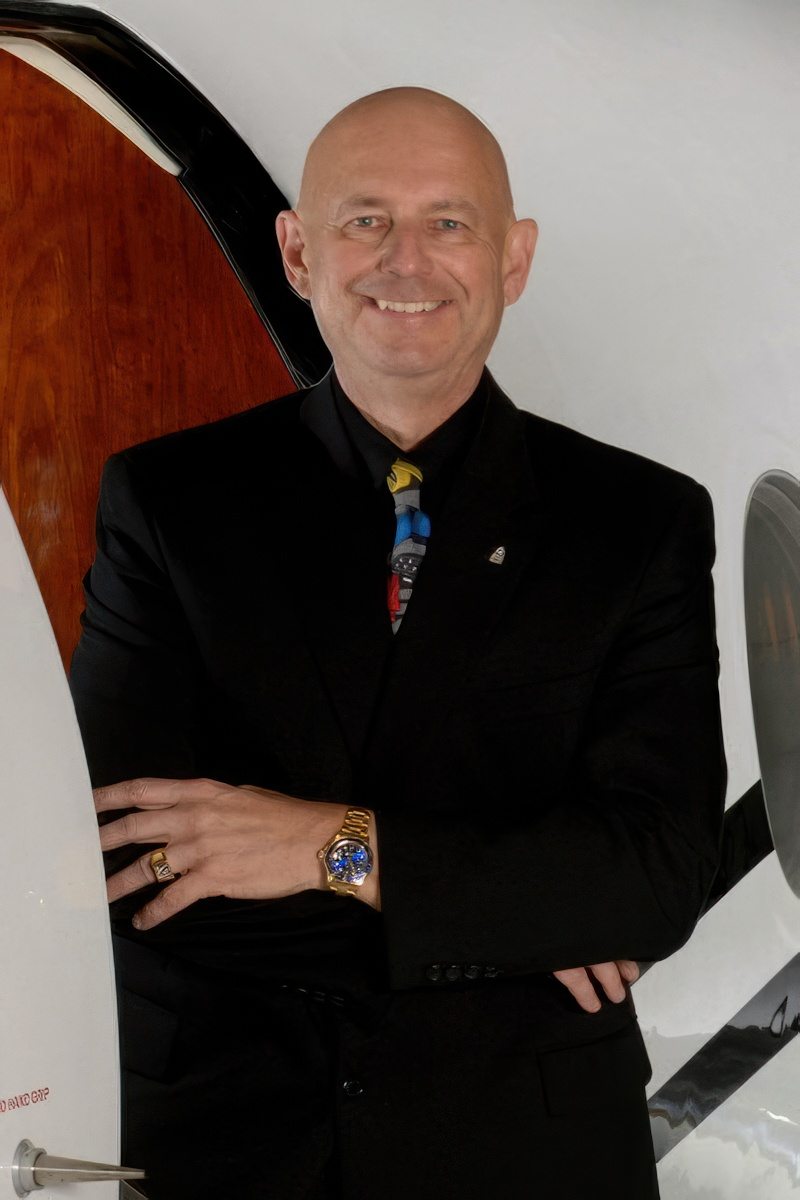
- Born: Philadelphia, Pennsylvania, US
- Education: Philadelphia University; Union College
- Occupations: Entrepreneur, record producer, racquetball player

Vincent M. Wolanin (/woʊˈlænɪn/;) is an American businessman and former professional racquetball player from Philadelphia, Pennsylvania, United States.

== Early life and education ==
Vincent M. Wolanin was born in Philadelphia, Pennsylvania, to Julia Solecki Wolanin and Vincent J. Wolanin, a state police detective. He has one brother, Gregory. Wolanin was educated at Father Judge High School, a Roman Catholic high school in Philadelphia. Father Judge later inducted him into their hall of fame in 2004. He gained his bachelor's degree from Philadelphia University in 1969 before attending graduate school at Union College.

During his undergraduate career, Wolanin was a member of both the Rams’ basketball and baseball teams, becoming a star pitcher for the latter. Wolanin's freshman season saw him emerge as the winning pitcher for four of the team's five victories, including a game against Rutgers that represented the Rams’ first-ever win against a major public university. He was awarded the university's lifetime innovation award in 2010 and inducted into the university's athletics hall of fame in 2012.

== Career ==
=== Construction ===
Shortly after graduating from Philadelphia University, Wolanin began a wholesale building materials business. The company supplied materials at high volume and shipped them directly to clients’ building sites, thereby bypassing the need for a warehouse. The construction arm of the business emerged when Wolanin secured a contract from a building materials client that was struggling to stay on schedule. An agreement was reached whereby the developer would be free to not pay Wolanin if the work was unsatisfactory. However, successfully completing the sections would result in the developer awarding the company as much work as it could accomplish.

Currently, Bethlehem Construction Corporation develops real estate across the United States with a focus on New York and Florida. In 1993 they constructed the world headquarters for fashion retailer Chico's. By 1994, it was estimated that they owned a total of 528,000 square feet of commercial space, valued at an estimated $42.4 million (equivalent to $92.1 million in 2025).

=== Music industry ===
Throughout the 1990s Wolanin managed a number of rock acts, including Vince Neil of Mötley Crüe and Brian Howe of Bad Company. During this time, Wolanin also began producing records, working with accomplished session musicians such as The Funk Brothers' Bob Babbitt.

=== Portsmouth F.C. ===
In 1997, Wolanin was involved in a bid to purchase Portsmouth Football Club with Brian Howe. Wolanin stood to gain not only a financial stake in the club, but also the chance to construct their new stadium. Portsmouth's director, Martin Gregory, met with Wolanin in Paris in January 1998. No other details of the potential deal were made public. In 2012 - with the club again facing financial ruin - the pair were again in talks over a potential takeover until Wolanin announced his decision to withdraw.

=== Aviation ===
In 1987, Wolanin founded PrivateSky Aviation Services Inc., a fixed-base operator and maintenance repair operation. The company is headquartered at Southwest Florida International airport in Fort Myers, Florida. Its MRO is notable for its exclusive focus on large cabin Gulfstream jets.

==== Response to Hurricane Ian ====
From October 1 to 15, 2022, PrivateSky served as the US Military’s base of operations for relief efforts relating to Hurricane Ian. Missions employed Chinook, Black Hawk, Lakota and Osprey aircraft and successfully rescued over 1,000 people. Military efforts were bolstered by EMS workers and volunteers, forming what President Biden termed “the largest search and rescue team ever assembled in the United States."

=== Philanthropy ===
In 2001, Wolanin created the Rockin' Christmas Fund, a charity that provides scholarships for students experiencing financial hardship due to the death of a parent or guardian. As of 2021, scholarships are offered at Thomas Jefferson University, Siena College, Florida Gulf Coast University, and Ave Maria University. The fund's charity concerts have included performances from Jimi Jamison of Survivor, Cliff Williams of AC/DC, Mickey Thomas of Jefferson Starship, Mike Reno of Loverboy, Bob Babbitt, and Whitney Wolanin.
