= Underneath the Tree =

2013 single by Kelly Clarkson

Single by Kelly Clarkson

from the album Wrapped in Red
- B-side: "Run Run Rudolph"
- Released: November 5, 2013
- Recorded: 2013
- Studio: Echo Studios (Los Angeles, CA)
- Genre: Pop
- Length: 3:49
- Label: RCA
- Songwriters: Kelly Clarkson; Greg Kurstin
- Producer: Greg Kurstin

Kelly Clarkson singles chronology
"Tie It Up" (2013)	"Underneath the Tree" (2013)	"PrizeFighter" (2014)

Music video
- "Underneath the Tree" on YouTube

"Underneath the Tree" is a Christmas song by American singer Kelly Clarkson from her sixth studio album and debut Christmas album, Wrapped in Red (2013). She co-wrote the track with its producer Greg Kurstin. Accompanied by various instrumental sounds, the song is given a Wall of Sound treatment, along with sleigh bells and bell chimes to create a Christmas atmosphere. "Underneath the Tree" was first released to Adult Contemporary radio stations on November 5, 2013, by RCA Records as the album's lead single.

"Underneath the Tree" has been praised by music critics, who considered it the main highlight of Wrapped in Red and recognized its potential to be a Christmas classic. They favorably compared it to Mariah Carey's 1994 Christmas song "All I Want for Christmas Is You". The track reached number seven on the Billboard Global 200 in addition to the top ten in Australia, Austria, Canada, Germany, Lithuania, the Netherlands, Switzerland, the United Kingdom, and the United States. It also charted within the top 20 in Belgium, the Czech Republic, Finland, Hungary, Ireland, Latvia, Luxembourg, Portugal, Singapore, and Slovakia. In 2021, "Underneath the Tree" was named ASCAP's most popular Christmas song released in the 21st century.

Directed by English director Hamish Hamilton, the music video for the song has a live performance from the television special Kelly Clarkson's Cautionary Christmas Music Tale at The Venetian Las Vegas. Apart from the television special, Clarkson has also performed it in various televised performances, such as Late Night with Jimmy Fallon and the American singing competition The Voice.

== Production and composition ==
"Underneath the Tree"
A 23-second sample of "Underneath the Tree". A Christmas pop song, critics from Billboard and HitFix noted how the song's instrumentation evoked Phil Spector's dense Wall of Sound approach.

After recording tracks for her greatest hits compilation, Greatest Hits – Chapter One, Clarkson began discussing with her record label RCA Records about plans for her sixth studio album being a Christmas release in late 2012, during which she also began to write original Christmas material. Greg Kurstin, whom she had previously collaborated with, was approached by Clarkson to produce the album; and together, they co-wrote the tracks "Underneath the Tree" and "4 Carats". "Underneath the Tree" was produced by Kurstin, who also played most of the instruments, including a mellotron and a Chamberlin, to evoke a Phil Spector's Wall of Sound treatment—a sound that Billboard and HitFix noticed upon hearing the song. He also had Clarkson provide all the voices in it, including all its backing vocals. She recalled the experience as new, stating, "I've never had to do anything like this before—doing all my backup vocals, essentially being my own choir."

"Underneath the Tree" is an uptempo Christmas pop song written by Clarkson and Kurstin. It is one of the five original songs recorded for Wrapped in Red. According to the sheet notes at Musicnotes published by EMI Music Publishing, the song is written in the key of E♭ major, in which the vocal range spans from E♭_{4} to G_{5}. Apart from the Wall of Sound, various other sounds, such as sleigh bells and bell chimes, are also prominently heard on the song, which features a bari saxophone solo on the bridge.

== Release ==
On October 18, 2013, Clarkson premiered "Underneath the Tree" on her Vevo channel. On November 5, 2013, RCA Records released it as a single on Adult Contemporary radio stations in the United States, while also planning to release it on Mainstream Pop stations. It was then released as a digital download in the United Kingdom on November 22, 2013, and in the United States on December 9, 2013. A digital EP containing remixes of the song was released internationally on December 17, 2013.

== Critical response ==
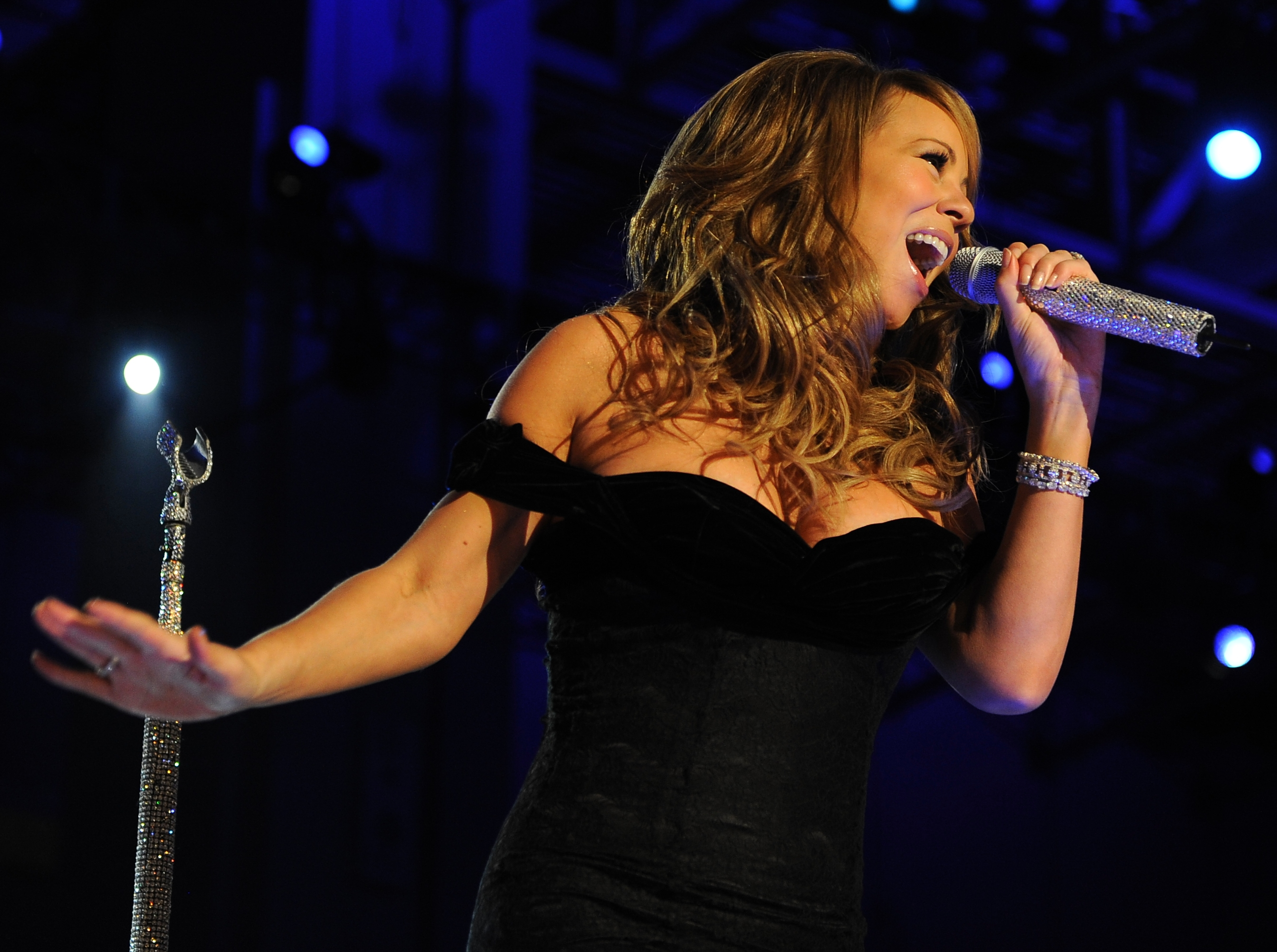
Critics approvingly compared "Underneath the Tree" to the 1994 Christmas track "All I Want for Christmas Is You", originally sung by Mariah Carey (pictured).

"Underneath the Tree" has received critical acclaim from various music critics on its release, who praised its catchiness and festive arrangement. Billboard's Marisa Fox called it the album's "biggest surprise", and described it as an optimistic tune that has Clarkson powering through Darlene Love-style vocals. Mikael Wood of the Los Angeles Times described it as a remarkably cheery single. In her review, Christina Vinson of Taste of Country remarked that the track "has everything a Christmas song could want: a jazzy, big band sound, saxophone and bells ringing, all bottled up in an optimistic and catchy holiday track" and said that Clarkson "shines", as her "strong vocals are needed to offset the snazzy production and chorus." In his review, Idolator's Carl Williott wrote that the song "sounds instantly familiar—sleigh bells, laments about a lonely Christmas day, a sax solo—but with a tightly coiled hook and Clarkson's transcendent voice, the whole thing is kind of invigorating." Sarah Rodman of The Boston Globe called it a bouncy, cooing number tailor-made to soundtrack sleigh rides, and named it the best track on the album.

Critics also approvingly compared it to Mariah Carey's "All I Want for Christmas Is You" (1994), a track that RCA chief executive Peter Edge described as the song's inspiration. Williot added that "Underneath the Tree" was "already practically a Christmas standard" one week after being released. Jenna Hally Rubenstein of MTV News remarked, "if we may be so bold, it is definitely on par with other impeccable Christmas originals—namely Carey's "All I Want For Christmas Is You"." Sal Cinquemani of Slant Magazine noted the similar themes of both songs, and that "Underneath the Tree" is likely to become Clarkson's very own contemporary standard. Melinda Newman of HitFix wrote, "It's a finger-popping, bell-ringing pleaser that could achieve that rare feat of becoming a new Christmas standard. That hasn't happened since Carey's "All I Want For Christmas" in 1994." The Independent's Hugh Montgomery called "Underneath The Tree" a "winner on all fronts" for having "sass, jingle, and a sax solo".

== Commercial performance ==
"Underneath the Tree" has recurrently charted annually since its 2013 release. It first entered the Billboard Holiday Digital Songs chart at number four on November 16, 2013, as part of Wrapped in Red. After its release as a single, it reached number three on December 28, 2013. The song also debuted at number 21 on the Billboard Adult Contemporary chart, reaching number one after three weeks, becoming Kelly Clarkson's third chart-topper in that category. Additionally, it entered the Billboard Holiday 100 chart at number 34 and later reached the top ten. On the Billboard Hot 100, it debuted at number 92 in December 2013, rising to number 78 by January 2014. "Underneath the Tree" re-entered the Hot 100 multiple times, climbing to number 44 in 2018, number 31 in 2019, number 30 in 2020, number nine in 2024 (becoming Clarkson 12th top-ten song), and finally number seven in December 2025. With this, Clarkson earned her 12th Hot 100 hit and her first since "Piece by Piece" in 2016, while the song also became the second-newest holiday track to reach the Hot 100's top ten (after Ariana Grande's "Santa Tell Me").

Internationally, "Underneath the Tree" charted in various countries, including Austria, Canada, Germany, Ireland, the Netherlands, and the United Kingdom. In Canada, it debuted at number 41 on the Billboard Canadian Hot 100 in December 2013, before charting at number seven in December 2024. In the UK, it entered the UK singles chart at number 79 for the week ending December 14, 2013, before re-charting in 2022, 2023, and 2024, rising at number ten in 2024, becoming Clarkson tenth top-ten song. The song has sold over 318,000 units and has been streamed over 26 million times in the UK as of 2019. In Ireland the song entered at number 37 in January 2020, before eventually charting at number 15 in December 2021. The song also debuted at number 54 on the Australian ARIA Singles Chart in December 2019, before eventually reaching number nine in January 2024.

In Austria, it debuted at number 68 on the Ö3 Austria Top 40 in 2014 and later peaked at number eight. In the Netherlands, it entered the Dutch Top 40 chat at number 26 before rising to number 25 the following week in January 2013. In Japan, "Underneath the Tree" debuted on the Billboard Japan Hot 100 chart at number 84 for the week ending January 4, 2014, and spent two weeks on the chart. In Germany, it opened at number 43 in December 2018, before eventually ascending to number five in December 2024. In Switzerland, it debuted at number 73 in December 2017, before reaching climbing to number ten in December 2023.

== Music video ==
On the eve of Wrapped in Red's release, RCA Records released an animated lyric video for "Underneath the Tree", featuring shots of ice skating, a snow-covered town, and copious Christmas trees. The lyric video was released to positive reviews, with Idolator's Sam Lansky describing it as "a nice visual accompaniment to the song that just lends an extra high-octane Yuletide cheer to its already-effervescent spirit". Hamish Hamilton directed the official music video, which premiered on December 3, 2013, on Vevo and featured a live performance of the song from the stage of Clarkson's NBC television special, Kelly Clarkson's Cautionary Christmas Music Tale.

== Live performances ==
Clarkson has performed "Underneath the Tree" in various televised performances. She first performed "Underneath the Tree" in a live televised performance on The Today Show on November 26, 2013. Apart from being performed from the set of Kelly Clarkson's Cautionary Christmas Music Tale featured in the song's accompanying music video, a different live performance was aired during the television special itself, in which Clarkson was accompanied by children while singing it. She also performed the song on the fifth season of the American singing competition The Voice on December 3, 2013. On December 5, 2013, she then performed it on The Ellen DeGeneres Show and on Late Night with Jimmy Fallon. In 2016 Clarkson performed the track on The Wonderful World of Disney: Magical Holiday Celebration television special at the Walt Disney World resort, and the recording was used on the holiday comedy film Office Christmas Party. In December 2019, Clarkson recorded a performance of the song on her talk show, The Kelly Clarkson Show, as part of its "Kellyoke" segment.

== Impact ==
Brian Mansfield of USA Today reported that "Underneath the Tree" was American radio's most-played new holiday song of 2013. In a report published by ASCAP, "Underneath the Tree" was listed as the most-performed new and original holiday song in their repertoire in the years 2015, 2018, and 2019. Marketing curator PlayNetwork also reported that the track was one of the only newer original songs heard by holiday shoppers in 2015. In a 2017 op-ed piece by Pitchfork contributor Grayson Haver Currin on guitarist John Fahey's Christmas music, he sampled the song as a "new Christmas classic" along with "All I Want for Christmas Is You". In an interview on Vogue, Genius content director Elizabeth Milch referred to the song as "the most recent thing to make a play for the "All I Want" crown", while The Washington Post writer Allison Stewart also described it as a close cousin to "All I Want for Christmas is You". In a 2019 Mediabase report by The Atlanta Journal-Constitution, "Underneath the Tree" is the only new song from the past 20 years in their most played top 50 Christmas songs, as most of the tracks that are being played are from the 1940s to 1960s.

In a retrospective listing of the best holiday songs from each year since 1967, Billboard editors chose "Underneath the Tree" as the best holiday song of 2013. Announcing the return of their 2019 Holiday 100 chart, Billboard reported that the track is the only one that was released in the 21st century to appear inside the top twenty. In a 2019 data analysis by Quartz reporter Dan Kopf, he remarked that the song might be a successor to "All I Want for Christmas is You" based on its chart performance. Various publications also promulgated "Underneath the Tree" in their best Christmas songs lists throughout the years:

- 1st – Billboard, Best New Christmas Songs of the 21st Century
- 1st – Bustle, 16 Christmas Pop Songs That Totally Sleigh
- 1st – Cosmopolitan, 17 Christmas Pop Songs That are Total Bops
- 1st – Metro, Best Christmas Pop Songs of the 2010s
- 1st – Slant Magazine, The 21 Best Christmas Songs of the 21st Century
- 2nd – The Varsity, 10 Songs that Need to be on Your Holiday Playlist
- 3rd – The Washington Post, A ranking of 100 Christmas songs
- 7th – O, The Oprah Magazine, 50 Best Christmas Songs of All Time
- 9th – Redbook, The 50 Best Christmas Songs of All Time
- 18th – Men's Health, The 25 Best Christmas Pop Songs of All Time
- 23rd – Good Housekeeping, 40 Best Modern Christmas Songs
- 29th – Time Out, The 65 Best Christmas songs ofAll Time
- 33rd – Country Living, 60 Best Christmas Songs of All Time
- 55th – Cosmopolitan, The 75 Best Christmas Songs of All Time

== Track listing ==
Digital download – Single
No.	Title	Length
1.	"Underneath the Tree"	3:49

Digital download – Remixes EP
No.	Title	Length
1.	"Underneath the Tree" (Cutmore Christmas Sleigh Ride Radio Mix)	3:56
2.	"Underneath the Tree" (Cutmore Christmas Sleigh Ride Extended Mix)	6:23
3.	"Underneath the Tree" (Cutmore Christmas Sleigh Ride PA Mix)	3:55
4.	"Underneath the Tree" (Cutmore Christmas Sleigh Ride Dub)	6:22
5.	"Underneath the Tree" (Morlando Radio Mix)	3:47
6.	"Underneath the Tree" (Morlando Remix)	5:41

4" Vinyl – single
No.	Title	Length
1.	"Underneath the Tree"	3:49
2.	"Run Run Rudolph"	2:27

== Credits and personnel ==
Credits adapted from the Wrapped in Red liner notes.

Recording

- Produced at Echo Recording Studio, Los Angeles, California

Personnel

- All vocals – Kelly Clarkson
- Engineering – Jesse Shatkin
- Bass guitar, drums, engineering, guitar, horn arrangements, keyboards, production and programming – Greg Kurstin
- Mixing – Serban Ghenea
  - Engineered for mixing – John Hanes
- Flugelhorn, mellophone, saxophones (tenor, baritone), trombone, trumpet – David Ralicke

== Charts ==
=== Weekly charts ===
Chart performance for "Underneath the Tree"
Chart (2013–2026)	Peak position
Australia (ARIA)	6
Austria (Ö3 Austria Top 40)	6
Belarus Airplay (TopHit)	59
Belgium (Ultratop 50 Flanders)	13
Belgium (Ultratop 50 Wallonia)	21
Canada Hot 100 (Billboard)	6
Canada AC (Billboard)	1
Canada Hot AC (Billboard)	41
CIS Airplay (TopHit)	130
Croatia (Billboard)	14
Czech Republic Singles Digital (ČNS IFPI)	15
Denmark (Tracklisten)	27
Estonia Airplay (TopHit)	40
Finland (Suomen virallinen lista)	15
France (SNEP)	22
Germany (GfK)	5
Global 200 (Billboard)	6
Greece International (IFPI)	9
Hungary (Rádiós Top 40)	25
Hungary (Single Top 40)	7
Hungary (Stream Top 40)	7
Ireland (IRMA)	7
Italy (FIMI)	18
Japan Hot 100 (Billboard)	84
Latvia Streaming (LaIPA)	7
Lithuania (AGATA)	8
Luxembourg (Billboard)	9
Moldova Airplay (TopHit)	37
Netherlands (Dutch Top 40)	25
Netherlands (Mega Top 50)	34
Netherlands (Single Top 100)	4
New Zealand (Recorded Music NZ)	6
Norway (IFPI Norge)	26
Philippines Hot 100 (Billboard Philippines)	38
Poland Airplay (ZPAV)	91
Poland (Polish Streaming Top 100)	12
Portugal (AFP)	8
Romania Airplay (TopHit)	108
Scottish Singles Sales (Official Charts)	24
Singapore (RIAS)	10
Slovakia Singles Digital (ČNS IFPI)	16
South Africa Streaming (TOSAC)	54
South Korea (Circle)	33
Spain (PROMUSICAE)	32
Sweden (Sverigetopplistan)	34
Switzerland (Schweizer Hitparade)	8
United Arab Emirates (IFPI)	14
UK Singles (Official Charts)	5
US Billboard Hot 100	7
US Adult Contemporary (Billboard)	1
US Adult Pop Airplay (Billboard)	34
US Holiday 100 (Billboard)	6
US Rolling Stone Top 100	11

=== Monthly charts ===
Monthly chart performance for "Underneath the Tree"
Chart (2023–2025)	Peak position
Lithuania Airplay (TopHit)	45
Moldova Airplay (TopHit)	61

=== Year-end charts ===
2013 year-end chart performance for "Underneath the Tree"
Chart (2013)	Position
South Korea International (Gaon)	113

2014 year-end chart performance for "Underneath the Tree"
Chart (2014)	Position
Netherlands (Dutch Top 40)	161
US Adult Contemporary (Billboard)	43

2020 year-end chart performance for "Underneath the Tree"
Chart (2020)	Position
Hungary (Stream Top 40)	85

2023 year-end chart performance for "Underneath the Tree"
Chart (2023)	Position
Hungary (Single Top 40)	62
US Streaming Songs (Billboard)	69

2024 year-end chart performance for "Underneath the Tree"
Chart (2024)	Position
Austria (Ö3 Austria Top 40)	60
Germany (GfK)	93

2025 year-end chart performance for "Underneath the Tree"
Chart (2025)	Position
Germany (GfK)	88

=== Decade-end charts ===
20s Decade-end chart performance
Chart (2025–2026)	Position
Russia Streaming (TopHit)	162

== Certifications ==
Region	Certification	Certified units/sales
Australia (ARIA)	2× Platinum	140,000^{‡}
Denmark (IFPI Danmark)	2× Platinum	180,000^{‡}
Germany (BVMI)	Platinum	300,000^{‡}
Italy (FIMI)	Gold	50,000^{‡}
New Zealand (RMNZ)	Platinum	30,000^{‡}
Norway (IFPI Norway)	Gold	30,000^{‡}
Portugal (AFP)	Platinum	25,000^{‡}
Spain (Promusicae)	Gold	30,000^{‡}
United Kingdom (BPI)	4× Platinum	2,400,000^{‡}
Streaming
Greece (IFPI Greece)	Platinum	2,000,000^{†}
^{‡} Sales+streaming figures based on certification alone.^{†} Streaming-only figures based on certification alone.

== Radio and release history ==
List of release dates, showing region, release format, label, and catalog number
Region	Date	Format	Label	Catalog number	Ref.
United States	November 5, 2013	Adult Contemporary radio	RCA	—N/a	
United Kingdom	November 22, 2013	Digital download – Single	RCA	GBCTA1300103	
United States	December 9, 2013	Digital download – Single	RCA	GBCTA1300103	
Australia	December 17, 2013	Digital download – Remixes EP	Sony Music	886444405676	
Austria	December 17, 2013	Digital download – Remixes EP	Columbia	886444405676	
Germany	December 17, 2013	Digital download – Remixes EP	Columbia	886444405676	
United Kingdom	December 17, 2013	Digital download – Remixes EP	RCA	886444405676	
United States	December 17, 2013	Digital download – Remixes EP	RCA	886444405676	
United States	October 23, 2026	4" vinyl	Legacy	199584765518	

== See also ==
- List of Christmas hit singles in the United Kingdom
- List of Christmas hit singles in the United States
- List of U.S. number-one adult contemporary singles of 2013 and 2014
- List of Billboard Global 200 top-ten singles in 2023
- List of Billboard Hot 100 top-ten singles in 2024
- List of UK top-ten singles in 2024
- List of top 10 singles for 2024 in Australia
