= Wrapped in Red (song) =

Single by Kelly Clarkson

from the album Wrapped in Red
- Released: November 25, 2014
- Recorded: 2013
- Studio: Echo Recording Studio, Los Angeles, California
- Genre: Soul; pop
- Length: 3:36
- Label: RCA
- Songwriters: Kelly Clarkson; Ashley Arrison; Aben Eubanks; Shane McAnally
- Producer: Greg Kurstin

Kelly Clarkson singles chronology
"PrizeFighter" (2014)	"Wrapped in Red" (2014)	"Heartbeat Song" (2015)

Music video
- "Wrapped in Red" on YouTube

"Wrapped in Red" is a song by American singer Kelly Clarkson. It is the titular song and the opening track from her sixth studio album and debut Christmas album of the same name (2013). Written by Clarkson, Ashley Arrison, Aben Eubanks, and Shane McAnally, the song is produced by Greg Kurstin, who recorded the track using the Wall of Sound production technique developed by Phil Spector. A soul-pop ballad, "Wrapped in Red" is a Christmas song about unrequited love in the holidays, in which the color red is used as metaphorical device to express someone's truthful feelings, apart from being a quintessential holiday color. "Wrapped in Red" was serviced by RCA Records to Adult Contemporary radio stations as the second single from the album on November 25, 2014.

Lauded for its homage to production sound and vocal performance, "Wrapped in Red" was met with a positive reception from music critics, who regarded it a candidate to be a future holiday classic along with "Underneath the Tree". Boosted by digital sales and radio support following the album's release, the song charted in two Billboard music charts as an album cut.

== Writing and composition ==
"Wrapped in Red"
In this 27-second sample of the song, Clarkson sings of being "wrapped in red". A quintessential holiday pigment, the emotions associated with the color red sets the album's overall theme.

After releasing her first greatest hits album, Greatest Hits – Chapter One, in November 2012, Clarkson was approached by her record label, RCA Records, about recording a Christmas album. During that holiday season, she began to write original material for it to avoid writing during the off-season of summer. Written by Clarkson, Ashley Arrison, Aben Eubanks and Shane McAnally, "Wrapped in Red" is a soul-pop Christmas ballad. It is one of the five original songs recorded for the album; the other four being "Underneath the Tree", "Every Christmas", "Winter Dreams (Brandon's Song)" and "4 Carats", all of which are produced by Greg Kurstin. She revealed that its lyrical content was inspired by a scene in the holiday feature film Love Actually (2003), in which one of its characters, Mark (played by Andrew Lincoln) confesses his unrequited love towards Juliet (played by Keira Knightley). The Guardian's Caroline Sullivan described it as Clarkson mustering the courage to "risk it all" with someone who may well reject her. The title is derived from being swaddled in the color red, which, apart from being a prominent color associated with Christmas, also expresses an multitude of emotions, such as love, pain, and beauty.

During the song's recording, Kurstin used Phil Spector's Wall of Sound treatments apart from adding sleigh bells to resonate a holiday Memphis soul sound, Several music critics compared its sound to the music popularized by girl groups throughout the 1960s, and singled the track out as the one that resonates the treatment most throughout the album.

== Critical response ==
"Wrapped in Red" has received a positive response from music critics, who praised its homage to the famous Wall of Sound technique and Clarkson's vocal performance. They also considered it as a candidate to be a future holiday classic. Jon Sobel of the Seattle Post-Intelligencer hailed it as one of the two strongest tracks on the album to have a potential for lasting popularity (the other one being "Underneath the Tree") and described it as the one that showcases the emotional power of Clarkson's singing ability the most. Sal Cinquemani of Slant Magazine described it as "retro" and a welcome addition to shopping-mall playlists. Lisa-Marie Ferla of The Arts Desk described the track as a perfect mix of sleigh bells, love-struck festive clichés and soaring choruses to produce something that could have been written for the Love Actually soundtrack. Crosswalk.com's Christa Banister praised the song's homage to Spector's Wall of Sound as bright and fantastic. Sarah Rodman of The Boston Globe described it as a sparkly treat, with a nice melancholy undertone familiar to anyone who knows the holiday blues. In his review of the album, Jon Caramanica of The New York Times described the song as the right combination of vintage and fresh and regarded it as the closest Clarkson can come as the only pop artist with a possibility to create a modern holiday classic along the lines of Mariah Carey's "All I Want for Christmas Is You" (1994).

== Chart performance ==
On the week ending November 16, 2013, "Wrapped in Red" entered the Billboard Holiday Digital Songs chart as an album cut at number five where it spent two weeks on the chart. On the week ending December 28, 2013, it debuted on the Billboard Canada AC chart at number 22 before ascending to number 10 a week after. It also entered the Gaon Singles Chart in South Korea at number 43 on the week ending November 23, 2013. Following its release as a single, "Wrapped in Red" debuted on the Billboard Adult Contemporary chart at number 11 on the week ending December 13, 2014, before rising to the No. 2 spot the following week.

== Music video ==
The accompanying music video for "Wrapped in Red" was directed by Weiss Eubanks in Nashville, Tennessee on October 6, 2014. It premiered on Amazon.com on November 25, 2014. Presented in a vintage-looking tone, the video features various footage from Clarkson's Christmas past, interspersed with scenes of Clarkson performing the song against three backgrounds—white, dark, and red—symbolizing some the colors and atmosphere represented in the song.

== Track listing ==
Digital download – Single
No.	Title	Length
1.	"Wrapped in Red"	3:36

Digital download – Ruff Loaderz Remix – Single
No.	Title	Length
1.	"Wrapped in Red" (Ruff Loaderz Radio Mix)	3:37
2.	"Wrapped in Red" (Ruff Loaderz Extended Mix)	6:33

== Credits and personnel ==
Credits adapted from the Wrapped in Red liner notes.

Personnel

- All vocals – Kelly Clarkson
- Engineering – Jesse Shatkin, Alex Pasco
- Bass, engineering, guitar, keyboards, record production, and programming – Greg Kurstin
- Mixing – Serban Ghenea
  - Engineered for mixing – John Hanes
- Songwriting – Kelly Clarkson, Ashley Arrison, Aben Eubanks, Shane McAnally

== Charts ==
Weekly chart performance for "Wrapped in Red"
Chart (2013–15)	Peak position
Belgium (Ultratip Bubbling Under Flanders)	56
Canada AC (Billboard)	10
South Korea International Singles (GAON)	43
US Adult Contemporary (Billboard)	2
US Holiday Digital Songs (Billboard)	5

== Radio and release history ==
List of release dates, showing region, release format, and label
Region	Date	Format	Label
United States	November 25, 2014	Adult Contemporary radio	RCA Records
Netherlands	December 1, 2014	Digital download – Single	Sony Music Entertainment
Germany	December 8, 2014	Digital download – Ruff Loaderz Remix – Single	Sony Music Entertainment
United Kingdom	December 8, 2014	Digital download – Ruff Loaderz Remix – Single	RCA Records
United States	December 8, 2014	Digital download – Ruff Loaderz Remix – Single	RCA Records
United Kingdom	December 15, 2014	Digital download – Single	RCA Records
