= Whitney Wolanin =

American singer and songwriter (born 1990)

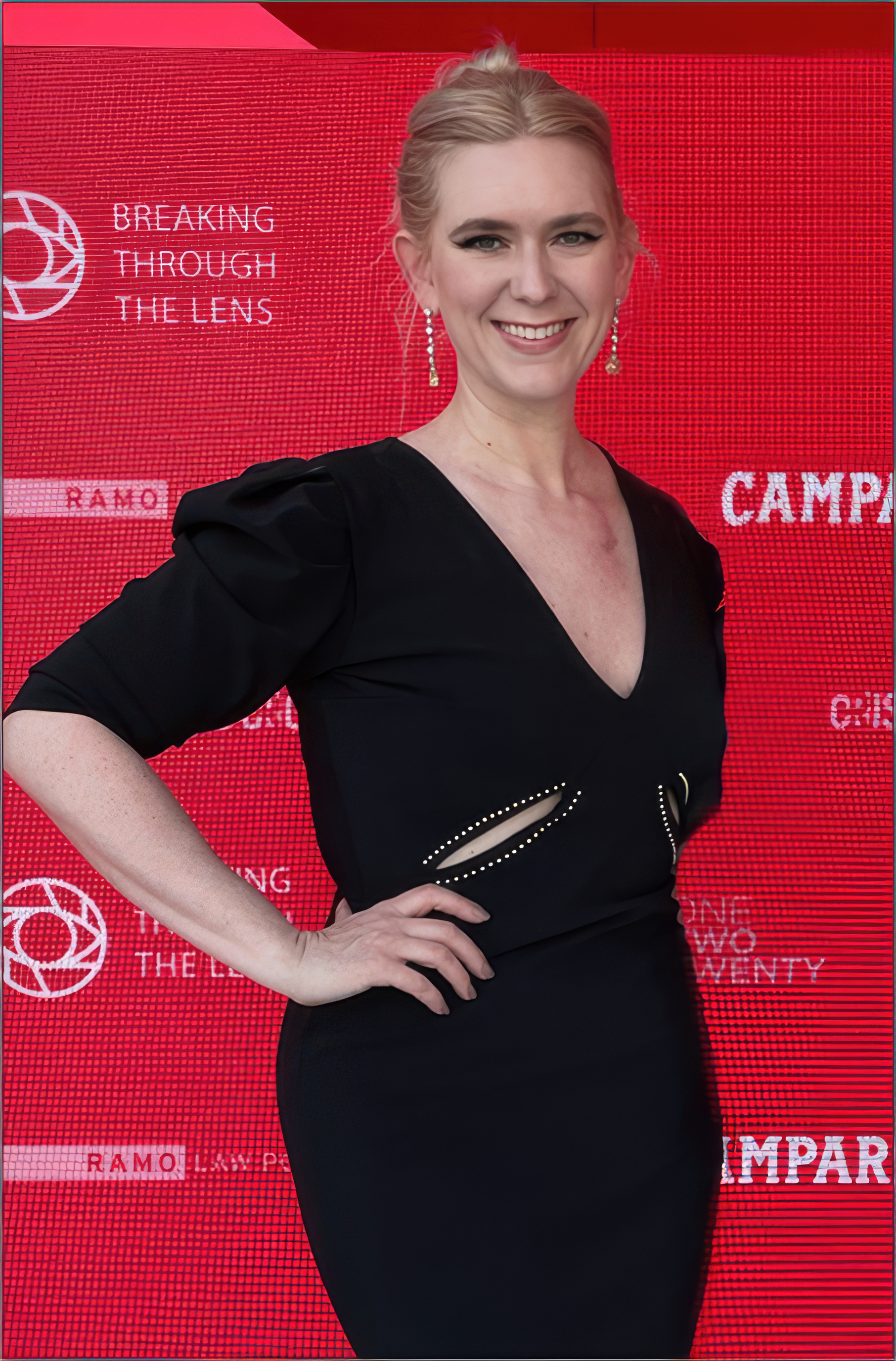
- Wolanin at Cannes Film Festival
- Born: Whitney Margaret Wolanin; June 29, 1990 (age 36); Albany, New York, United States
- Education: Vanderbilt University (BA); Le Cordon Bleu
- Occupations: Director, Producer, Recording Artist
- Website: Official website

Whitney Wolanin (/woʊˈlænɪn/; born June 29, 1990) is an American director, producer, and recording artist. Born in Albany, New York and raised in southwest Florida, she began her recording career in 2004 through sessions with Funk Brothers bassist Bob Babbitt. After multiple releases in the 2010s, Wolanin shifted her focus to producing and directing commercials and music videos, most notably producing Tyler Childers’ Grammy-nominated video In Your Love.

== Early life and education ==
Whitney Wolanin was born on June 29, 1990, in Albany, New York. Her mother, Illona Wolanin, is a retired teacher and her father, Vincent Wolanin, is a businessman from Philadelphia. Shortly after her birth, the family moved to Lee County, Florida, where she attended Fort Myers High School.

In 2011, Wolanin received a B.S. from Vanderbilt University. She majored in Human and Organizational development and studied voice at the Blair school of music. During her time at Vanderbilt, Wolanin was a member of the improv comedy group Tongue-N-Cheek, as well as Vanderbilt Off-Broadway, appearing in their production of Nine. Wolanin also holds a Diplôme de Cuisine from Le Cordon Bleu, London.

== Career ==
In 2004, Wolanin began a collaboration with Bob Babbitt titled Funkology XIII. The album released July 12, 2005, and included two singles, "Good" and "It Takes Two", the latter featuring Jimi Jamison of Survivor. A holiday counterpart to the album, Christmasology, was released the following year.

Wolanin's follow-up single, "Loud and Clear" (2007), received airplay on dance and club radio and was also featured in an episode of The Hills. In 2012, “Honesty" became Wolanin's first original single to chart at AC radio. Later that year, Wolanin released her third EP, Let's Be Honest Part 1, as well as recording a version of "Frosty the Snowman" that would go on to reach No. 13 on Billboard's AC chart. The following year, she released "Wrong Guy (I Did It This Time)", as well as Christmas single "Run, Run Rudolph", which charted at No. 2. Wolanin would go on to release three further singles: "Forever", "Silver Bells", and "Never Said No".

After taking a hiatus from music, Wolanin shifted her focus to film and produced The Reenactment, an independent horror film starring Tony Todd, James Storm, and Megan Duffy. Wolanin has also directed music videos for Joy Oladokun, Alee, and The Frontmen, as commercials for Lifetime and L’Oreal. In 2023, Wolanin was nominated for a Grammy as a producer on Tyler Childers’ In Your Love music video.

== Discography ==
- Funkology XIII (2005, TopNotch)
- "Christmas (The Warmest Time of the Year)" single (2005, TopNotch)
- Christmasology (2006, TopNotch)
- "Loud and Clear" single (2007, TopNotch)
- Girl EP (2009, TopNotch)
- 1 EP (2011, TopNotch)
- Let's Be Honest, Pt. 1 EP (2012, TopNotch)
- "Wrong Guy (I Did It This Time)" single (2013, TopNotch)
- "Run, Run Rudolph" Mini Album (2013, TopNotch)
- "Forever" single (2014, TopNotch)
- "Never Said No" Single (2016, TopNotch)
- Aside Album (2022, TopNotch)
