= Run Rudolph Run =

1958 Christmas song written and recorded by Chuck Berry

Single by Chuck Berry
- A-side: "Merry Christmas Baby"
- Released: 19 Nov 1958
- Recorded: 1958
- Studio: Chess (Chicago)
- Genre: Christmas, rock and roll
- Length: 2:46
- Label: Chess 1714
- Songwriters: Chuck Berry Music (credited on original single label); Johnny Marks (subsequent); Marvin Brodie
- Producers: Leonard Chess, Phil Chess

"Run Rudolph Run" is a Christmas song written by Chuck Berry but credited to Johnny Marks and M. Brodie due to Marks's trademark on the character of Rudolph the Red-Nosed Reindeer. (Note: There is some debate about authorship. The original record credited authorship to Berry's music company (Chuck Berry Music, Inc.) and Brodie. Only in subsequent releases did the writing credits go to Marks and Brodie (and even then, this was not always the case, as multiple later releases by the label credited the song simply to Berry). Marks was the songwriter of the thematically similar, but musically different, song "Rudolph, the Red-Nosed Reindeer". All cover versions of "Run Rudolph Run" by other artists have since credited the song to Marks and Brodie (as published by Marks's St. Nicholas Music (ASCAP)). Berry's song "Little Queenie" - recorded during the same session as "Run Rudolph Run", and which was musically similar to, but lyrically different from, "Run Rudolph Run" - was released shortly after "Run Rudolph Run", in 1959. In it, the song never listed Marks or Brodie as a songwriter, only Berry's music company or Berry himself.) It was published by St. Nicholas Music (ASCAP) and was first recorded by Berry in 1958, released as a single on Chess Records.

It has since been covered by numerous other artists, sometimes with the title "Run Run Rudolph".

== History ==
Chuck Berry reported that he wrote the song himself, but then discovered that the name Rudolph was trademarked by Johnny Marks. Marks sued and consequently was given songwriting credit, although he "had nothing to do with the song." Berry also said that M. Brodie does not exist, but was a pseudonym created as "a scheme to make more money for Marks and his publisher." Berry's 1958 45-rpm single gives writing credits to "C. Berry Music – M. Brodie". All subsequent cover versions of the song are credited to Marks and Brodie, as published by Marks's St. Nicholas Music (ASCAP).

The song's dialogue between Santa and the children references popular toys of the 1950s.

== Cover versions ==
- Keith Richards released a cover of the song in 1978.
- It was covered in 2006 by Dr. Teeth and the Electric Mayhem.
- In 2007, Sister Hazel covered the song on their Christmas cover album Santa’s Playlist.
- The song was included in the 2008 compilation album We Wish You a Metal Xmas and a Headbanging New Year where it was covered by Lemmy, Billy Gibbons and Dave Grohl.
- It was covered by Whitney Wolanin in 2013. Her recording reached the highest chart position of all versions on Billboard, reaching number two on its Adult Contemporary chart. Wolanin starred in a parody music film with the song about the original movie A Christmas Story at the Christmas Story House.
- Foo Fighters released the song as a promotional single in 2020.
- In 2023, Cher recorded a cover of the song for her Christmas album Christmas. In 2025, she performed it live on Saturday Night Live with Captain Kirk Douglas from the Roots on guitar and the Saturday Night Live Band.
- In 2025, Pentatonix covered the song as a mashup with Glenn Miller's "In the Mood" entitled "Moody Rudy" for their Christmas album Christmas in the City.

== Chart performance ==
During its initial chart run, Berry's 1958 recording peaked at number 69 on the Billboard Hot 100 chart in December 1958. Sixty years later, the single re-entered the Hot 100 chart at number 45 (on the week ending January 5, 2019), reaching an overall peak position of number 10 on the week ending January 2, 2021, following its third chart re-entry, becoming Berry's third top-ten hit and his first since 1972's "My Ding-a-Ling". In doing so, it broke the record for the longest climb to the top 10 since its first entry in December 1958, at 62 years and two weeks.

Berry's original version first made the UK Singles Chart on the week ending Christmas Day 1963, peaking at number 36 two weeks later (with the song's title misspelled as "Run Rudolf Run").

Bryan Adams recorded a version for A Very Special Christmas, a 1987 compilation album produced to benefit the Special Olympics.

In 2013, Whitney Wolanin released a version of the song that reached number two on the Billboard Adult Contemporary chart. The only other recordings that charted in the U.S. were by the country music artists Luke Bryan, whose 2008 rendition peaked at number 42 on the Hot Country Songs chart, Justin Moore, whose 2011 version peaked at number 58 on the Hot Country Songs chart, and the pop music artist Mark Ambor, whose 2024 rendition peaked at number 78 on the Billboard Hot 100 chart.

=== Chuck Berry ===
Chart (1958)	Peak position
US Billboard Hot 100	69

Chart (2018–2026)	Peak position
Australia (ARIA)	22
Austria (Ö3 Austria Top 40)	57
Canada Hot 100 (Billboard)	22
France (SNEP)	172
Global 200 (Billboard)	22
Greece International (IFPI)	28
Ireland (IRMA)	41
Latvia (DigiTop100)	39
Lithuania (AGATA)	41
Netherlands (Single Top 100)	76
New Zealand (Recorded Music NZ)	28
Portugal (AFP)	84
Slovakia Airplay (ČNS IFPI)	78
Slovakia Singles Digital (ČNS IFPI)	78
Sweden Heatseeker (Sverigetopplistan)	1
Switzerland (Schweizer Hitparade)	39
UK Singles (Official Charts)	36
US Billboard Hot 100	10
US Holiday 100 (Billboard)	9
US Rolling Stone Top 100	5

=== Keith Richards ===
Chart (2018)	Peak position
UK Vinyl Albums Chart (OCC)	34

=== Whitney Wolanin ===
Chart (2013)	Peak position
US Adult Contemporary (Billboard)	2

=== Luke Bryan ===
Chart (2008–09)	Peak position
US Hot Country Songs (Billboard)	42

=== Justin Moore ===
Chart (2012)	Peak position
US Hot Country Songs (Billboard)	58

=== Mark Ambor ===
Chart (2024–2025)	Peak position
Australia (ARIA)	36
Canada Hot 100 (Billboard)	56
Greece International (IFPI)	67
Ireland (IRMA)	9
Lithuania (AGATA)	33
Netherlands (Single Top 100)	96
New Zealand (Recorded Music NZ)	36
UK Singles (Official Charts)	31
US Billboard Hot 100	78

== Certifications ==
Region	Certification	Certified units/sales
New Zealand (RMNZ)	Platinum	30,000^{‡}
United Kingdom (BPI)	Platinum	600,000^{‡}
United States (RIAA)	Platinum	1,000,000^{‡}
Streaming
Greece (IFPI Greece)	Platinum	2,000,000^{†}
^{‡} Sales+streaming figures based on certification alone.^{†} Streaming-only figures based on certification alone.
