= Pentatonix discography =

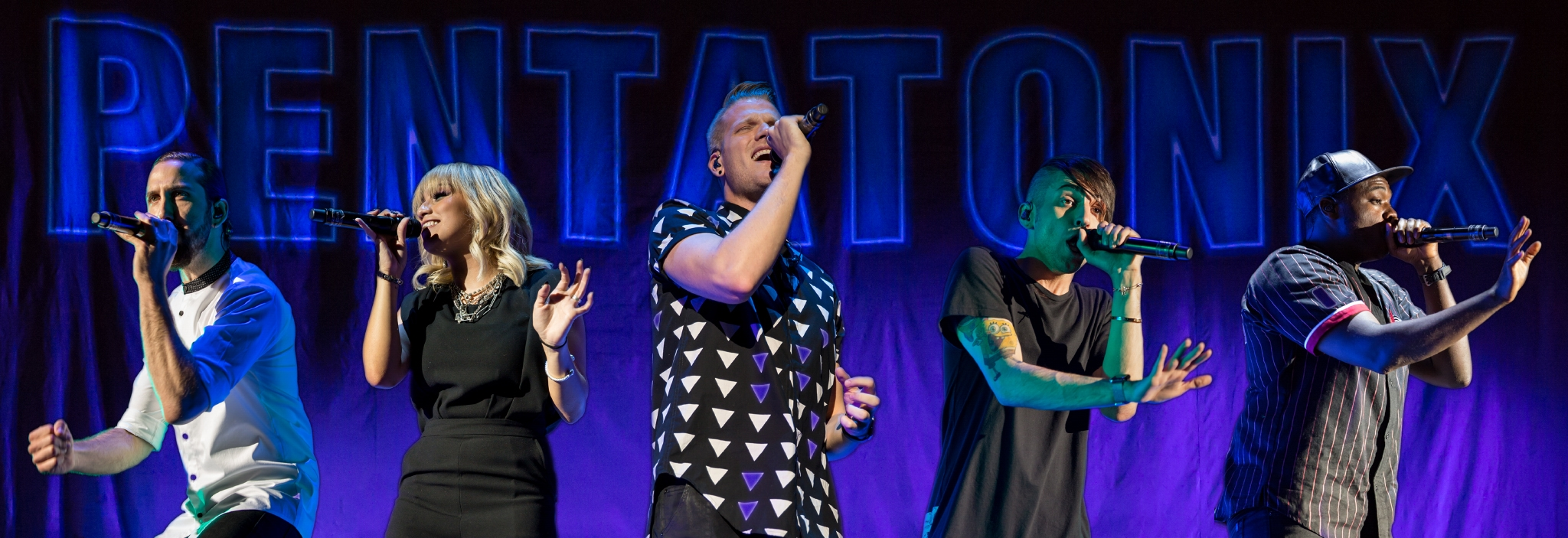
- Pentatonix performing in Texas at the Austin360 Amphitheater, in 2015.
- Studio albums: 12
- EPs: 6
- Compilation albums: 6
- Singles: 34
- Music videos: 58

American a cappella group Pentatonix (PTX) has released 12 studio albums, six compilation albums, six extended plays (EPs), 34 singles and 58 music videos. The group won the third season of The Sing-Off in 2011, and subsequently received a recording contract with Sony. In June 2012, Pentatonix released their first extended play, PTX, Volume 1 through Sony-owned independent record label Madison Gate Records. The EP debuted at number 14 on the US Billboard 200, selling 18,401 copies in its first week of sales. A Christmas EP, PTXmas, was released in November 2012. It was re-released in November 2013 with one of its new tracks, "Little Drummer Boy", debuting at number 13 on the US Billboard Hot 100 and charting in other countries such as Austria, Canada and New Zealand. The EP became the sixth highest-selling Christmas album of 2013, selling over 168,000 copies. In November 2013, Pentatonix released their third EP, PTX, Vol. II which debuted at number 10 on the Billboard 200, selling 31,000 copies in its first week of sales.

In May 2014, Pentatonix signed with RCA Records, a "flagship" label of Sony, releasing their debut studio album, PTX, Vols. 1 & 2 in July 2014. It contained all of the songs from their two namesake EPs and four additional tracks, previously released as singles. A fourth EP, PTX, Vol. III, was released in September 2014.

The group's second full-length Christmas album, That's Christmas to Me was released on October 21, 2014 and peaked at number 2 on the Billboard 200. A single from the album, the group's cover of "Mary, Did You Know?", both debuted and peaked on the Billboard Hot 100 at number 26. In December 2014, That's Christmas to Me was certified gold by the Recording Industry Association of America and became the group's first accredited release in the US, having sold 1,620,000 in the US as of December 2015. Pentatonix became the first act to top both the "Holiday Albums" and "Holiday Songs" charts simultaneously since the Holiday 100 launched as a multi-metric tabulation in December 2011. The album is also the highest charting holiday album by a group since 1962. In 2016, Pentatonix released another Christmas album, A Pentatonix Christmas and it marked as Pentatonix's second number 1 album on the Billboard 200.

As of July 2017, Pentatonix has sold 4.9 million albums in total in the United States.

== Albums ==
=== Studio albums ===
Title	Album details	Peak chart positions											Sales	Certifications
Title	Album details	US	US Hol.	AUS	AUT	CAN	GER	JPN	NL	NZ	SWI	UK	Sales	Certifications
PTX, Vols. 1 & 2	Released: July 30, 2014 (JPN); Label: RCA; Formats: CD, digital download	—	—	63	—	—	—	6	—	—	—	—		
PTX	Released: September 19, 2014; Label: RCA; Formats: CD, digital download	—	—	—	20	—	34	—	—	—	27	—		
That's Christmas to Me	Released: October 21, 2014; Label: RCA; Formats: CD, digital download, LP	2	1	21	11	4	53	18	37	23	63	79	US: 2,203,000; CAN: 45,000	RIAA: 2× Platinum; ARIA: Gold; BPI: Silver; IFPI AUT: Gold; MC: Platinum; RMNZ: Gold
Pentatonix	Released: October 16, 2015; Label: RCA; Formats: CD, digital download, LP	1	—	5	14	7	38	13	14	8	24	18	US: 517,000	RIAA: Gold; MC: Gold
A Pentatonix Christmas	Released: October 21, 2016; Label: RCA; Formats: CD, LP, digital download	1	1	16	4	1	13	47	13	18	15	73	World: 2,000,000; US: 1,335,000	RIAA: Platinum; BVMI: Gold; IFPI AUT: Gold; MC: 2× Platinum; RMNZ: Gold
PTX Presents: Top Pop, Vol. I	Released: April 13, 2018; Label: RCA; Formats: CD, LP, digital download	10	—	26	8	15	35	33	23	30	19	76	US: 30,000	
Christmas Is Here!	Released: October 26, 2018; Label: RCA; Formats: CD, LP, digital download	7	1	100	27	18	—	94	—	—	—	— (Note: Christmas Is Here! did not enter the UK Top 100 Albums Chart, but peaked at number 90 on the UK Albums Downloads chart.)		
We Need a Little Christmas	Released: November 13, 2020; Label: RCA; Formats: CD, digital download	23	4	64	29	46	—	75	—	—	—	— (Note: We Need a Little Christmas did not enter the UK Top 100 Albums Chart, but peaked at number 39 on the UK Albums Downloads chart.)		
The Lucky Ones	Released: February 12, 2021; Label: RCA; Formats: CD, digital download	123	—	—	—	—	—	81	—	—	36	— (Note: The Lucky Ones did not enter the UK Top 100 Albums Chart, but peaked at number 71 on the UK Albums Sales chart.)		
Evergreen	Released: October 29, 2021; Label: RCA; Formats: CD, digital download	72	3	—	—	—	—	150	—	—	—	— (Note: Evergreen did not enter the UK Top 100 Albums Chart, but peaked at number 63 on the UK Albums Downloads chart.)		
Holidays Around the World	Released: October 28, 2022; Label: RCA; Formats: CD, digital download	142	6	—	—	—	—	—	—	—	—	—	US: 28,000	
Christmas in the City	Released: October 24, 2025; Label: Republic; Formats: CD, digital download	— (Note: Christmas in the City did not enter the Billboard 200 but did peak at number 28 on the Top Album Sales chart.)	6	—	—	—	—	—	—	—	—	—		
"—" denotes a recording that did not chart or was not released in that territory.

=== Compilation albums ===
Title	Album details	Peak chart positions								
Title	Album details	US	US Hol.	AUS	AUT	CAN	JPN	NL	SWI	UK
Vols. I–III	Released: August 13, 2016; Label: RCA; Formats: Vinyl box set	—	—	—	—	—	33	—	—	—
That's Christmas to Me/PTXmas: Deluxe	Released: October 28, 2017; Label: RCA, Legacy; Formats: CD	64	8	—	—	—	—	—	—	—
The Best of Pentatonix Christmas	Released: October 25, 2019; Label: RCA; Formats: CD, digital download, streaming	7	1	25	17	21	85	55	56	81
PTX Japan 5th Anniversary Greatest Hits	Released: November 13, 2019; Label: RCA; Formats: CD, digital download, streaming	—	—	—	—	—	33	—	—	—
White Christmas	Released: November 19, 2021; Label: RCA; Formats: Digital download	—	—	—	—	—	33	—	—	—
The Greatest Christmas Hits	Released: October 20, 2023; Label: RCA; Formats: CD, digital download, streaming	10	3	—	55	11	—	—	86	64

== Extended plays ==
Title	EP details	Peak chart positions										Sales
Title	EP details	US	AUS	AUT	CAN	DEN	FIN	FRA	ITA	NZ	UK	Sales
PTX, Volume 1	Released: June 26, 2012; Label: Madison Gate, RCA (reissue); Formats: CD, digital download, streaming	14	—	—	—	—	—	19	—	—	—	
PTXmas	Released: November 13, 2012; Label: Madison Gate, RCA (reissue); Formats: CD, digital download, LP	7	78	36	49	—	—	—	—	35	— (Note: PTXmas did not enter the UK Top 100 Albums Chart, but peaked at number 82 on the UK Albums Downloads chart.)	US: 500,000
PTX, Vol. II	Released: November 5, 2013; Label: Madison Gate, RCA (reissue); Formats: CD, digital download	10	—	—	—	—	—	154	—	35	— (Note: PTX, Vol. II did not enter the UK Top 100 Albums Chart, but peaked at number 49 on the UK Albums Downloads chart.)	
PTX, Vol. III	Released: September 23, 2014; Label: RCA; Formats: CD, digital download	5	19	—	8	21	47	139	89	19	— (Note: PTX, Vol. III did not enter the UK Top 100 Albums Chart, but peaked at number 21 on the UK Albums Downloads chart.)	
PTX, Vol. IV: Classics	Released: April 7, 2017; Label: RCA; Formats: CD, digital download	4	10	20	8	—	—	—	38	14	41	US: 50,000
At Home	Released: June 24, 2020; Label: RCA; Formats: Digital download	— (Note: At Home did not enter the Billboard 200 but did peak at number 63 on the Top Current Albums chart.)	—	—	—	—	—	—	—	—	—	
"—" denotes a recording that did not chart or was not released in that territory.

== Singles ==
Title	Year	Peak chart positions										Certifications	Album or EP
Title	Year	US	US AC	US Hol.	AUS	AUT	BEL (Fl)	CAN	FRA	JPN Hot	NZ	Certifications	Album or EP
"Gangnam Style" (live)	2012	—	—	—	—	—	—	—	—	—	—		Non-album singles
"Crusin' for a Bruisin'" (Inspired by Teen Beach Movie)	2013	—	—	—	—	—	—	—	—	—	—		Non-album singles
"Radioactive" (featuring Lindsey Stirling)	2013	—	—	—	—	—	—	—	—	—	—	RIAA: Gold; MC: Gold	PTX, Vols. 1 & 2
"Daft Punk"	2013	—	—	—	—	—	—	—	105	42	—	RIAA: Gold	PTX, Vol. II
"Little Drummer Boy"	2013	13	27	1	—	8	—	56	—	—	38	MC: Gold	PTXmas (deluxe edition)
"Royals"	2013	—	—	—	—	—	—	—	—	—	—		PTX, Vols. 1 & 2
"Say Something"	2014	—	—	—	—	—	—	89	—	—	—		PTX, Vols. 1 & 2
"Happy"	2014	—	—	—	—	—	—	—	—	—	—		Non-album single
"Problem"	2014	—	—	—	—	—	—	—	—	—	—		PTX, Vol. III
"La La Latch"	2014	— (Note: "La La Latch" did not enter the Billboard Hot 100, but peaked at No. 3 on the Bubbling Under Hot 100 Singles chart.)	—	—	—	—	—	— (Note: "La La Latch" did not enter the Billboard Canadian Hot 100, but peaked at number 72 on the Hot Canadian Digital Song Sales chart.)	—	—	—		PTX, Vol. III
"Mary, Did You Know?"	2014	26	20	1	—	47	—	44	—	—	—	RIAA: Platinum; MC: Gold; RMNZ: Gold	That's Christmas to Me
"Silent Night"	2014	— (Note: "Silent Night" did not enter the Billboard Hot 100 but peaked at number 16 on the Bubbling Under Hot 100 extension chart.)	—	21	—	—	—	—	—	—	—		That's Christmas to Me
"'Wetten, dass..?' Medley"	2014	—	—	—	—	—	—	—	—	—	—		Non-album single
"Cheerleader"	2015	—	—	—	—	—	—	—	—	—	—		Pentatonix
"Can't Sleep Love"	2015	99	19	—	—	—	85	—	—	18	—	RIAA: Gold; MC: Gold	Pentatonix
"Where Are Ü Now"	2015	—	—	—	—	—	—	—	—	—	—		Pentatonix
"If I Ever Fall in Love" (featuring Jason Derulo)	2016	—	— (Note: "If I Ever Fall in Love" did not enter the US Adult Contemporary chart, but peaked at No. 38 on the Adult Pop Airplay chart.)	—	—	—	—	—	—	—	—		Pentatonix
"Perfume Medley"	2016	—	—	—	—	—	—	—	—	91	—		Pentatonix (Japanese version)
"Jolene" (featuring Dolly Parton)	2016	— (Note: "Jolene" did not enter the Billboard Hot 100, but peaked at No. 1 on the Bubbling Under Hot 100 Singles chart.)	—	—	92	—	—	84	—	—	— (Note: "Jolene" did not enter the NZ Top 40 Singles Chart, but peaked at number five on the NZ Heatseekers Singles Chart.)		PTX, Vol. IV - Classics
"Hallelujah"	2016	23	4	2	52	1	42	16	20	—	— (Note: "Hallelujah" did not enter the NZ Top 40 Singles Chart, but peaked at number two on the NZ Heatseekers Singles Chart.)	RIAA: Platinum; ARIA: Platinum; MC: 3× Platinum; RMNZ: Platinum	A Pentatonix Christmas
"Dancing on My Own"	2017	—	—	—	—	—	—	—	—	—	—		Non-album single
"Havana"	2018	— (Note: "Havana" did not enter the Billboard Hot 100, but peaked at number 50 on the Digital Song Sales chart.)	—	—	—	—	—	—	—	71	—		PTX Presents: Top Pop, Vol. 1
"Making Christmas"	2018	—	—	— (Note: "Making Christmas" did not enter the Billboard Holiday 100, but peaked at No. 3 on the Holiday Digital Song Sales chart.)	—	—	—	—	—	—	—		Christmas Is Here!
"The Sound of Silence"	2019	— (Note: "The Sound of Silence" did not enter the Billboard Hot 100, but peaked at number 34 on the Digital Song Sales chart.)	—	—	—	—	—	— (Note: "The Sound of Silence" did not enter the Billboard Canadian Hot 100, but peaked at number 27 on the Hot Canadian Digital Song Sales chart.)	—	—	—		PTX Japan 5th Anniversary Greatest Hits
"Come Along"	2019	—	—	—	—	—	—	—	—	—	—		PTX Japan 5th Anniversary Greatest Hits
"Waving Through a Window"	2019	—	—	—	—	—	—	—	—	—	—		PTX Japan 5th Anniversary Greatest Hits
"Shallow"	2019	—	—	—	—	—	—	—	—	—	—		PTX Japan 5th Anniversary Greatest Hits
"Can You Feel the Love Tonight"	2019	—	—	—	—	—	—	—	—	—	—		PTX Japan 5th Anniversary Greatest Hits
"Pretender"	2019	—	—	—	—	—	—	—	—	48	—		PTX Japan 5th Anniversary Greatest Hits
"Happy Now"	2020	—	—	—	—	—	—	—	—	—	—		The Lucky Ones
"Mad World"	2020	—	—	—	—	—	—	—	—	—	—		Non-album single
"Auld Lang Syne"	2020	—	—	— (Note: "Auld Lang Syne" did not enter the Billboard Holiday 100, but peaked at No. 43 on the Holiday Digital Song Sales chart.)	—	—	—	—	—	—	—		White Christmas
"The Chipmunk Song (Christmas Don't Be Late)" (with Bryson Tiller)	2021	—	—	—	—	—	—	—	—	—	—		Non-album single
"Sweet" (with Jon Batiste and Diane Warren)	2022	—	18	—	—	—	—	—	—	—	—		Diane Warren: The Cave Sessions Vol. 1
"Creep"	2023	—	—	—	—	—	—	—	—	—	—		Non-album singles
"I Rise"	2023	—	—	—	—	—	—	—	—	—	—		Non-album singles
"Happy Birthday Beautiful" (with Ringo Starr)	2023	—	—	—	—	—	—	—	—	—	—		Non-album singles
"Expensive" (with Andy Grammer)	2023	—	—	—	—	—	—	—	—	—	—		Monster (Deluxe)
"Thunder"	2024	—	—	—	—	—	—	—	—	—	—		Ryan's World the Movie: Titan Universe Adventure (The Original Motion Picture Soundtrack)
"Meet Me Next Christmas"	2024	—	21	—	—	—	—	—	—	—	—		Meet Me Next Christmas
"Christmastime Is Finally Here" (with A Great Big World)	2024	—	—	—	—	—	—	—	—	—	—		Non-album single
"Bah Humbug"	2025	—	—	—	—	—	—	—	—	—	—		Christmas in the City
"The Thing I Love" (with Max)	2026	—	—	—	—	—	—	—	—	—	—		Non-album singles
"Heaven on Earth"	2026	—	—	—	—	—	—	—	—	— (Note: "Heaven on Earth" did not enter the Japan Hot 100, but peaked at number 16 on the Billboard Japan Hot Overseas chart.)	—		Non-album singles
"Sacrifice"	2026	—	—	—	—	—	—	—	—	—	—		Non-album singles
"Get Happy / Happy Days Are Here Again"	2026	—	—	—	—	—	—	—	—	—	—		Christmas in the City Deluxe
"Believe"	2026	—	—	—	—	—	—	—	—	—	—		Christmas in the City Deluxe
"—" denotes a recording that did not chart or was not released in that territory.

== Other charted songs ==
Title	Year	Peak chart positions								Certifications	Album or EP
Title	Year	US	US AC	US Christ.	US Hol.	CAN	CAN AC	JPN	WW	Certifications	Album or EP
"Dog Days Are Over"	2011	— (Note: "Dog Days Are Over" did not enter the Billboard Hot 100, but peaked at number 22 on the Heatseekers charts.)	—	—	—	—	—	—	—		The Sing-Off: Season 3 - Episode 10 (Mastermix Medleys & Judges' Choice)
"O Come, O Come Emmanuel"	2012	—	—	—	— (Note: "O Come, O Come Emmanuel" did not enter the Billboard Holiday 100, but peaked at No. 44 on the Holiday Digital Song Sales chart.)	—	—	—	—		PTXmas
"Carol of the Bells"	2012	—	—	—	66	—	—	—	—	MC: Gold	PTXmas
"O Holy Night"	2012	—	—	—	— (Note: "O Holy Night" did not enter the Billboard Holiday 100, but peaked at No. 15 on the Holiday Digital Song Sales chart.)	—	—	—	—		PTXmas
"Go Tell It on the Mountain"	2013	—	—	—	— (Note: "Go Tell It on the Mountain" did not enter the Billboard Holiday 100, but peaked at No. 24 on the Holiday Digital Song Sales chart.)	—	—	—	—		PTXmas
"Hark! The Herald Angels Sing"	2014	—	—	—	96	—	—	—	—		That's Christmas to Me
"White Winter Hymnal"	2014	—	—	—	39	—	—	—	—		That's Christmas to Me
"Sleigh Ride"	2014	—	—	—	— (Note: "Sleigh Ride" did not enter the Billboard Holiday 100, but peaked at No. 12 on the Holiday Digital Song Sales chart.)	—	33	—	—		That's Christmas to Me
"Winter Wonderland" / "Don't Worry, Be Happy" (featuring Tori Kelly)	2014	—	—	—	31	—	30	—	—	MC: Gold	That's Christmas to Me
"That's Christmas to Me"	2014	— (Note: "That's Christmas to Me" did not enter the Billboard Hot 100 but peaked at number 22 on the Bubbling Under Hot 100 extension chart.)	3	—	25	—	3	—	—	MC: Gold	That's Christmas to Me
"Dance of the Sugar Plum Fairy"	2014	—	—	—	27	—	—	—	—		That's Christmas to Me
"It's the Most Wonderful Time of the Year"	2014	—	—	—	— (Note: "It's the Most Wonderful Time of the Year" did not enter the Billboard Holiday 100, but peaked at No. 24 on the Holiday Digital Song Sales chart.)	—	46	—	—		That's Christmas to Me
"Santa Claus Is Coming to Town"	2014	—	—	—	— (Note: "Santa Claus Is Coming to Town" did not enter the Billboard Holiday 100, but peaked at No. 23 on the Holiday Digital Song Sales chart.)	—	44	—	—		That's Christmas to Me
"Joy to the World"	2015	—	9	—	— (Note: "Joy to the World" did not enter the Billboard Holiday 100, but peaked at No. 8 on the Holiday Digital Song Sales chart.)	—	30	—	—		That's Christmas to Me
"Just for Now"	2015	—	—	—	— (Note: "Just for Now" did not enter the Billboard Holiday 100, but peaked at No. 25 on the Holiday Digital Song Sales chart.)	—	—	—	—		That's Christmas to Me
"The First Noel"	2015	—	—	—	91	—	—	—	—		That's Christmas to Me
"Have Yourself a Merry Little Christmas"	2015	—	—	—	— (Note: "Have Yourself a Merry Little Christmas" did not enter the Billboard Holiday 100, but peaked at No. 13 on the Holiday Digital Song Sales chart.)	—	—	—	—		That's Christmas to Me
"O Come, All Ye Faithful"	2016	— (Note: "O Come, All Ye Faithful" did not enter the Billboard Hot 100 but peaked at number 13 on the Bubbling Under Hot 100 extension chart.)	—	—	40	—	—	—	—		A Pentatonix Christmas
"God Rest Ye Merry Gentlemen"	2016	—	—	— (Note: "God Rest Ye Merry Gentlemen" did not enter the Hot Christian Songs chart but peaked at number 48 on the Christian Airplay.)	40	—	—	—	200	MC: Gold	A Pentatonix Christmas
"White Christmas" (featuring The Manhattan Transfer)	2016	—	—	—	97	—	—	—	—		A Pentatonix Christmas
"I'll Be Home for Christmas"	2016	—	—	—	86	—	—	—	—		A Pentatonix Christmas
"Up on the Housetop"	2016	—	—	—	65	—	29	—	—		A Pentatonix Christmas
"The Christmas Sing-Along"	2016	—	—	—	— (Note: "The Christmas Sing-Along" did not enter the Billboard Holiday 100, but peaked at No. 29 on the Holiday Digital Song Sales chart.)	—	—	88	—		A Pentatonix Christmas
"Coventry Carol"	2016	—	—	—	— (Note: "Coventry Carol" did not enter the Billboard Holiday 100, but peaked at No. 9 on the Holiday Digital Song Sales chart.)	—	—	—	—		A Pentatonix Christmas
"Coldest Winter"	2016	—	—	—	95	—	—	—	—		A Pentatonix Christmas
"Good to Be Bad"	2016	—	—	—	— (Note: "Good to Be Bad" did not enter the Billboard Holiday 100, but peaked at No. 31 on the Holiday Digital Song Sales chart.)	—	—	—	—		A Pentatonix Christmas
"Merry Christmas, Happy Holidays"	2016	—	—	—	— (Note: "Merry Christmas, Happy Holidays" did not enter the Billboard Holiday 100, but peaked at No. 12 on the Holiday Digital Song Sales chart.)	—	16	—	—		A Pentatonix Christmas
"Deck the Halls"	2017	—	—	—	— (Note: "Deck the Halls" did not enter the Billboard Holiday 100, but peaked at No. 4 on the Holiday Digital Song Sales chart.)	—	14	—	—		A Pentatonix Christmas
"How Great Thou Art" (featuring Jennifer Hudson)	2017	—	—	—	— (Note: "How Great Thou Art" did not enter the Billboard Holiday 100, but peaked at No. 2 on the Holiday Digital Song Sales chart.)	—	—	—	—		A Pentatonix Christmas
"Away in a Manger"	2017	—	—	—	— (Note: "Away in a Manger" did not enter the Billboard Holiday 100, but peaked at No. 3 on the Holiday Digital Song Sales chart.)	—	48	—	—		A Pentatonix Christmas
"Let It Snow! Let It Snow! Let It Snow!"	2017	—	17	—	— (Note: "Let It Snow! Let It Snow! Let It Snow!" did not enter the Billboard Holiday 100, but peaked at No. 5 on the Holiday Digital Song Sales chart.)	—	—	—	—		A Pentatonix Christmas
"Imagine"	2017	— (Note: "Imagine" did not enter the Billboard Hot 100 but peaked at number 4 on the Bubbling Under Hot 100 extension chart.)	—	—	—	89	—	—	—		PTX, Vol. IV – Classics
"Bohemian Rhapsody"	2017	— (Note: "Bohemian Rhapsody" did not enter the Billboard Hot 100 but peaked at number 4 on the Bubbling Under Hot 100 extension chart.)	—	—	—	76	—	—	—		PTX, Vol. IV – Classics
"What Christmas Means to Me"	2018	—	6	—	— (Note: "What Christmas Means to Me" did not enter the Billboard Holiday 100, but peaked at No. 26 on the Holiday Digital Song Sales chart.)	—	39	—	—		Christmas is Here!
"It's Beginning to Look a Lot Like Christmas"	2018	—	—	—	— (Note: "It's Beginning to Look a Lot Like Christmas" did not enter the Billboard Holiday 100, but peaked at No. 10 on the Holiday Digital Song Sales chart.)	—	35	—	—		Christmas is Here!
"Grown-Up Christmas List" (featuring Kelly Clarkson)	2018	—	21	—	— (Note: "Grown-Up Christmas List" did not enter the Billboard Holiday 100, but peaked at No. 3 on the Holiday Digital Song Sales chart.)	—	—	—	—		Christmas is Here!
"Sweater Weather"	2018	—	—	—	— (Note: "Sweater Weather" did not enter the Billboard Holiday 100, but peaked at No. 24 on the Holiday Digital Song Sales chart.)	—	—	—	—		Christmas is Here!
"When You Believe" (with Maren Morris)	2018	— (Note: "When You Believe" did not enter the Billboard Hot 100 but peaked at number 25 on the Bubbling Under Hot 100 extension chart.)	—	—	— (Note: "When You Believe" did not enter the Billboard Holiday 100, but peaked at No. 4 on the Holiday Digital Song Sales chart.)	—	—	—	—		Christmas is Here!
"Waltz of the Flowers"	2018	—	—	—	— (Note: "Waltz of the Flowers" did not enter the Billboard Holiday 100, but peaked at No. 46 on the Holiday Digital Song Sales chart.)	—	—	—	—		Christmas is Here!
"Here Comes Santa Claus"	2018	—	—	—	— (Note: "Here Comes Santa Claus" did not enter the Billboard Holiday 100, but peaked at No. 22 on the Holiday Digital Song Sales chart.)	—	7	98	—		Christmas is Here!
"Where Are You, Christmas?"	2018	—	—	—	— (Note: "Where Are You Christmas?" did not enter the Billboard Holiday 100, but peaked at No. 5 on the Holiday Digital Song Sales chart.)	—	45	—	—		Christmas is Here!
"Do You Hear What I Hear?" (with Whitney Houston)	2019	—	9	—	— (Note: "Do You Hear What I Hear?" did not enter the Billboard Holiday 100, but peaked at No. 3 on the Holiday Digital Song Sales chart.)	—	—	—	—	RIAA: Gold	The Best of Pentatonix Christmas
"God Only Knows"	2019	—	—	—	— (Note: "God Only Knows" did not enter the Billboard Holiday 100, but peaked at No. 4 on the Holiday Digital Song Sales chart.)	—	37	—	—		The Best of Pentatonix Christmas
"Joyful, Joyful" (with Jazmine Sullivan)	2019	—	—	—	— (Note: "Joyful, Joyful" did not enter the Billboard Holiday 100, but peaked at No. 5 on the Holiday Digital Song Sales chart.)	—	—	—	—		The Best of Pentatonix Christmas
"You're a Mean One, Mr. Grinch"	2019	—	—	—	— (Note: "You're a Mean One, Mr. Grinch" did not enter the Billboard Holiday 100, but peaked at No. 7 on the Holiday Digital Song Sales chart.)	—	—	—	—		The Best of Pentatonix Christmas
"Amazing Grace (My Chains Are Gone)"	2020	— (Note: "Amazing Grace (My Chains Are Gone)" did not enter the Billboard Hot 100, but peaked at number 50 on the Digital Song Sales chart.)	—	4	— (Note: "Amazing Grace (My Chains Are Gone)" did not enter the Billboard Holiday 100, but peaked at No. 1 on the Holiday Digital Song Sales chart.)	—	—	—	—		We Need a Little Christmas
"We Need a Little Christmas"	2020	—	14	—	—	—	—	—	—		We Need a Little Christmas
"Kid on Christmas" (featuring Meghan Trainor)	2022	93	10	—	72	—	27	—	—		Holidays Around the World
"Please Santa Please"	2023	—	10	—	—	—	—	—	—		The Greatest Christmas Hits
"I've Got My Love to Keep Me Warm" (with Frank Sinatra)	2025	—	1	—	—	—	—	—	—		Christmas in the City
"—" denotes a recording that did not chart or was not released in that territory.

== Music videos ==
Title	Year	Director(s)
"Starships"	2012	Colin Duffy
"Aha!"	2012	Gabe Evans
"Carol of the Bells"	2012	
"Save the World / Don't You Worry Child"	2012	FifGen Films
"Radioactive"	2013	FifGen Films
"Can't Hold Us"	2013	FifGen Films
"Royals"	2013	
"Daft Punk"	2013	FifGen Films
"Cruisin' for a Bruisin'"	2013	Ryan Parma
"Little Drummer Boy"	2013	Sean Willis
"Angels We Have Heard on High"	2013	
"I Need Your Love"	2013	FifGen Films
"Run to You"	2014	FifGen Films
"Valentine"	2014	FifGen Films
"Say Something"	2014	Aaron Joseph
"Love Again"	2014	FifGen Films
"We Are Ninjas"	2014	Melissa Bolton-Klinger
"Problem"	2014	FifGen Films
"La La Latch"	2014	
"Papaoutai"	2014	Sherif Higazy
"Rather Be"	2014	
"White Winter Hymnal"	2014	Sean Willis
"Winter Wonderland / Don't Worry Be Happy"	2014	FifGen Films
"Mary, Did You Know?"	2014	Laura Merians
"Silent Night" (live)	2014	Lee Cherry
"Dance of the Sugar Plum Fairy"	2014	FifGen Films
"That's Christmas to Me"	2014	
"Cheerleader"	2015	Sean Davé
"Can't Sleep Love"	2015	
"Where Are Ü Now"	2015	FifGen Films
"Sing"	2015	
"Joy to the World"	2015	
"The First Noel"	2015	
"No"	2016	
"Little People (Todrick Hall)"	2016	
"Perfume Medley"	2016	
"Hallelujah"	2016	
"God Rest Ye Merry Gentlemen"	2016	
"Coldest Winter"	2016	
"O Come, All Ye Faithful"	2016	
"Imagine"	2017	
"Bohemian Rhapsody"	2017	Dano Cerny
"Can't Help Falling in Love"	2017	
"Dancing on My Own"	2017	
"Away in a Manger"	2017	
"Deck the Halls"	2017	
"Havana"	2018	
"New Rules x Are You That Somebody?"	2018	
"Attention"	2018	
"Perfect"	2018	
"Making Christmas"	2018	
"Sweater Weather"	2018	
"Where Are You Christmas?"	2018	
"What Christmas Means to Me"	2018	
"The Sound of Silence"	2019	
"Come Along"	2019	
"Waving Through a Window"	2019	
"Shallow"	2019	
"Can You Feel the Love Tonight"	2019	
"You're a Mean One, Mr. Grinch"	2019	
"Home"	2020	
"My Favorite Things"	2020	
"Blinding Lights"	2020	
"When the Party's Over"	2020	
"Break My Heart"	2020	
"Dreams"	2020	
"Happy Now"	2020	
"Mad World"	2020	
"Be My Eyes"	2020	
"Amazing Grace (My Chains Are Gone)"	2020	
"Dear My Friend" (Little Glee Monster featuring Pentatonix)	2020	
"Coffee in Bed"	2021	
"Love Me When I Don't" (Live)	2021	
"90s Dance Medley"	2021	
"A Little Space" (LMNT Mix)	2021	
"Butter x Dynamite"	2021	
"A Little Space" (featuring Ateez)	2021	
"Midnight in Tokyo" (featuring Little Glee Monster)	2021	
"It's Been a Long, Long Time"	2021	
"I Just Called to Say I Love You"	2021	
"The Prayer"	2021	
"Over the River" (featuring Lindsey Stirling)	2021	
"Prayers for This World"	2022	
"Kid on Christmas" (featuring Meghan Trainor)	2022	
"Last Christmas" (featuring Hikakin and Seikin)	2022	
"Christmas in Our Hearts" (featuring Lea Salonga)	2022	
"Please Santa Please"	2023	
"O Holy Night"	2023	
