= PTX, Vol. IV: Classics =

EP by Pentatonix
- Released: April 7, 2017
- Recorded: 2016–2017
- Genres: A cappella; rock; country; pop
- Length: 25:04
- Label: RCA
- Producer: Ben Bram

Pentatonix chronology
A Pentatonix Christmas (2016)	PTX, Vol. IV: Classics (2017)	PTX Presents: Top Pop, Vol. I (2018)

Singles from PTX, Vol. IV: Classics
- 1. "Jolene" Released: September 16, 2016

PTX, Vol. IV: Classics is the fifth extended play by the a cappella group Pentatonix. It was released by RCA Records on April 7, 2017, and is their first EP since 2014's PTX, Vol. III. It is their final release with original member Avi Kaplan, who left the group later that year.

Their second work after PTXmas to not feature any original material, the album marks a departure from the group's typical sound, which mostly consists of either modern pop songs or Christmas music, choosing instead to focus on standards of rock, blues, country, and older pop music.

"Jolene", featuring the original artist, Dolly Parton, earned her and Pentatonix a Grammy Award for Best Country Duo/Group Performance.

== Critical reception ==
The group's cover of "Jolene", originally released as a single and later included in the EP, was particularly praised. Julia Brucculieri of The Huffington Post called the version "a hauntingly beautiful a cappella update" Markos Papadatos of Digital Journal called it a "stellar version", stating that "Pentatonix proves yet again that they can do no wrong with anything they sing or cover. The addition of Dolly Parton helps elevate 'Jolene' to a higher level, and they prove that it is possible for heaven to be a place on earth. Their a cappella rendition earns five out of five stars." Stefan Kyriazis of the Daily Express called it a "remarkable new version of the old standard. 'Jolene' was released way back in 1973 but has never sounded fresher."

Sara Vallone of the Independent Journal Review stated that "Pentatonix just did justice to Dolly Parton's 'Jolene'", and that "Parton is proving once again just how timeless she truly is". The cover eventually won the Grammy Award for Best Country Duo/Group Performance. Parton had been nominated for Best Female Country Vocal Performance twice for the song, first for its 1973 original release and then in 1976 for a live version; this resulted in the song earning her a Grammy 44 years after its original release.

In an online review, Brandy McDonnell of The Oklahoman called the group's cover of "Bohemian Rhapsody" "an incredible rendition [...] that highlights the quintet's sterling harmonies and vocal effects."

== Commercial performance ==
PTX, Vol. IV: Classics debuted at number four on the Billboard 200 with 54,000 album-equivalent units, of which 50,000 were pure album sales.

== Track listing ==
No.	Title	Writer(s)	Lead vocals	Length
1.	"Bohemian Rhapsody" (Queen cover)	Freddie Mercury	Mitch Grassi, Kirstin Maldonado, Scott Hoying, Avi Kaplan	5:55
2.	"Imagine" (John Lennon cover)	John Lennon	Kaplan, Hoying, Grassi, Maldonado, Kevin Olusola	4:20
3.	"Boogie Woogie Bugle Boy" (The Andrews Sisters cover)	Don Raye, Hughie Prince	Maldonado, Grassi, Hoying	2:18
4.	"Over the Rainbow" (from The Wizard of Oz)	Harold Arlen, E.Y. Harburg	Maldonado	3:54
5.	"Take On Me" (A-ha cover)	Magne Furuholmen, Morten Harket, Pål Waaktaar	Grassi, Hoying	3:28
6.	"Can't Help Falling in Love" (Elvis Presley cover)	Hugo Peretti, Luigi Creatore, George David Weiss	Grassi	2:58
7.	"Jolene" (Dolly Parton cover)	Dolly Parton	Parton, Hoying	2:11
Total length:				25:04

Japanese bonus track
No.	Title	Length
8.	"Na Na Na"	2:35
Total length:		27:39

== Personnel ==
Pentatonix

- Scott Hoying – baritone, lead and backing vocals
- Mitch Grassi – tenor lead and backing vocals
- Kirstin Maldonado – alto lead and backing vocals
- Avi Kaplan – vocal bass, bass lead and backing vocals
- Kevin Olusola – beatboxing, backing vocals, lead vocals on "Imagine", vocal flugelhorn on "Boogie Woogie Bugle Boy"

Additional personnel

- Pentatonix, Ben Bram – production, arranger, engineer
- Dolly Parton – lead vocals on "Jolene"
- Andrew Kesler – arranger
- Ed Boyer – mixing
- Bill Hare – mastering

== Charts ==
Chart (2017)	Peak position
Australian Albums (ARIA)	10
Austrian Albums (Ö3 Austria)	20
Canadian Albums (Billboard)	8
Czech Albums (ČNS IFPI)	28
German Albums (Offizielle Top 100)	94
Italian Albums (FIMI)	13
Japanese Albums (Oricon)	34
New Zealand Albums (RMNZ)	14
Scottish Albums (Official Charts)	37
Slovak Albums (ČNS IFPI)	23
Swiss Albums (Schweizer Hitparade)	26
UK Albums (Official Charts)	41
US Billboard 200	4
