= PTX, Vol. II =

EP by Pentatonix
- Released: November 5, 2013
- Recorded: Summer 2013
- Genre: A cappella
- Length: 30:56
- Label: Madison Gate
- Producer: Ben Bram

Pentatonix chronology
PTXmas (2012)	PTX, Vol. II (2013)	PTX, Vols. 1 & 2 (2014)

PTX, Vol. II (Volume 2) is the third extended play (EP) by American a cappella group Pentatonix. It was released digitally on November 5, 2013, while physical versions of the album were available from November 12, 2013. As of October 23, 2015, PTX, Vol. II has sold 199,965 copies.

== Track listing ==
No.	Title	Writer(s)	Original Artist	Length
1.	"Can't Hold Us"	Macklemore, Ryan Lewis	Macklemore, Ryan Lewis	3:18
2.	"Natural Disaster"	Pentatonix		3:30
3.	"Love Again"	Pentatonix		3:18
4.	"Valentine"	Jessie Ware, Sampha	Jessie Ware, Sampha	2:37
5.	"Hey Momma / Hit the Road Jack"	Kevin Olusola, Percy Mayfield	Pentatonix / Percy Mayfield [respectively]	3:01
6.	"I Need Your Love"	Calvin Harris, Ellie Goulding	Calvin Harris	2:52
7.	"Run to You"	Pentatonix, Ben Bram		4:25
8.	"Daft Punk"	Thomas Bangalter, Guy-Manuel de Homem-Christo	Daft Punk	4:08
9.	"Save the World / Don't You Worry Child" (iTunes pre-order exclusive)	Axwell, Steve Angello, Sebastian Ingrosso, John Martin, Michel Zitron, Vincent Pontare	Swedish House Mafia	3:47
Total length:				30:56

== Charts ==
=== Weekly charts ===
Chart (2013)	Peak position
Belgian Albums (Ultratop Flanders)	114
Belgian Albums (Ultratop Wallonia)	113
French Albums (SNEP)	154
US Billboard 200	10
US Digital Albums (Billboard)	2
US Independent Albums (Billboard)	1

=== Year-end charts ===
Chart (2014)	Position
US Billboard Independent Albums	27

== Personnel ==
Pentatonix

- Mitch Grassi - tenor lead and backing vocals
- Scott Hoying - baritone lead and backing vocals
- Kirstin Maldonado - alto lead and backing vocals
- Avi Kaplan - vocal bass, bass lead and backing vocals
- Kevin Olusola - vocal percussion, spoken vocals on "Can't Hold Us", backing vocals on "I Need Your Love" and "Run to You"

Production

- Ben Bram - production
- Bill Hare - audio engineering
