= PTX, Vol. III =

EP by Pentatonix
- Released: September 23, 2014
- Recorded: 2014
- Genre: A cappella
- Length: 24:01
- Language: English; French
- Label: RCA
- Producer: Ben Bram

Pentatonix chronology
PTX (2014)	PTX, Vol. III (2014)	That's Christmas to Me (2014)

PTX, Vol. III (Volume 3) is the fourth extended play album by the a cappella group Pentatonix. It was released on September 23, 2014 by RCA Records, although it was released earlier in Australia on September 19, 2014. The extended play contains four covers as well as three original tracks ("On My Way Home", "See Through" and "Standing By"). As of October 23, 2015, PTX, Vol. III has sold 201,226 copies.

== Background ==
In April and May 2014 during their European tour, Pentatonix began working on PTX Vol. III. Since they weren't always in one place at a time, the album was recorded at various tour locations such as Singapore, New York City and Japan. The arrangement and recording process in the album was different to those of previous albums as the songs were pre-arranged and the outline of the song was created before its details were filled in. The song "On My Way Home" was originally written by the British alternative rock band Coldplay for their seventh studio album, A Head Full of Dreams, was given to Pentatonix and left off the final track list.

== Track listing ==
No.	Title	Writer(s)	Original artist	Length
1.	"Problem"	Max Martin; Savan Kotecha; Ilya Salmanzadeh; Amethyst Kelly	Ariana Grande featuring Iggy Azalea	2:28
2.	"On My Way Home"	Guy Berryman; Jonny Buckland; Will Champion; Chris Martin; Jordan Johnson; Sam Martin; Marcus Lomax; Jason Evigan; Stefan Johnson; Clarence Coffee	Pentatonix	3:15
3.	"La La Latch"	James Murray; Shahid Khan; James Napier; Mustafa Omer; Jonathan Coffer; Al-Hakam El Kaubaisy; Frobisher Mbabazi; Sam Smith; Guy Lawrence; Howard Lawrence	Naughty Boy/Disclosure featuring Sam Smith [respectively]	3:41
4.	"Rather Be"	James Napier; Jack Patterson; Grace Chatto; Nicole Marshall	Clean Bandit featuring Jess Glynne	3:32
5.	"See Through"	Kerli Kõiv; Thomas Kirjonen; Joonas Angeria	Pentatonix	3:19
6.	"Papaoutai" (featuring Lindsey Stirling)	Paul Van Haver	Stromae	3:33
7.	"Standing By"	Pentatonix	Pentatonix	4:13
Total length:				24:01

== Charts ==
Chart (2014)	Peak position
Australian Albums (ARIA)	19
Canadian Albums (Billboard)	8
Danish Albums (Hitlisten)	21
Finnish Albums (Suomen virallinen lista)	47
Italian Albums (FIMI)	89
New Zealand Albums (RMNZ)	19
US Billboard 200	5
US Digital Albums (Billboard)	3

== Release history ==
Region	Date	Format	Label
Australia	September 19, 2014	CD, digital download	RCA Records
United Kingdom	September 21, 2014	CD, digital download	RCA Records
Canada	September 23, 2014	CD, digital download	RCA Records
United States	September 23, 2014	CD, digital download	RCA Records

== Personnel ==
=== Pentatonix ===
- Mitch Grassi – tenor lead and backing vocals, rapping on "Problem"
- Scott Hoying – baritone lead and backing vocals, vocal bass and bass backing vocals on "Standing By"
- Kirstin Maldonado – alto lead and backing vocals
- Avi Kaplan – vocal bass, bass lead and backing vocals
- Kevin Olusola – vocal percussion, cello on "Papaoutai", rapping on "Problem"

=== Additional personnel ===
- Lindsey Stirling – violin on "Papaoutai"
- Ben Bram – production
