= PTX, Vols. 1 & 2 =

- Japanese cover

Studio album by Pentatonix
- Released: July 30, 2014
- Recorded: 2012–14
- Genre: A cappella
- Length: 65:49
- Label: RCA
- Producer: Ben Bram

Pentatonix chronology
PTX, Vol. II (2013)	PTX, Vols. 1 & 2 (2014)	PTX (2014)

PTX, Vols. 1 & 2 is the fourth release by Pentatonix, first released on July 30, 2014, in Japan. Considered their debut studio album, it is a compilation of all sixteen recordings from their two namesake EPs (PTX, Vol. I and PTX, Vol. II), as well as three tracks previously released as singles.

The Japanese version contains an exclusive cover of "Let It Go" (which was later released in the US on their Christmas album, That's Christmas to Me), the only previously unreleased track of the album. PTX, Vols. 1 & 2 is the first Pentatonix album released under their new label, RCA Records.

It was released in Australia on August 15, 2014, and in Korea on August 28, 2014, and subsequently in the Philippines on September 26, 2014. The Australian edition features roughly the same cover but is colored blue with "Australian Edition" beneath the graphic. On the Philippines edition, the center graphic is shaded with red (left portion), yellow (center portion) and blue (right portion) which match the colors on the flag of the Philippines and it has "Philippines Edition" beneath the graphic. On the Korean edition, the center design is shaded with a gradient fade of red, to white, to blue, matching the colors of both the North and South Korean flags with "Korea Edition" printed below it.

== Track listing ==
Standard edition
No.	Title	Writer(s)	Original artist	Length
1.	"Starships"	Onika Maraj; Nadir Khayat; Rami Yacoub; Carl Falk; Wayne Hector	Nicki Minaj	3:01
2.	"The Baddest Girl"	Scott Hoying	Pentatonix	3:49
3.	"Somebody That I Used to Know"	Wally de Backer; Luiz Bonfá	Gotye featuring Kimbra	3:19
4.	"Aha!"	Imogen Jennifer Jane Heap	Imogen Heap	2:37
5.	"Show You How to Love"	Avi Kaplan; Kevin Olusola	Pentatonix	3:53
6.	"Love You Long Time"	Salaam Remi; Jazmine Sullivan	Jazmine Sullivan	3:05
7.	"We Are Young"	Nate Ruess; Andrew Dost; Jack Antonoff; Jeffrey Bhasker	fun. featuring Janelle Monáe	3:07
8.	"Can't Hold Us"	Macklemore; Ryan Lewis	Macklemore; Ryan Lewis	3:18
9.	"Natural Disaster"	Pentatonix		3:30
10.	"Love Again"	Pentatonix		3:18
11.	"Valentine"	Jessie Ware; Sampha		2:37
12.	"Hey Momma / Hit the Road Jack"	Kevin Olusola; Percy Mayfield	Pentatonix / Percy Mayfield [respectively]	3:01
13.	"I Need Your Love"	Calvin Harris; Ellie Goulding	Calvin Harris featuring Ellie Goulding	2:52
14.	"Run to You"	Pentatonix; Ben Bram		4:25
15.	"Daft Punk"	Thomas Bangalter; Guy-Manuel de Homem-Christo	Daft Punk	4:08
16.	"Save the World / Don't You Worry Child"	Axwell; Steve Angello; Sebastian Ingrosso; John Martin; Michel Zitron; Vincent Pontare	Swedish House Mafia	3:47
17.	"Radioactive" (featuring Lindsey Stirling)	Ben McKee; Dan Platzman; Dan Reynolds; Wayne Sermon; Alexander Grant; Josh Mosser	Imagine Dragons	3:46
18.	"Say Something"	Ian Axel; Chad Vaccarino; Mike Campbell	A Great Big World	4:33
19.	"Royals"	Ella Yelich O'Connor; Joel Little	Lorde	3:51
Total length:				1:05:49

Japanese bonus track
No.	Title	Writer(s)	Original artist	Length
20.	"Let It Go"	Kristen Anderson-Lopez, Robert Lopez	Idina Menzel	3:22
Total length:				1:09:11
