= Scott Hoying =

American singer (born 1991)

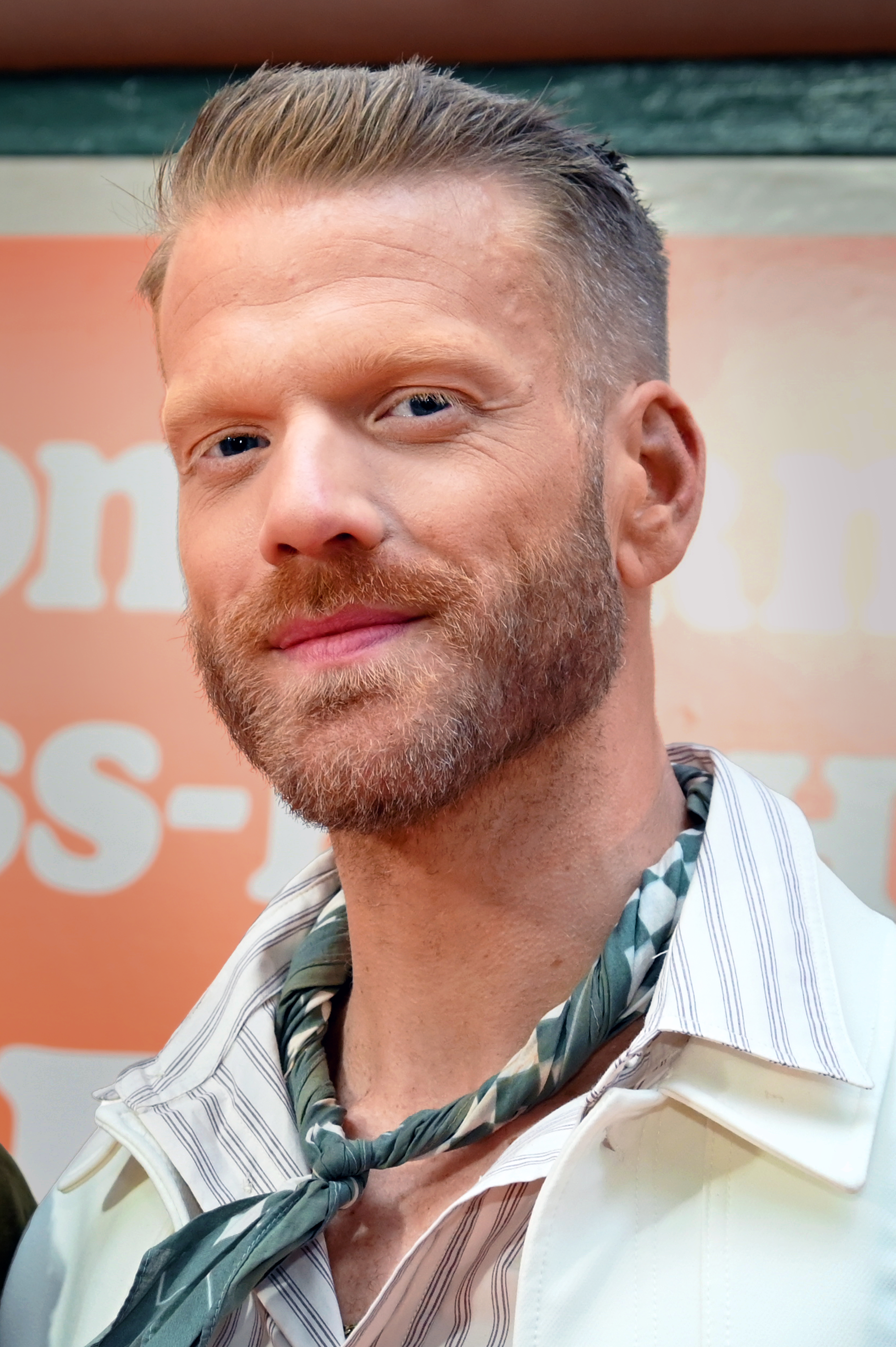
- Hoying in 2026

Background information
- Born: September 17, 1991 (age 35); Arlington, Texas, U.S.
- Education: Martin High School; University of Southern California
- Genres: A cappella; pop; R&B; soul
- Occupations: Singer; songwriter
- Years active: 2004–present
- Member of: Pentatonix; Superfruit
- Spouse: Mark Manio (m. 2023)

Scott Hoying (born September 17, 1991) is an American singer who came to international attention as the baritone of the a cappella group Pentatonix. As of 2025, Pentatonix has released eleven albums (two of which have been number ones) and two EPs, have had four songs in the Billboard Hot 100, and won three Grammy Awards as "the first a cappella group to achieve mainstream success in the modern market".

== Early life and education ==
Scott Richard Hoying was born in Arlington, Texas, to Connie and Rick Hoying. After graduating high school, he briefly attended the University of Southern California, where he studied popular music performance.

Pentatonix started as a trio, as Hoying, Mitch Grassi, and Kirstin Maldonado had been in choir for most of their time in high school. The three quickly put together an a cappella cover of "Telephone" by Lady Gaga featuring Beyoncé to compete in a local radio station contest to meet Glee cast members. They did not win but kept competing and performing, gaining popularity.

Hoying heard about The Sing-Off reality-show competition for a cappella acts; he gained an interest in the genre once in college. It was the first time the trio had embraced a cappella. The show required groups to have five or more members, so they recruited bass vocalist Avi Kaplan and singer/beat boxer Kevin Olusola. After they won, they all relocated to Los Angeles to pursue recording artist careers. The main goal of the group was to become the first modern mainstream a cappella group, which they have done.

== Career ==
=== Pentatonix ===
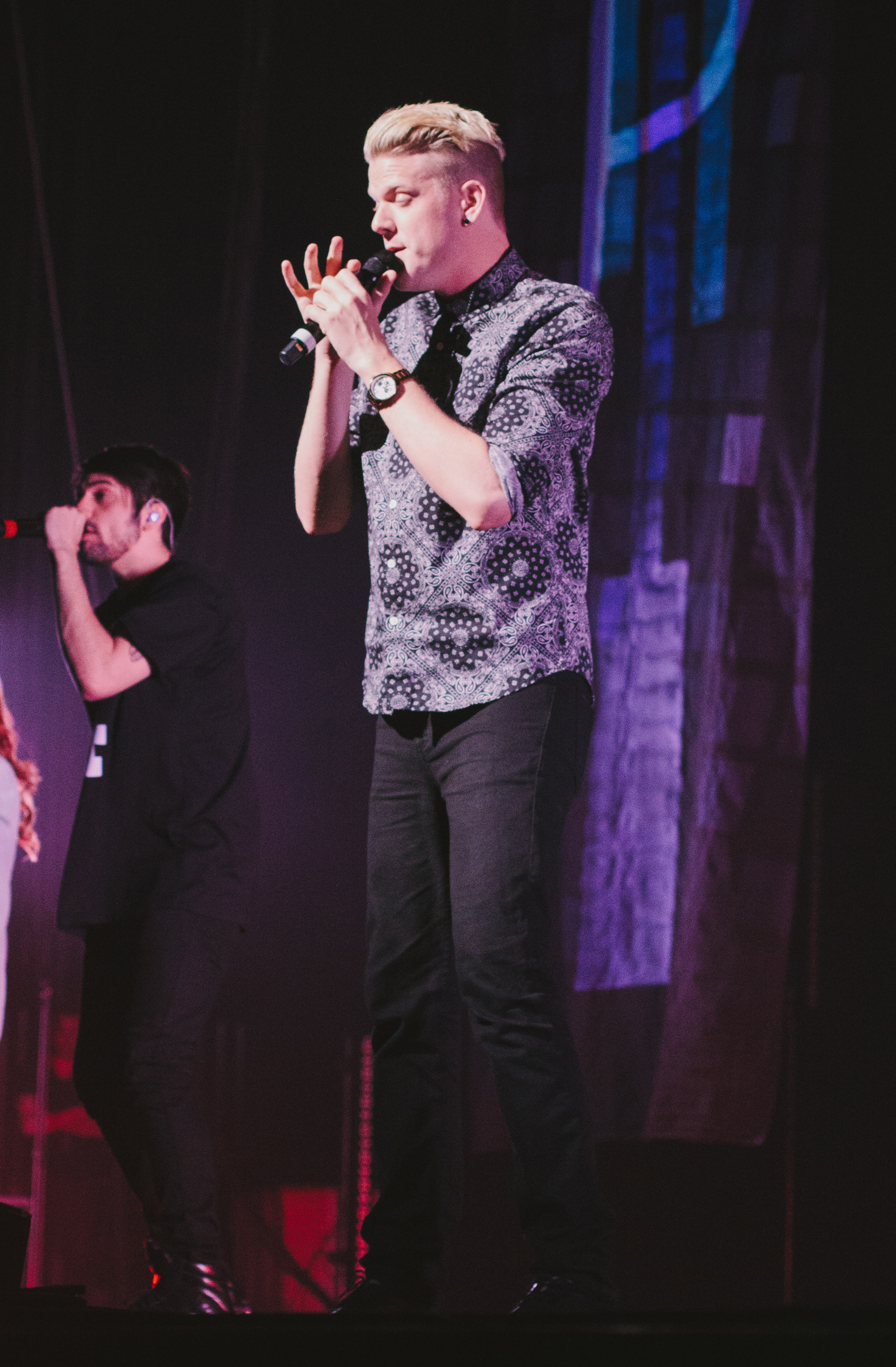
Hoying performing with Pentatonix in 2014

Pentatonix is an a cappella collective and a quintet; most of their songs are covers and much of their success comes from touring, including internationally. They gained national attention in the U.S. competing on NBC's a cappella reality show The Sing-Off in 2011, which they won. The group got a record label, who dropped them as their audience was too niche—with no guarantee of selling albums, or concert tickets—but the group felt it was ultimately advantageous as around late 2012 Pentatonix started posting videos to YouTube building an international fan base. Pentatonix also released the debut EP, PTX, Volume 1, on their new label in June 2012, followed by a Christmas EP, PTXmas in November. They recorded covers of pop 40 hits like Gotye's "Somebody That I Used to Know" (2011), Psy's "Gangnam Style" (2012), and Fun's "We Are Young" (2011). Their big video hit was a November 2013 video of a medley of Daft Punk songs. It had ten million views in the first week of its release and rose to over 150 million views; as of 2025 it has over 380 million views.

As of March 2015 they had 7.6 million YouTube subscribers. By October 2019 that number rose to seventeen million and in December 2020, 18.9 million; the channel has over three billion video views. As of February 2020, they had over 4.4 billion views; they also have 3.6 million followers on Instagram, and 5.1 million on Facebook.

They also tour extensively including across North America, Europe, Asia, and Latin America—over an estimated forty countries as of December 2016; and have had cameos in shows and movies like Bones and Pitch Perfect 2 (2015); and their own television show, A Pentatonix Christmas Special (2016).

As of June 2021, Pentatonix has released eleven albums, ten of which reached the Top Ten on the Billboard 200, all combined selling ten million albums—including two number one albums, and five of Christmas music—and have had four songs in the Billboard Hot 100, and won three Grammy Awards. Their three Grammy wins were for their: Daft Punk medley tribute to the French electronic music duo (2015); version of Pyotr Ilyich Tchaikovsky's "Dance of the Sugar Plum Fairy" (2016); Jolene collaboration with Dolly Parton (2017). In addition to their regular tours, they use their extensive holiday music for Christmastime tours. Their That's Christmas to Me (2014) is the highest-charting Christmas album by a group of two or more since 1962.

The individual members find inspiration to cover recent songs, as well as international classics, then if they decide as a group it is a good match, they compose an arrangement; their friend Ben Bram, who is also their producer, is their co-arranger. Although they are known for their covers and re-arranged popular songs, the band released their first album, Pentatonix, in October 2015, and it was all original music; it also marked the first time an a cappella group had the top album on the Billboard 200 album chart. Their sold-out North American tour that year was documented in the movie, On My Way Home.

=== Superfruit ===
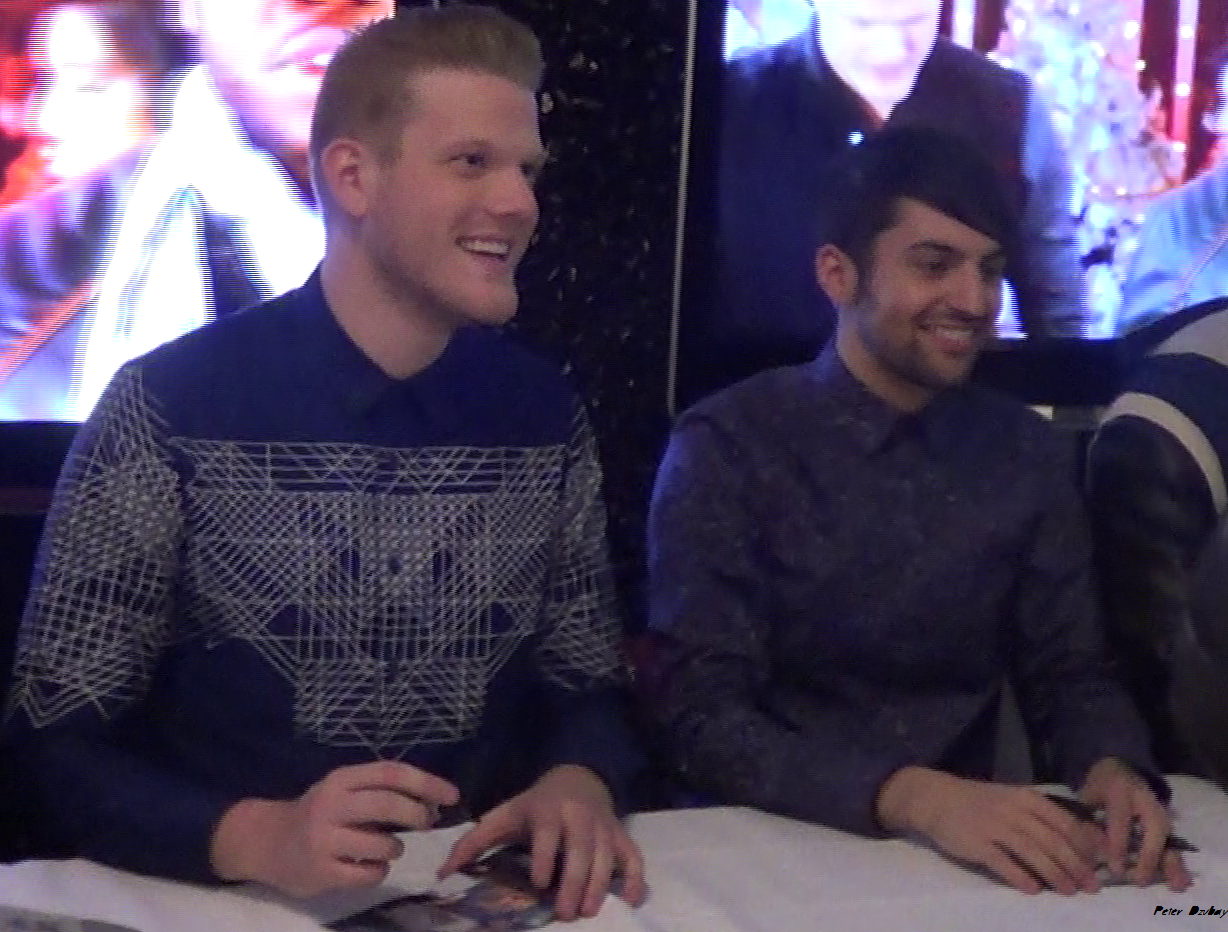
Hoying and Mitch Grassi (pictured in 2014) make up Superfruit.

In 2013, Hoying teamed up with Grassi in Superfruit. The comedy and music YouTube channel gathered half-a-billion views, attracted 2.4 million YouTube subscribers, and garnered hundreds of millions of streams across songs like "GUY.exe."

=== Solo music ===
In 2023 Hoying released his solo debut extended play, Parallel. The lead single "Mars" was released July 2023 generated millions of streams across platforms. He delivered a performance of the title track on Today and "Mars" on the Kelly Clarkson Show. The Associated Press hailed the EP as "his most personal music to date." In 2025, Hoying's song "Rose Without The Thorns", a tribute to his husband Mark, earned him his first solo nomination for Best Arrangement, Instrumental or A Cappella at the 67th Annual Grammy Awards.

=== Achievements ===
In 2023, Hoying received a Sports Emmy Award for Outstanding Music Direction as a co-music director for America's Youth Choir rendition of "Ragged Old Flag" at Super Bowl LVII. In 2024, Hoying and his husband Mark published a children's book entitled How Lucky Am I?, landing on USA Today's best-selling booklist.

=== Dancing with the Stars ===
On September 3, 2025, Hoying was announced as a participant of the thirty-fourth season of the reality competition series Dancing with the Stars. He was partnered with professional dancer Rylee Arnold. They were eliminated during the sixth week of competition on October 21, finishing in tenth place.

== Personal life ==
Hoying is gay. He began dating model Mark Manio in 2017. They got engaged in the Bahamas on April 13, 2022, and were married in Santa Barbara, California, on July 7, 2023. Their wedding was officiated by singer-songwriter Christina Perri. On October 14, 2025, during Dedication Night on Dancing with the Stars, Hoying and Manio announced that they were expecting their first child via surrogacy. Their daughter, Birdie James Hoying, was born on June 3, 2026.

== Discography ==
=== Studio albums ===
List of studio albums, with selected information
Title	Details
Parallel	Released: July 28, 2023; Label: BMG; Formats: CD, digital download

=== Singles ===
List of singles
Title	Year	Album
"Mars"	2022	Parallel
"Parallel"	2023	Parallel
"Four"	2023	Parallel
"Extraordinary"	2023	Parallel
"Flaunt It"	2024	Non-album single
"Mad About You"	2024	Non-album single
"Rose Without the Thorns"	2024	Non-album single
"Pray"	2025	Non-album single
"Great Rainbow"	2025	Non-album single

=== Features ===
As featured artist
Title	Year	Artist	Album
"All for Me" (featuring Scott Hoying)	2017	Hoodie Allen	The Hype
"Ghost" (Frankie & Scott Hoying)	2018	Frankie	Non-album single
"Lose Us" (featuring Scott Hoying)	2018	Rozzi	Bad Together
"All to Me" (featuring Scott Hoying)	2018	Shoshana Bean	Non-album single
"Sensitive" (featuring Scott Hoying)	2022	Meghan Trainor	Takin' It Back
"Come Alive" (featuring Scott Hoying)	2024	Loren Allred	The Showman Sessions
"Baby Names" (featuring Scott Hoying)	2025	Julia Harriman	Non-album single
"Rainmaker"	2025	Janani K. Jha	Non-album single

== Songwriting and production credits ==
All credits are adapted from the American Society of Composers, Authors and Publishers's database.

== Filmography ==
=== Television ===
Year	Title	Role	Notes
2016	Bones	Ted Gibbs	Guest Cast (The Strike in the Chord; Season 11 Ep.16)
2021	Centaurworld	Mouthpiece	2 seasons
2023	High School Musical: The Musical: The Series	Scott	Guest cast (Season 4)
2025	Dancing with the Stars	Contestant	Season 34

Film

Year	Title	Role
2015	Pitch Perfect 2	Team Canada
2024	Meet Me Next Christmas	Scott

== Awards and nominations ==
Awards	Year	Category	Work	Result	Ref.
Billboard Music Awards	2015	Top Billboard 200 Album	That's Christmas to Me	Nominated	
Billboard Music Awards	2015	Top Billboard 200 Artist	Pentatonix	Nominated	
Daytime Emmy Awards	2017	Outstanding Musical Performance in a Daytime Program	"God Rest Ye Merry Gentlemen" on Rachael Ray	Nominated	
Daytime Emmy Awards	2021	Outstanding Original Song	"Cabana Boy Troy" on The Kelly Clarkson Show	Nominated	
Grammy Awards	2015	Best Arrangement, Instrumental or A Cappella	"Daft Punk"	Won	
Grammy Awards	2016	Best Arrangement, Instrumental or A Cappella	"Dance of the Sugar Plum Fairy"	Won	
Grammy Awards	2017	Best Country Duo/Group Performance	"Jolene" (ft. Dolly Parton)	Won	
Grammy Awards	2023	Best Traditional Pop Vocal Album	Evergreen	Nominated	
Grammy Awards	2024	Best Traditional Pop Vocal Album	Holidays Around the World	Nominated	
Grammy Awards	2025	Best Arrangement, Instrumental or A Cappella	"Rose Without the Thorns"	Nominated	
IHeartRadio Music Awards	2016	Best Cover Song	"Cheerleader"	Nominated	
Nickelodeon Kids' Choice Awards	2016	Favorite Music Group	Pentatonix	Nominated	
Nickelodeon Kids' Choice Awards	2017	Favorite Music Group	Pentatonix	Nominated	
Shorty Awards	2015	Best YouTube Musician	Pentatonix	Won	
Sports Emmy Awards	2023	Outstanding Music Direction	Super Bowl LVII: "Ragged Old Flag: An American Chorus"	Won	
Streamy Awards	2014	Best Cover Song	"Daft Punk"	Won	
Streamy Awards	2014	Best Original Song	"Love Again"	Nominated	
Streamy Awards	2014	Best Musical Artist	Pentatonix	Nominated	
Streamy Awards	2015	Best Collaboration	Pentatonix and Lindsey Stirling	Nominated	
Streamy Awards	2015	Best Cover Song	"Evolution of Michael Jackson"	Nominated	
Tony Awards	2026	Best Musical	Titanique as Co-producer	Pending	
YouTube Music Awards	2013	Response of the Year	"Radioactive" (with Lindsey Stirling)	Won	
YouTube Music Awards	2015	Artist of the Year	Pentatonix	Won	
Webby Awards	2016	Video Remixes/Mashups	Evolution of Michael Jackson	Nominated	
World Choreography Awards	2017	Best Choreography in a Music Video	Sweet Life	Won	
