= Frankie Bird =

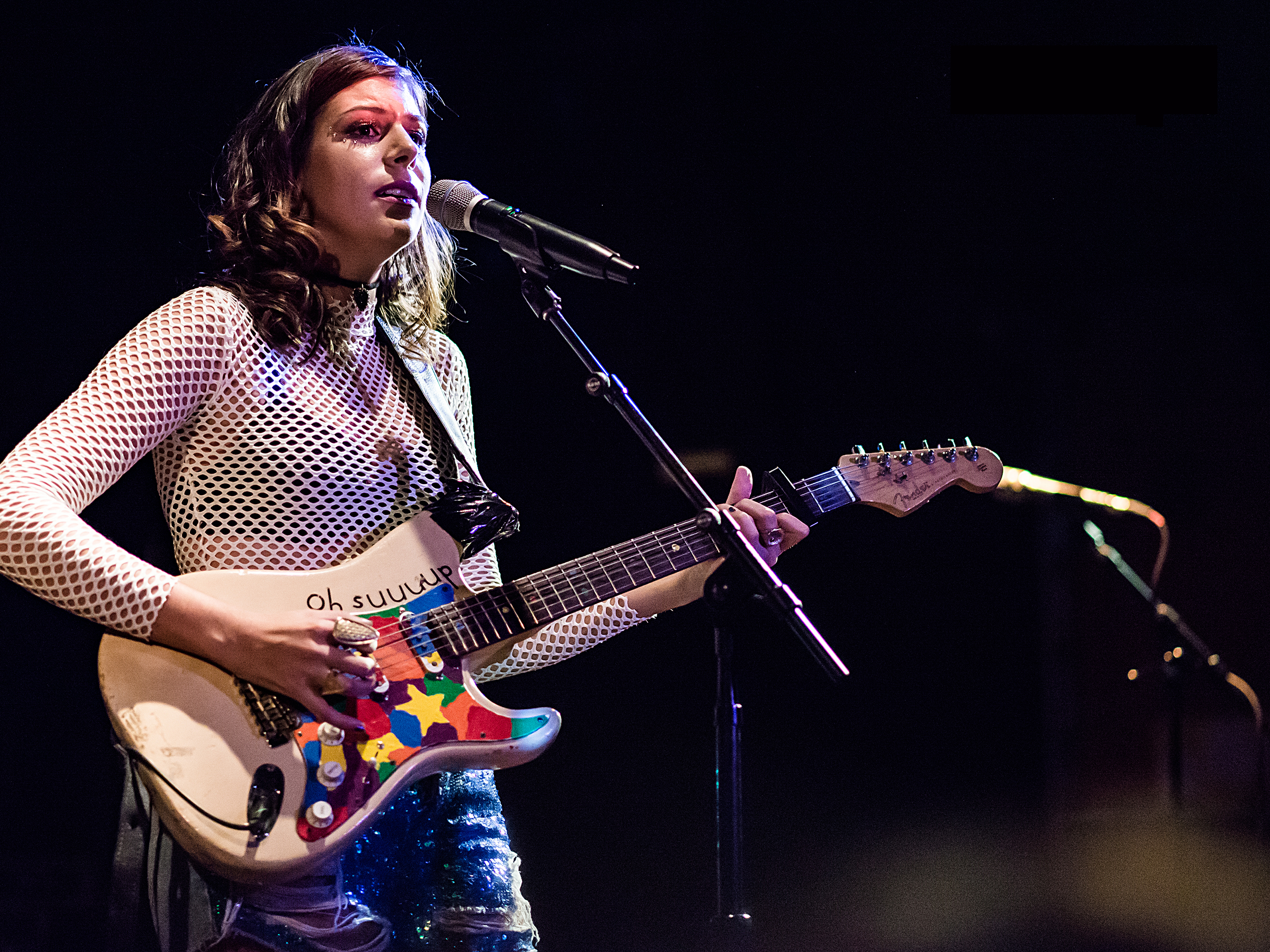
- Frankie Bird performing in 2016

Background information
- Also known as: Frankie
- Born: Francesca Rose Miller; Oakland, California
- Origin: Los Angeles, California
- Genres: Indie pop
- Years active: 2015–present
- Label: RCA
- Website: www.frankiebirdmusic.com

Francesca Rose "Frankie" Miller, known professionally as Frankie Bird (formerly FRANKIE), is an American indie pop musician from Los Angeles, California.

== Career ==
Bird released her debut EP in 2015 titled Dreamstate via RCA Records. On October 6, 2015, Taylor Swift tweeted an image of a list titled "New Songs That Will Make Your Life More Awesome", with Bird's "New Obsession" one of the eleven featured on the list.

Bird is currently working on her debut studio album, which was predicted to be released via RCA in September 2018, but has not been released yet. In early 2017 she joined Daya as support on a United States tour.

In May 2023, Bird announced that she would no longer be releasing music as Frankie. She stated that this change was due to fans's inability to locate her social media as well as a change in musical style. Bird released her debut album Twenty Something on June 6, 2024, which includes the singles "Twenty Nothing", "When We Were Young", "Float", "If I'm Being Honest" and "Miss You Love You".

== Discography ==
=== Studio albums ===
Title	Album details
Twenty Something	Released: June 6, 2024; Label: Self-released; Formats: Digital download

=== Extended plays ===
List of extended plays
Title	Album details
Dreamstate	Released: 3 March 2016; Label: RCA; Format: Digital download
STA7GES	Released: February 15, 2019; Label: Independent; Format: Digital download
Cocoon	Released: October 14, 2021; Label: Independent; Format: Digital download

=== Singles ===
Year	Title	Peak chart positions	Album
Year	Title	SWE Heat	Album
Credited as Frankie
2015	"Problems Problems"	—	Dreamstate
2015	"New Obsession"	20	Dreamstate
2016	"Blink"	—	Non-album single
2017	"Paper Doll"	—	Non-album single
2017	"Coping"	—	Non-album single
2018	"Ghost" (with Scott Hoying featuring One Night)	—	Non-album single
2018	"When I'm Ready"	—	STA7GES
2018	"You Decided"	—	STA7GES
2019	"Lost in Translation"	—	STA7GES
2019	"Underdog"	—	Non-album single
2020	"Home Alone"	—	Cocoon
2020	"Almost Famous"	—	Cocoon
2020	"The Hard Way"	—	Cocoon
2021	"The Catch"	—	Cocoon
2021	"Don't Look at Me Like I'm Still Your Girl"	—	Cocoon
Credited as Frankie Bird
2023	"Twenty Nothing"	—	Twenty Something
2023	"When We Were Young"	—	Twenty Something
2023	"Float"	—	Twenty Something
2023	"If I'm Being Honest"	—	Twenty Something
2024	"Miss You Love You"	—	Twenty Something
"—" denotes a single that did not chart or was not released.

== Tours ==
Supporting

- Troye Sivan - Suburbia Tour (2016)
- Daya - Sit Still, Look Pretty Tour (2017)
