= Voctave =

American a cappella group

Voctave is an 11-member a cappella group based in Orlando, Florida, United States. The group often performs intricate arrangements of music from Broadway, Disney, jazz standards, and Christmas music. Among the unique characteristics which set the group apart from other a cappella groups is an extremely wide vocal range of 5 full octaves.

The group's arranger is Jamey Ray. His arrangements blend classical group choral techniques with pop. Tony De Rosa served as musical director for the group from its inception until he left the group in early 2020, along with J. C. Fullerton. De Rosa was replaced as musical director by Bradley Roberts, one of the vocal captains in the "Voices of Liberty" at Walt Disney World's EPCOT.

Drew Ochoa and Aaron Stratton joined the group shortly after the departure of De Rosa and Fullerton and recorded several YouTube videos with the group during the early months of the COVID-19 pandemic in the spring of 2020. They are also included on the group's latest album, The Corner of Broadway and Main Street, Volume 2, which peaked at #6 on the iTunes sales chart in its first week of sales.

On July 1, 2025, Stratton left the group to focus on his family and career at Walt Disney World.

== Early career ==
The group was informally created when Jamey Ray was recording an album of arrangements with a 12-member chorus. He recorded the group singing a collection of Disney music and posted it to YouTube. Based on the response and viewership, he organized a group of 11 singers to sing together at events independent of the Disney theme parks, at which nearly all of the members performed on a regular basis. In early 2016, the group released their Disney Love Medley featuring Kirstin Maldonado of Pentatonix and Jeremy Michael Lewis, her then-boyfriend. This video featured three songs about love (I See the Light from Tangled, You'll Be in My Heart from Tarzan, and Go the Distance from Hercules) and accumulated more than 30 million views as of December 2021.

Over the course of the next four years, Voctave released a self-titled album, numerous Christmas albums featuring both secular and religious music, two albums of the group performing with a symphony orchestra, and two spanning Broadway standards and Disney-themed arrangements.

== Discography ==
=== Albums ===
- The Spirit of the Season (2016)
- Voctave (2016)
- Snow (2017)
- The Corner of Broadway and Main Street (2017)
- Symphony Series (2019)
- Symphony Series – Christmas Edition (2019)
- Somewhere There's Music (2019)
- The Corner of Broadway and Main Street Vol. 2 (2020)
- The Spirit of the Season – Deluxe Edition (2021)
- Goodnight, My Someone (2022)
- It Feels Like Christmas (2023)
- The Corner of Broadway and Main Street Vol. 3 (2024)
- The Corner of Broadway and Main Street Vol. 4 (2026)

=== Singles ===
- This Is My Wish (2015)
- All is Well (2015)
- Disney Love Medley (2016) – featuring Kirstin Maldonado and Jeremy Michael Lewis
- Somewhere from The West Side Story (2023)
- On A Clear Day You Can See Forever (2024) - featuring Tituss Burgess
- To Love You More (2024) - featuring Marty Thomas
- I Am What I Am (2024) - featuring The Swingles

=== Other music ===
- Disney Halloween Mashup (2016) – Jon Cozart featuring Voctave
- Stampede from The Lion King (2016)
- A Million Dreams from The Greatest Showman (2018) – collaboration with Vocal Majority
- Star Spangled Banner (2018)
- Carol of the Bells (2020) – The Serenad3 featuring Voctave
- America the Beautiful (2022) – Charles Billingsley featuring Voctave
- Matilda Medley (2025) - Rachel Potter featuring Voctave, Jude Kroenung, and Cree Hasse

== Members ==
=== Current members ===
- Kate Lott – soprano 1
- Tiffany Coburn – soprano 2
- Ashley Espinoza – alto/soprano
- Sarah Whittemore – alto 1
- Chrystal Johnson – alto 2
- E.J. Cardona – tenor 1
- Drew Ochoa – tenor 2
- Jamey Ray – tenor, arranger
- Kurt Von Schmittou – baritone
- John Hannigan - baritone
- Karl Hudson – bass
- Bradley Roberts – musical director
