= On My Way Home Tour =

2015 concert tour by Pentatonix

- Tour by Pentatonix
- Associated albums: PTX, Vol. III; PTX
- Start date: February 25, 2015
- End date: June 16, 2015
- Legs: 3
- No. of shows: 54

Pentatonix concert chronology
- VIP Tour (2012–14); On My Way Home Tour (2015); Pentatonix World Tour (2016–17)

The On My Way Home Tour was the fourth headlining concert tour by American a cappella group Pentatonix to promote their EP PTX, Vol. III. The tour began on February 25, 2015, in Oakland, California, at the Fox Oakland Theatre, concluding on June 16, 2015, in Osaka, Japan, at Zepp Namba.

== Background and development ==
On December 7, 2014, Pentatonix announced the On My Way Home Tour.
On April 1, 2016, a documentary of the tour was released on DVD.

== Set list ==
This set list is representative of the show on February 25, 2015 in Oakland, California. It is not representative of all concerts for the duration of the tour.

1. "Problem" (Ariana Grande cover)
2. "Evolution of Beyoncé"
3. "Telephone" (Lady Gaga cover)
4. "La La Latch" (Naughty Boy and Disclosure mashup)
5. "Love You Long Time" (Jazmine Sullivan cover)
6. "Rather Be" (Clean Bandit cover)
7. "Julie-O" (Mark Summer cello cover from Kevin)
8. "Papaoutai" (Stromae cover)
9. "Aha!" (Imogen Heap cover)
10. "FourFiveSeconds" (Rihanna, Kanye West & Paul McCartney cover)
11. "Break Free" (Ariana Grande cover) / "See Through"
12. "Uptown Funk" (Mark Ronson & Bruno Mars cover)
13. "Let's Get It On" (Marvin Gaye cover)
14. "Evolution of Music"
15. "Standing By"
16. "On My Way Home"

Encore

17. "That's Christmas To Me"
18. "Daft Punk"

== Tour dates ==
List of concerts, showing date, city, country, venue, tickets sold, number of available tickets and amount of gross revenue
Date	City	Country	Venue	Attendance	Revenue
North America
February 25, 2015	Oakland	United States	Fox Oakland Theatre	5,600 / 5,600	$201,040
February 26, 2015	Oakland	United States	Fox Oakland Theatre	5,600 / 5,600	$201,040
February 28, 2015	Las Vegas	United States	Chelsea Ballroom	—	—
March 1, 2015	Anaheim	United States	City National Grove of Anaheim	1,700 / 1,700	$65,005
March 3, 2015	Orem	United States	Utah Valley University	—	—
March 7, 2015	Minneapolis	United States	Orpheum Theatre	2,561 / 2,561	$121,292
March 8, 2015	Chicago	United States	Chicago Theatre	6,978 / 6,978	$283,790
March 9, 2015	Chicago	United States	Chicago Theatre	6,978 / 6,978	$283,790
March 11, 2015	Toronto	Canada	Sound Academy	—	—
March 12, 2015	Toronto	Canada	Sound Academy	—	—
March 14, 2015	Atlantic City	United States	Borgata Event Center	—	—
March 15, 2015 (Note: The concert on March 15 at the Toyota Oakdale Theatre in Wallingford, Connecticut was live streamed through Yahoo Screen.)	Wallingford	United States	Toyota Oakdale Theatre	—	—
March 16, 2015	Boston	United States	Agganis Arena	5,999 / 5,999	$242,033
March 18, 2015	New York City	United States	The Theater at Madison Square Garden	5,341 / 5,341	$236,476
March 19, 2015	Fairfax	United States	Patriot Center	5,918 / 5,918	$243,807
March 21, 2015	Atlanta	United States	The Tabernacle	—	—
March 22, 2015	Tampa	United States	Busch Gardens	—	—
March 25, 2015	Houston	United States	Bayou Music Center	—	—
March 26, 2015	Austin	United States	Moody Theater	—	—
March 28, 2015	Tulsa	United States	Brady Theater	—	—
March 29, 2015	Grand Prairie	United States	Verizon Theatre	—	—
Europe
April 9, 2015	Lisbon	Portugal	Coliseu dos Recreios	—	—
April 11, 2015	Madrid	Spain	Sala San Miguel	—	—
April 12, 2015	Barcelona	Spain	Razzmatazz	—	—
April 14, 2015	Milan	Italy	Fabrique	—	—
April 15, 2015	Zürich	Switzerland	X-TRA	—	—
April 16, 2015	Vienna	Austria	Planet.tt Bank Austria Halle	—	—
April 18, 2015	Munich	Germany	Kulturhalle Zenith	—	—
April 19, 2015	Cologne	Germany	Palladium	—	—
April 20, 2015	Hamburg	Germany	Docks	—	—
April 22, 2015	Offenbach	Germany	Stadthalle Offenbach	—	—
April 23, 2015	Berlin	Germany	Columbiahalle	—	—
April 25, 2015	Paris	France	Zénith Paris	—	—
April 26, 2015	Brussels	Belgium	Forest National	3,918 / 4,000	$136,327
April 28, 2015	Amsterdam	Netherlands	Heineken Music Hall	—	—
April 29, 2015	Amsterdam	Netherlands	Heineken Music Hall	—	—
April 30, 2015	London	England	Eventim Apollo	—	—
May 2, 2015	Birmingham	England	O_{2} Academy Birmingham	—	—
May 3, 2015	Manchester	England	Manchester Academy	—	—
May 4, 2015	Leeds	England	O_{2} Academy Leeds	—	—
May 6, 2015	Glasgow	Scotland	O_{2} Academy Glasgow	—	—
Asia
May 28, 2015	Seoul	South Korea	Olympic Hall	—	—
May 30, 2015	Kuala Lumpur	Malaysia	Stadium Negara	—	—
June 1, 2015	Singapore		The Star Performing Arts Centre	—	—
June 3, 2015	Jakarta	Indonesia	Balai Kartini Expo	—	—
June 4, 2015	Jakarta	Indonesia	Istora Senayan	—	—
June 6, 2015	Quezon City	Philippines	Smart Araneta Coliseum	—	—
June 7, 2015	Cebu City	Philippines	Waterfront Cebu City Hotel & Casino	—	—
June 9, 2015	Tokyo	Japan	Zepp DiverCity	—	—
June 10, 2015	Tokyo	Japan	Zepp DiverCity	—	—
June 11, 2015	Tokyo	Japan	Zepp DiverCity	—	—
June 13, 2015	Nagoya	Japan	Zepp Nagoya	—	—
June 15, 2015	Fukuoka	Japan	Zepp Fukuoka	—	—
June 16, 2015	Osaka	Japan	Zepp Namba	—	—
Total				38,015 / 38,097 (99%)	$1,529,770

== Notes ==
Pentatonix member Kirstie was sick for part of this tour.
