= Mitch Grassi =

American singer (born 1992)

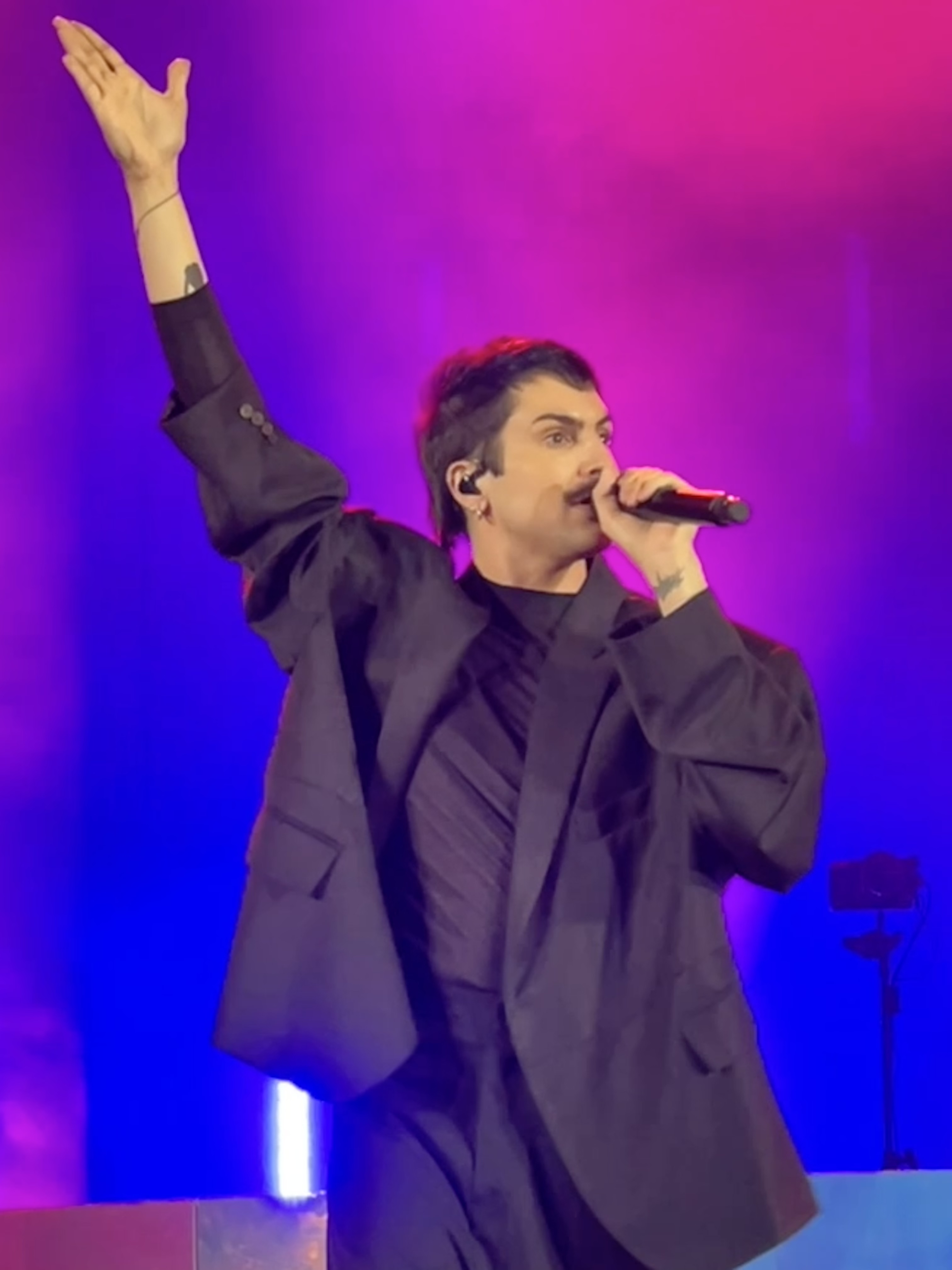
- Grassi performing with Pentatonix at the Hollywood Bowl in 2022

Background information
- Also known as: Messer
- Born: Mitchell Coby Michael Grassi; July 24, 1992 (age 34); Arlington, Texas, U.S.
- Genres: A cappella; pop; electronic
- Occupations: Singer; songwriter
- Years active: 2002–present
- Labels: RCA, Madison Gate
- Member of: Pentatonix; Superfruit
- Website: messer.page

Mitchell Coby Michael Grassi (born July 24, 1992) is an American singer, songwriter, YouTuber, and countertenor vocalist from Arlington, Texas. Known for his high tenor voice, Grassi came to international attention as a founding performer in two groups—the a cappella quintet Pentatonix, and the duo Superfruit with Pentatonix bandmate Scott Hoying. As of September 2023, Pentatonix has released eleven albums (two of which have been number ones) and six EPs, have had five songs in the Billboard Hot 100, and won three Grammy Awards as "the first a cappella group to achieve mainstream success in the modern market". As of September 2023, Superfruit's YouTube channel has over 2.4 million subscribers and has accumulated over 483 million views.

In April 2020, Grassi debuted a solo moniker, Messer, doing a DJ set of "a range of dark, techno tunes" at Paper's Club Quarantine Zoom event during the COVID-19 pandemic. "Machine" was released as Messer's debut single in July 2021, with "Angels Pray" following later that month. Messer's debut EP Roses was released August 2021.

== Early life and education ==
Grassi was born July 24, 1992, in Arlington, Texas, to Nel Grassi (née Fenton) and Michael (Mike) Grassi, a native of Hornell, New York. He is of half Italian and half a mix of Scottish, Irish and Welsh descent. His parents relocated to the Dallas–Fort Worth, Texas, area in the mid-1980s for Michael's career in the airline industry. Grassi has an older sister, Jessa, and remembers doing singalongs to pop tunes and Christmas songs in homemade variety shows with her for his parents when he was very young. His uncle Tony was also "a high tenor and had an incredible range".

He met Scott Hoying, another co-founder of Pentatonix, and his partner in the duo Superfruit, when he was young. He also met Kirstin Maldonado, another Pentatonix founder, when he was nine or ten and they were both doing musical theater. Grassi and Hoying were both active in theater arts in Arlington and met when they were cast in the musical Annie; they both also play piano. They were "giggly" together but not best friends immediately; they then were split up being sent to different schools for a year and a half, and reunited while performing in Charlie and the Chocolate Factory. Though both were still closeted at the time, they feel they had a subconscious connection, as well as their musical theater interests; Grassi's favorite Broadway musical is Rent. When he was fourteen, Grassi knew he wanted to be a singer and musician, "I want to enrich others' lives with the music I make, because that's what music did for me all my life."

When Grassi was seventeen, he was inspired by Lady Gaga when she came out as part of the LGBTQ community, and admires her sense of self expression, "That was something I'd always yearned to do because I had always been the weird kid—I always had something, I always wanted to make a point and I always wanted to be an individual." Grassi briefly dated Hoying at their "arts-oriented" Martin High School; both openly gay, they remain best friends.

Pentatonix started as a trio, as Grassi, Hoying, and Maldonado had been in choir for most of their high school careers. Grassi and Maldonado also did community theater together as well. The three quickly put together an a cappella cover of Lady Gaga's 2010 "Telephone" featuring Beyoncé to compete in a local radio station contest to meet Glee cast members. They did not win but kept competing and performing, gaining notoriety.

Hoying heard about The Sing-Off reality-show competition for a cappella acts; he gained an interest in the genre once in college. It was the first time the three really embraced a cappella. The show required groups to have five or more members, so they recruited bass vocalist Avi Kaplan and singer/beat boxer Kevin Olusola. Grassi skipped high school graduation to audition for 2011's The Sing Off. After they won, all relocated to Los Angeles to pursue recording artist careers. The main goal of the group was to become the first modern mainstream a cappella group, which they have done.

== Pentatonix ==
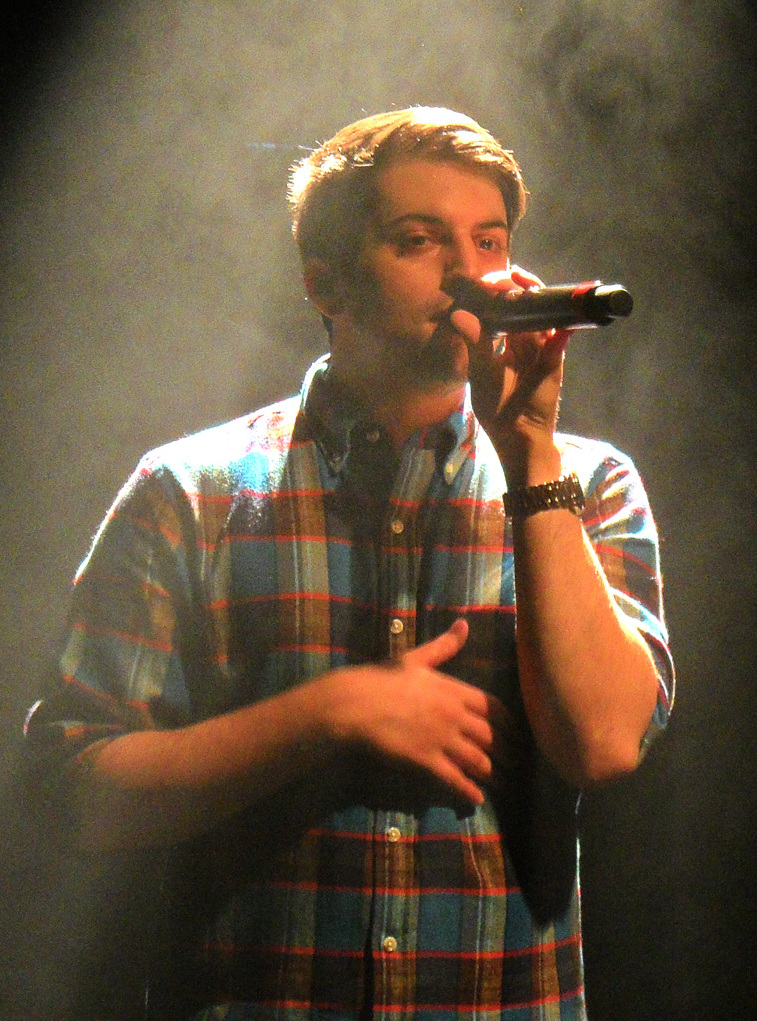
Grassi in 2013

Pentatonix is a quintet a cappella collective, with most of their songs being covers, and much of their success comes from touring, including internationally. They gained national attention in the U.S. competing on NBC's a cappella reality show The Sing-Off in 2011, which they won. The group got a record label, who dropped them as their audience was too niche—with no guarantee of selling albums, or concert tickets—but Grassi felt it was ultimately advantageous as around late 2012 Pentatonix started posting videos to YouTube building an international fan base. (Note: Having Epic drop them from the label also opened the path for their manager to get them out of their reality show contract.) Pentatonix also released the debut EP, PTX, Volume 1, on their new label in June 2012, followed by a Christmas EP, PTXmas in November. They recorded covers of pop 40 hits like Gotye's "Somebody That I Used to Know" (2011), Psy's "Gangnam Style" (2012), and Fun's "We Are Young" (2011). Their big video hit was a November 2013 video doing a medley of Daft Punk songs, it had ten million views in the first week of its release and rose to over 150 million views; as of January 2020 it has over 320 million views.

As of March 2015 they had 7.6 million YouTube subscribers, that rose to seventeen million as of October 2019; with over three billion video views. As of February 2020, they had over 4.4 billion views; they also have two million followers on Instagram, and 3.6 million on Facebook.

They continually release YouTube videos, with nearly every one with more than a million views. They also tour extensively including across North America, Europe, Asia, and Latin America—over an estimated forty countries as of December 2016; and have had cameos in shows and movies like Bones and Pitch Perfect 2 (2015); and their own television show, A Pentatonix Christmas Special (2016).

As of June 2021, Pentatonix has released eleven albums, ten of which reached the Top Ten on the Billboard 200, all combined selling ten million albums—including two number one albums, and five of Christmas music—and have had four songs in the Billboard Hot 100, and won three Grammy Awards. Their three Grammy wins were for their: Daft Punk medley tribute to the French electronic music duo (2015); version of Pyotr Ilyich Tchaikovsky's "Dance of the Sugar Plum Fairy" (2016); Jolene collaboration with Dolly Parton (2017). In addition to their regular tours, they use their extensive holiday music for Christmastime tours. Their That's Christmas to Me (2014) is the highest-charting Christmas album by a group of two or more since 1962.

The individual members find inspiration to cover recent songs, as well as international classics, then if they decide as a group it is a good match, they compose an arrangement; their friend Ben Bram, who is also their producer, is their co-arranger. Grassi is influenced by electronic music; his dream mentor, and single biggest influence is Imogen Heap. Although they are known for their covers and re-arranged popular songs, the band released their first album, Pentatonix, in October 2015, and it was all original music; it also marked the first time an a cappella group had the top album on the Billboard 200 album chart. Their sold-out North American tour that year was documented in the movie, On My Way Home. Grassi noted he and Hoying both being openly gay has been appreciated by the group's fans; a common demographic is midwesterners and Christians who comment that the pair have helped them accept their LGBTQ children.

== Superfruit ==
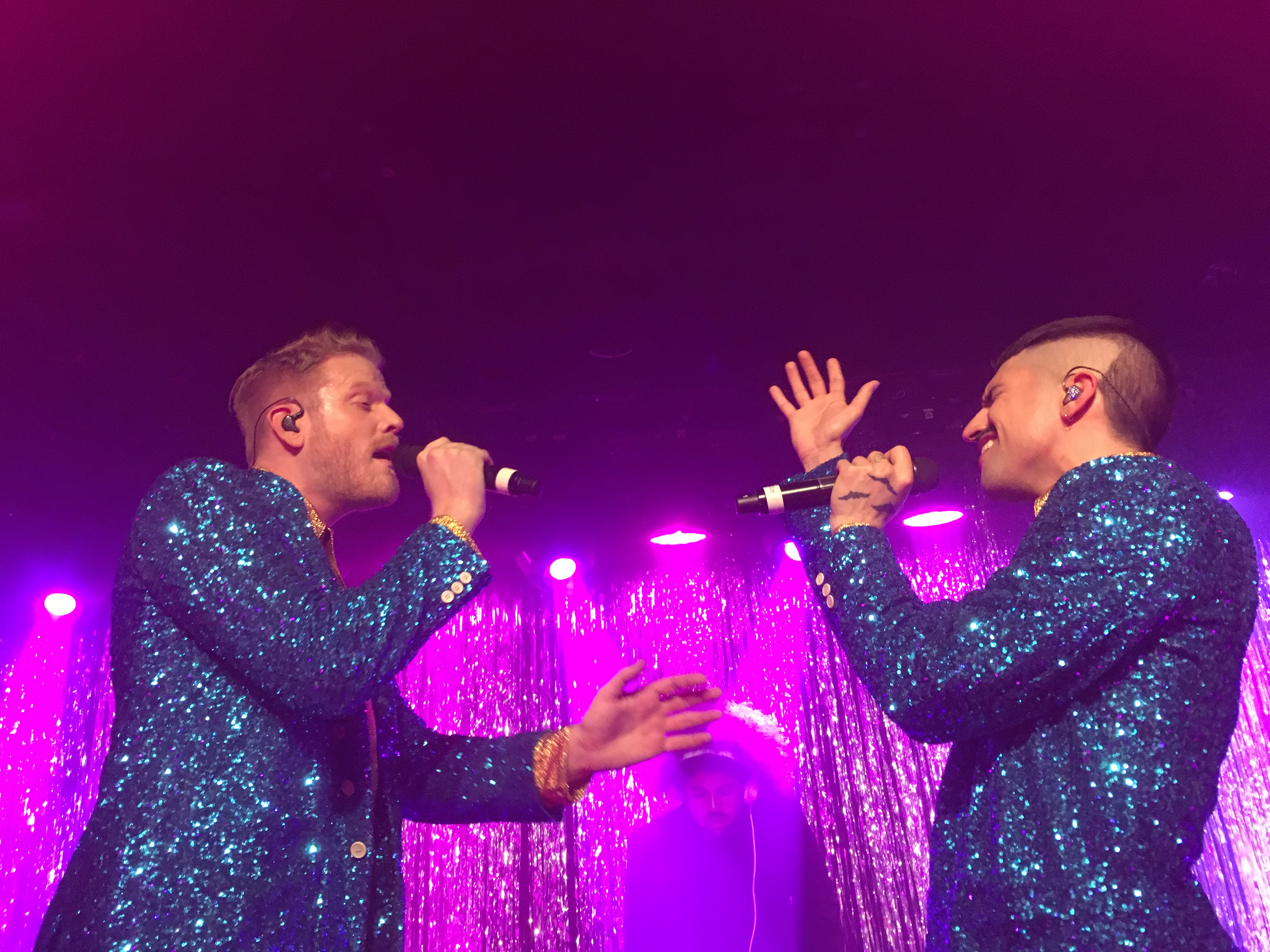
Superfruit's Scott Hoying (left) and Mitch Grassi (right) at their first live concert in Los Angeles, CA

Grassi and Scott Hoying, lifelong friends, vlogged skits, comedy videos, and duets to YouTube quickly gaining a following; after hundreds of videos they saw the music ones were the most liked so created Superfruit. Some of their viral videos include: Frozen medley (with more than thirteen million views as of April 2016) ; an "Evolution of Miley Cyrus" (12.8 million) and a Beyoncé album medley (with over twelve million). According to Hoying, Superfruit "came from Mitch's random mind". Hoying noted, "Our first rule with starting Superfruit was: This is for fun, ... This is to be free and do whatever we want. So, let's write stories that we want to write, let's make videos that we want to make, let's not put limitations on it. And not care so much about calculating it to where we think it might be more successful ... And I think that's why it feels so good to the fans." The first Superfruit video was released on August 13, 2013. Navigating Pentatonix versus the duo's projects and touring schedules was simplified by the quintet's rule that the larger groups' commitments come first.

They started to incorporate original music into the project, starting in 2016. Superfruit's first EP, Future Friends, Part One, was released in June 2017, Part Two in September 2017, followed by a full-length album of the same name. The EP's concept is that a friendship can run even deeper than any romantic component. They wrote with songwriters and producers collaborators including Robopop, Justin Tranter, and John Hill; and produced videos for each song. The album won critical acclaim and rose to ninth place on the Billboard 200 album chart.

Superfruit's debut video for Future Friends, "Imaginary Parties", was noted by InStyle for the bold fashions that their stylist Candice McAndrews helped them secure. McAndrews has worked with Pentatonix since the beginning as well. She used Gucci and Balenciaga to elevate with high-fashion inspiration and "a pop art approach to their look". Grassi wears ninety percent women's clothing, and is enthusiastic to express a more feminine side; he feels "clothing is genderless. It's all about expression and feeling and the art of it." McAndrews shared that a Superfruit fitting will have seven to nine racks of clothing for each, including designers "Alexander Wang, Loewe, Vetements, Haider Ackermann, Raf Simons, and Maison Margiela".

== Messer ==
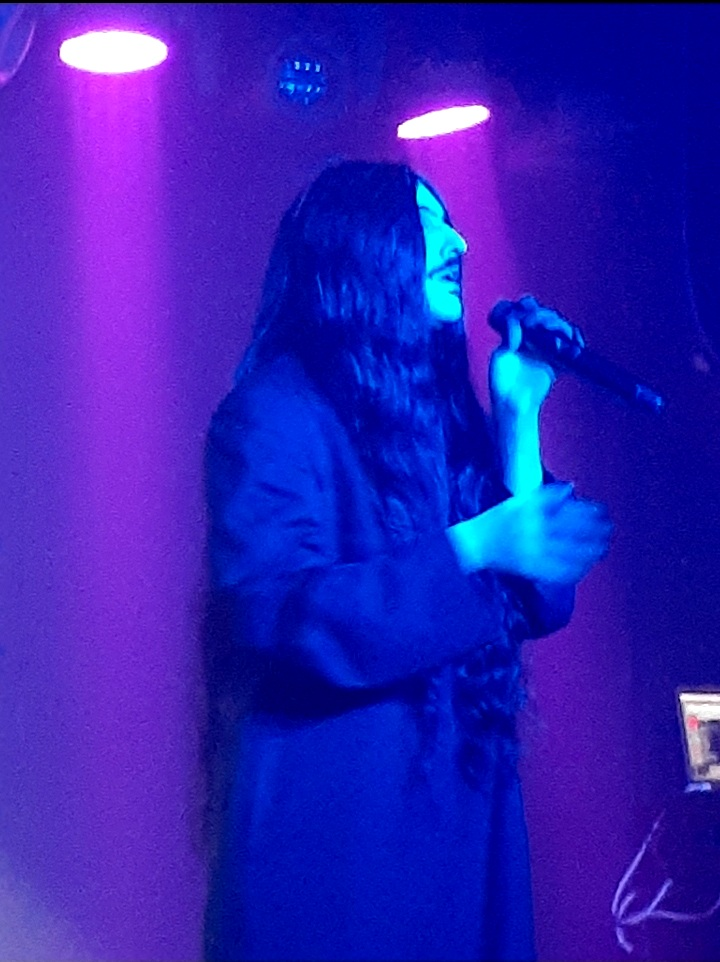
Mitch Grassi performing as Messer at the Moroccan Lounge on January 14, 2023.

In April 2020, Paper announced that Grassi would be debuting his solo project, Messer, at a Club Quarantine Zoom event during the COVID-19 (coronavirus) pandemic. This initial online outing of Messer was a DJ set of "dark, techno tunes" but Grassi would later release solo music under the same moniker. The following year, Messer was featured on "READY2DIE," the twelfth track on Jimmy Edgar's Cheetah Bend album. Pitchfork praised the "exhilarating, euphoric counterweight" lent to the track by Messer's vocal performance.

August 2021 saw the release of an EP, Roses. Self-released under the label-name Schwingungen, Roses features 5 songs, including the singles "Machine" and "Angels Pray". Four of the tracks were cowritten and coproduced with alexmaax (Max Hershenow) while the title track was cowritten and produced with Naomi MacPherson of MUNA. A remix by Planningtorock of "Boy in the Pictures" (the third track on Roses) was released on October 25, 2021, along with the b-side, "Love Supply," a Messer original co-written with Xander Rushie. The 2022 single, "Leather," again co-written with Rushie along with Austin Macedo, was highlighted by Frontview Magazine as a departure from Messer's previous releases moving towards " a more sensual and r&b-inspired sound."

On January 14, 2023, Messer had his debut live show at the Moroccan Lounge in LA. This concert was originally scheduled for October 2022 but was postponed due to illness.

On June 23, 2025, Messer announced the release of his new album, Cuts, for July 18 of the same year. On January 23, 2026, a vinyl pressing of Cuts was released for the first time.

== Public appearance ==
Grassi has become known for being fashion forward and adventurous; he feels "self expression, especially through fashion is so important" for him. He explains he has a "totally avant garde interest in art, fashion and music", and a duality with Pentatonix to respect the business and fan base at the same time. He is inspired by "late '80s, early '90s", and interested in vintage Martin Margiela, a Belgian fashion designer; and Demna Gvasalia, designer and creative director of Balenciaga and Vetements. He is known for playing with gender expression, such as by wearing a dress and heels.

== Personal life ==
Grassi is gay; Out readers voted him the second-most eligible gay bachelor behind Adam Lambert in 2017. As of 2016, Grassi lives in Hollywood, California. In 2023, Grassi began dating his current partner and fiancé after meeting in Berlin, Germany. After dating long-distance for over a year, Grassi decided to move temporarily to Berlin in late 2024, describing his living conditions as "half-and-half" between Los Angeles and Berlin. On October 17th 2025, Grassi publicly shared his engagement to his partner.

== Discography ==
=== Messer ===
List of studio albums, with selected information
Title	Details
Cuts	Released: July 18, 2025; Label: Schwingungen (self released); Formats: Digital download, streaming

List of extended plays, with selected information
Title	Details
Roses	Released: August 27, 2021; Label: Schwingungen (self released); Formats: Digital download, streaming

List of singles
Title	Year	Album
"Machine"	2021	Roses
"Angels Pray"	2021	Roses
"Boy in the Pictures Remix" (Planningtosurrender version) by Planningtorock / "Love Supply"	2021	Non-album single and B-side
"Leather"	2022	Non-album singles
"Oblivion"	2023	Non-album singles
"Velvet"	2023	Non-album singles
"Agony"	2023	Non-album singles
"Halfway"	2023	Non-album singles
"Not Yet"	2025	Cuts

As featured artist
Title	Year	Artist	Album
"Ready2Die" (featuring Messer)	2021	Jimmy Edgar	Cheetah Bend
"Parachute" (featuring Messer)	2025	Alexmaax	Parachute
"In the Cold" (featuring Mitch Grassi)	2025	Acceptance	Phantoms Twenty

=== Superfruit ===
List of studio albums, with selected information
Title	Details	Peak chart positions	
Title	Details	US	CAN
Future Friends	Released: September 15, 2017; Label: RCA; Formats: CD, digital download, streaming	29	70

== Filmography ==
=== Television ===
Year	Title	Role	Notes
2016	Bones	Julian Klein	Guest Cast (The Strike in the Chord; Season 11 Ep.16)

=== Film ===
Year	Title	Role	Notes
2015	Pitch Perfect 2	Himself	As part of a Pentatonix cameo in the film
2015	Pentatonix: On My Way Home	Himself	Documentary detailing the experiences of the group on their tour of the same name.
2022	Pentatonix: Around the World for the Holidays	Himself	The film accompanied their album titled "Holidays Around the World"
2023	Candy Cane Lane	Caroler	Side characters
2024	Meet Me Next Christmas	Himself	As a member of Pentatonix

== Awards and nominations ==
World Choreography Awards
Year	Category	Work	Result	Ref.
2017	Best Choreography in a Music Video	Sweet Life	Won	

Daytime Emmy Awards
Year	Category	Work	Result	Ref.
2017	Outstanding Musical Performance in a Daytime Program	"God Rest Ye Merry Gentlemen" on Rachael Ray	Nominated	

Grammy Awards
Year	Category	Work	Result	Ref.
2015	Best Arrangement, Instrumental or A Cappella	"Daft Punk"	Won	
2016	Best Arrangement, Instrumental or A Cappella	"Dance of the Sugar Plum Fairy"	Won	
2017	Best Country Duo/Group Performance	"Jolene" (ft. Dolly Parton)	Won	
2023	Best Traditional Pop Vocal Album	Evergreen	Nominated	
2024	Best Traditional Pop Vocal Album	Holidays Around the World	Nominated	

Streamy Awards
Year	Category	Work	Result	Ref.
2014	Best Cover Song	"Daft Punk"	Won	
2014	Best Original Song	"Love Again"	Won	
2014	Best Musical Artist	Pentatonix	Nominated	
2015	Best Collaboration	Pentatonix and Lindsey Stirling	Nominated	
2015	Best Cover Song	"Evolution of Michael Jackson"	Nominated	

YouTube Music Awards
Year	Category	Work	Result	Ref.
2013	Response of the Year	"Radioactive" (with Lindsey Stirling)	Won	
2015	Artist of the Year	Pentatonix	Won	

Shorty Awards
Year	Category	Work	Result	Ref.
2015	Best YouTube Musician	Pentatonix	Won	

Billboard Music Awards
Year	Category	Work	Result	Ref.
2015	Top Billboard 200 Album	That's Christmas to Me	Nominated	
2015	Top Billboard 200 Artist	Pentatonix	Nominated	

Nickelodeon Kids' Choice Awards
Year	Category	Work	Result	Ref.
2016	Favorite Music Group	Pentatonix	Nominated	
2017	Favorite Music Group	Pentatonix	Nominated	

IHeartRadio Music Awards
Year	Category	Work	Result	Ref.
2016	Best Cover Song	"Cheerleader"	Nominated	

Webby Awards
Year	Category	Work	Result	Ref.
2016	Video Remixes/Mashups	Evolution of Michael Jackson	Nominated	
