= PTX, Volume 1 =

PTX Volume 1

EP by Pentatonix
- Released: June 26, 2012
- Genre: A cappella
- Length: 22:51
- Label: Madison Gate
- Producer: Ben Bram

Pentatonix chronology
| PTX Volume 1 (2012) | PTXmas (2012) |

PTX, Volume 1 is the debut extended play album by the a cappella group Pentatonix. It was released on June 26, 2012.

== Conception and development ==
After winning the title of champion in the reality show The Sing-Off, Pentatonix was signed to a record label, enabling them to pursue their goal of a musical career. The group promoted their then-upcoming EP through YouTube videos with covers of pop songs such as "Somebody That I Used to Know" by Gotye featuring Kimbra, "Gangnam Style" by PSY, and "We Are Young" by Fun, which went viral.

== Reception ==
The Gizzle Review gave the EP four stars out of five, praising the group by saying, "these new [cover song] versions are exquisite - filled with tight harmonies, impressive riffing and plenty of vocal bells and whistles." However, they also pointed out that, "This EP doesn't have the same variety of material as the group presented on The Sing Off (admittedly consisting of themed rounds)." hoping for more variety in future albums. Alt Rock Live gave a score of 9 out of 10: "Pentatonix brings so much energy into their music along with intense talent and creativity. Their sound is a little futuristic while staying firmly rooted in modern pop rock."

In 2013, the Contemporary A Cappella Society awarded the album with Best Pop/Rock Album, Best Pop/Rock Song for "Starships", and Best Soul/R&B Song for "The Baddest Girl".

Professional ratings
Review scores
| Source | Rating |
|---|---|
| The Gizzle Review | 4/5 stars |
| Alt Rock Live | 9/10 |

=== Commercial performance ===
The album peaked at number 14 in the US Billboard 200 chart and number 5 on the digital chart selling 20,000 copies in its first week of release. It also peaked at number 2 on the US Billboard Top Independent Albums chart making it Madison Gate Records' highest charting release to date.

== Track listing ==
| No. | Title | Writer(s) | Original Artist | Length |
|---|---|---|---|---|
| 1. | "Starships" | Onika Maraj, Nadir Khayat, Rami Yacoub, Carl Falk, Wayne Hector | Nicki Minaj | 3:01 |
| 2. | "The Baddest Girl" | Scott Hoying | Pentatonix | 3:49 |
| 3. | "Somebody That I Used to Know" | Wally de Backer, Luiz Bonfá | Gotye featuring Kimbra | 3:19 |
| 4. | "Aha!" | Imogen Jennifer Jane Heap | Imogen Heap | 2:37 |
| 5. | "Show You How to Love" | Avi Kaplan, Kevin Olusola | Pentatonix | 3:53 |
| 6. | "Love You Long Time" | Salaam Remi, Jazmine Sullivan | Jazmine Sullivan | 3:05 |
| 7. | "We Are Young" | Nate Ruess, Andrew Dost, Jack Antonoff, Jeffrey Bhasker | fun. featuring Janelle Monáe | 3:07 |

== Personnel ==
Pentatonix

- Mitch Grassi - tenor lead and backing vocals
- Scott Hoying - baritone lead and backing vocals
- Kirstin Maldonado - alto lead and backing vocals
- Avi Kaplan - vocal bass, bass lead and backing vocals
- Kevin Olusola - vocal percussion and backing vocals

Production

- Ben Bram - production

== Charts ==
Chart performance
| Chart (2012) | Peak position |
|---|---|
| Canadian Albums (Nielsen SoundScan) | 96 |
| US Billboard 200 | 14 |
| US Independent Albums (Billboard) | 2 |
