= PTX (album) =

Studio album by Pentatonix
- Released: September 19, 2014
- Recorded: 2012–2014
- Genre: A cappella
- Length: 53:26
- Label: RCA

Pentatonix chronology
PTX, Vols. 1 & 2 (2014)	PTX (2014)	PTX, Vol. III (2014)

PTX is the second studio album by American a cappella band Pentatonix. Released on 19 September 2014 via RCA Records, the work contains songs from PTX Volumes 1 & 2, cover songs from YouTube and seven new Pentatonix songs.

== Track listing ==
PTX — Physical edition
No.	Title	Writer(s)	Original Artist	Length
1.	"Daft Punk"	Thomas Bangalter, Guy-Manuel de Homem-Christo	Daft Punk	4:08
2.	"Problem"	Max Martin; Savan Kotecha; Ilya Salmanzadeh; Amethyst Kelly; Ariana Grande	Ariana Grande featuring Iggy Azalea	2:28
3.	"On My Way Home"	Jordan Johnson; Sam Martin; Marcus Lomax; Jason Evigan; Stefan Johnson; Clarence Coffee; Guy Berryman; Chris Martin; Will Champion; Jonny Buckland	Pentatonix	3:15
4.	"La La Latch"	James Murray; Shahid Khan; James Napier; Mustafa Omer; Jonathan Coffer; Al-Hakam El Kaubaisy; Frobisher Mbabazi; Sam Smith; Guy Lawrence; Howard Lawrence	Naughty Boy/Disclosure featuring Sam Smith [respectively]	3:41
5.	"Rather Be"	James Napier; Jack Patterson; Grace Chatto; Nicole Marshall	Clean Bandit featuring Jess Glynne	3:32
6.	"See Through"	Kerli Kõiv; Thomas Kirjonen; Joonas Angeria	Pentatonix	3:18
7.	"Papaoutai" (featuring Lindsey Stirling)	Paul Van Haver	Stromae	3:32
8.	"Standing By"	Pentatonix	Pentatonix	4:09
9.	"Can't Hold Us"	Macklemore; Ryan Lewis	Macklemore, Ryan Lewis	3:17
10.	"Hey Momma / Hit the Road Jack"	Kevin Olusola; Percy Mayfield	Pentatonix / Percy Mayfield [respectively]	3:01
11.	"Royals"	Ella Yelich O'Connor; Joel Little	Lorde	3:50
12.	"I Need Your Love"	Calvin Harris, Ellie Goulding	Calvin Harris	2:49
13.	"Natural Disaster"	Pentatonix	Pentatonix	3:29
14.	"Say Something"	Ian Axel; Chad King; Mike Campbell	A Great Big World featuring Christina Aguilera	4:31
15.	"Run to You"	Pentatonix; Ben Bram	Pentatonix	4:25
Total length:				53:26

PTX — iTunes edition (bonus tracks)
No.	Title	Writer(s)	Original Artist	Length
16.	"Somebody That I Used to Know"	Wally de Backer; Luiz Bonfá	Gotye featuring Kimbra	3:19
17.	"Radioactive" (featuring Lindsey Stirling)	Ben McKee; Dan Platzman; Dan Reynolds; Wayne Sermon; Alexander Grant; Josh Mosser	Imagine Dragons	3:46
Total length:				60:34

== Charts ==
Chart (2014)	Peak position
Austrian Albums (Ö3 Austria)	20
French Albums (SNEP)	94
German Albums (GfK Entertainment)	34
Swiss Albums (Swiss Hitparade)	27
