= 2015 YouTube Music Awards =

- Date: March 23, 2015
- Location: online /YTMA
- Hosted by: Tyler Oakley

Television/radio coverage
- Network: YouTube

The 2015 YouTube Music Awards is the second ceremony for YouTube Music Awards. The inaugural 2013 ceremony was met with mixed reception. In November 2014, YouTube announced its intentions to reinvent the purpose of the award show. Additionally, the site announced there will be no live ceremony for the awards. YouTuber Tyler Oakley hosted the awards presentation.

== Background and announcement ==
In 2013, the inaugural YTMAs experienced mixed to negative reception due to technical difficulties, as well as having most of its award winners originate from mainstream music, rather than YouTube itself. Additionally, the director and hosts of the award show, were not allowed to rehearse prior to the ceremony's filming in a New York City warehouse at Pier 36. In 2014, no award ceremony was held. Instead, toward the end of the year, YouTube announced there would be an award ceremony held in March 2015. On March 12, 2015, YouTube released an official video announcing that the show will be held on March 23.

YouTube tweaked the purpose of the awards, however, as they shifted from honoring, "artists and songs that YouTube fans have turned into global hits over the past year," to, "recognize the biggest and emerging artists to watch on YouTube in 2015." Additionally, the setting of the ceremony was announced to no longer be presented in the form of a live show. Instead, for one day in March 2015, the website will spotlight music videos as, "music will be the headline act on YouTube." Although differences in the presentation format and purpose of the awards were announced, Kia Motors and VICE Media maintained their status as sponsors of the YTMAs.

== Performances ==
Artist	Song
Charli XCX	"Famous"
Action Bronson; Chance the Rapper	"Baby Blue"
Cahoots; Roomie	"No Money"
FKA twigs	"Glass & Patron"
Kygo; Parson James	"Stole the Show"
Lindsey Stirling	"Take Flight"
Martin Garrix; Usher	"Don't Look Down"
Max Schneider; Hoodie Allen	"Gibberish"
Migos	"One Time"
Megan Nicole	"Escape"
Nicky Jam; Enrique Iglesias	"El Perdon"
Shamir	"Call It Off"

== Winners ==
On March 2, 2015, YouTube released an official video announcing the winners.

- 2NE1
- alt-J
- Ariana Grande
- Beyoncé
- Big Bang
- Big Sean
- Brad Paisley
- Charli XCX
- Dej Loaf
- Drake
- Ed Sheeran
- Ella Henderson
- Fifth Harmony
- FKA Twigs
- Florida Georgia Line
- George Ezra
- Hoodie Allen
- Hozier
- Hunter Hayes
- J. Cole
- Jason Derulo
- Katy Perry
- Kendrick Lamar
- Kiesza
- Kurt Hugo Schneider
- Lady Gaga
- Lindsey Stirling
- Martin Garrix
- Max Schneider
- Megan Nicole
- Meghan Trainor
- Migos
- Miley Cyrus
- Nicki Minaj
- Nicky Jam
- OK Go
- One Direction
- Pentatonix
- Pharrell Williams
- Rihanna
- Sam Smith
- Sia
- Snoop Dogg
- Taylor Swift
- The Weeknd
- Tinashe
- Tori Kelly
- Tove Lo
- Troye Sivan
- Tyler Ward
