= Kirstin Maldonado =

American singer-songwriter (born 1992)

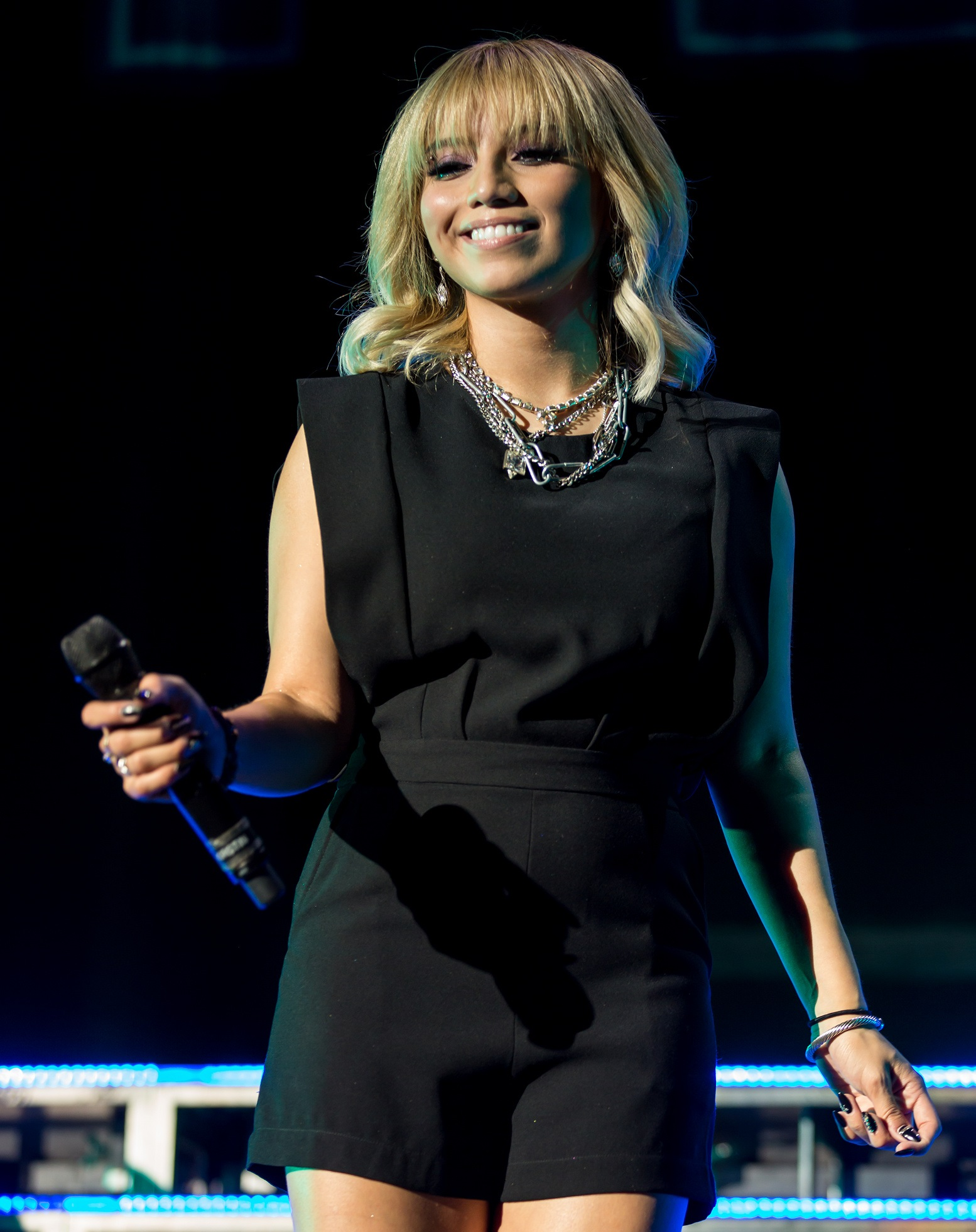
- Maldonado performing in August 2015
- Born: Kirstin Taylor Maldonado; May 16, 1992 (age 34); Fort Worth, Texas, U.S.
- Other names: Kirstin™, Kirstie Maldonado
- Education: Martin High School; University of Oklahoma
- Occupations: Singer; songwriter; actress
- Years active: 2011–present
- Spouse: Ben Hausdorff (m. 2024)
- Children: 2
- Parents: Michael Cisneros (father); Angelica Maldonado (mother)
- Musical career
- Origin: Arlington, Texas, U.S.
- Genres: A cappella; pop
- Labels: RCA; Madison Gate
- Member of: Pentatonix
- Website: kirstinmaldonado.tumblr.com

Kirstin Taylor Maldonado (born May 16, 1992) is an American singer-songwriter and actress. She is known for being a vocalist in the a cappella group Pentatonix. With the group, she has released seven studio albums, won three Grammy Awards, and sold over six million albums.

Maldonado released her debut solo single "Break a Little" on May 19, 2017, under the name Kirstin™. (Note: Stylized as kırstın™; the trademark symbol, in this case, stands for "Taylor Maldonado".) Her first extended play, Love, (Note: Stylized as L O V E.) was released on July 14, 2017. Maldonado made her Broadway debut in 2018 in the musical Kinky Boots.

== Early life and education ==
Kirstin Taylor Maldonado was born in Fort Worth, Texas, on May 16, 1992. Her mother, Angelica Maldonado, is of Spanish and Italian descent, while her father, Michael Cisneros, is of Mexican descent. She was raised by her mother in Arlington, Texas. She was only five years old when she first expressed her wish to become a singer. At eight years old, she sang at her mother's wedding reception, ultimately convincing her mother to enroll her in voice lessons. She also got into theater and starred in several local productions. It was through the local theater community that Maldonado met Mitch Grassi, a future fellow Pentatonix member.

Maldonado attended Holy Rosary Catholic School, and later Martin High School. At Martin High School, she met Scott Hoying with whom she and Grassi would later form Pentatonix. The three friends created an a cappella trio and started getting attention around their school for their covers of popular songs. She graduated from Martin High School in 2010 and attended the University of Oklahoma, where she studied musical theatre on a full-ride scholarship as a National Hispanic Scholar. During her time in college, she joined Kappa Kappa Gamma. She left before completing her degree to form Pentatonix.

== Career ==
=== Pentatonix ===
In 2011, Maldonado was contacted by her high school friend Scott Hoying who wanted to put together a group for NBC's a cappella competition The Sing-Off. Maldonado agreed to join the group, which also included Mitch Grassi, another of her high school friends. Together they formed the a cappella group Pentatonix along with Avi Kaplan and Kevin Olusola. The group entered and eventually won the third season of The Sing-Off. Since then, they have released several albums and EPs, reached 13 million YouTube subscribers and over 2 billion YouTube views, and toured the world. On February 8, 2015, Pentatonix won their first Grammy for Best Arrangement, Instrumental or A Cappella for their Daft Punk medley. On February 15, 2016, Pentatonix won their second Grammy in the same category for their rendition of "Dance of the Sugar Plum Fairy" which was featured on their holiday album, That's Christmas to Me. On February 12, 2017, Pentatonix won their third Grammy for Best Country Duo/Group Performance for their cover of "Jolene" which featured Dolly Parton.

=== Solo projects and appearances ===
In January 2016, Maldonado performed the song "Somewhere Over the Rainbow" at the World Dog Awards in honor of the dogs who have played the role of Toto from the iconic story about The Wizard of Oz.

In February 2016, the a cappella group Voctave released the video "Disney Love Medley" which featured Maldonado and her then-fiancé Jeremy Lewis. In the video, Maldonado and Lewis perform the songs "I See the Light" from Tangled, "You'll Be in My Heart" from Tarzan and "Go the Distance" from Hercules with the members of Voctave providing the backing vocals. In May 2016, Maldonado, along with Grassi and Hoying, appeared in an episode of Bones.

On May 19, 2017, Maldonado released her first solo single, "Break a Little". Her debut EP, L O V E, was released on July 14, 2017. The EP debuted at #1 on the iTunes Pop Albums Chart. In 2018, Maldonado made her Broadway debut, portraying Lauren in the musical Kinky Boots alongside singer Jake Shears and comedian Wayne Brady.

== Personal life ==
Maldonado met singer and entrepreneur Jeremy Lewis in August 2013 through The Sing-Off, and they started dating two months later. Lewis proposed to her on May 29, 2016, in Paris during the Pentatonix World Tour. The couple called off their wedding and ended their relationship in October 2017; they had been planning to marry in December of the same year.

While Pentatonix was on tour throughout 2018, Maldonado entered a professional and personal relationship with filmmaker Ben Hausdorff. They got engaged in March 2023 in Tokyo, and were married on April 21, 2024, in McKinney, Texas. Maldonado and Hausdorff have two children together: a daughter (born on June 28, 2022) and a son (born on March 2, 2025).

== Discography ==
All credits adapted from Apple Music and Spotify.

=== As lead artist ===
==== Singles ====
Year	Title	Album	Writer(s)	Producer(s)
2017	"Got the Feeling" (Syn Cole feat. Kirstin)	Non-album singles	Camila Purcelle, Grace Barker, Rene Pais, Steve Robson	Syn Cole, LYRE
2017	"Hey Guapo" (Play-N-Skillz & Kirstin)	Non-album singles	William Yanez, Cody Tarpley, David Macias, Emmanuel Anene, Juan Salinas, Omar Tavarez, Oscar Salinas, Viktoria Hansen	Play-N-Skillz
2017	"All Night"	Love	David Pramik, Charlie Snyder, Kirstin Maldonado	David Pramik, Charlie Snyder
2017	"Break A Little"	Love	David Pramik, Charlie Snyder, Kirstin Maldonado	David Pramik
2017	"Dose of You" (Helena Legend and Kirstin)	Non-album single	Helena Atherton, Kirstin Maldonado	Helena Legend, Niko The Kid, Throttle, LYRE

==== Extended plays ====
Title	Details
Love	Released: July 14, 2017; Label: RCA Records; Format: Digital download, streaming; Track listing: 1. "Break A Little"; 2. "All Night"; 3. "Something Real"; 4. "See It"; 5. "Naked"; 6. "Bad Weather"

== Awards and nominations ==
Daytime Emmy Awards
Year	Category	Work	Result	Ref.
2017	Outstanding Musical Performance in a Daytime Program	"God Rest Ye Merry Gentlemen" on Rachael Ray	Nominated	

Grammy Awards
Year	Category	Work	Result	Ref.
2015	Best Arrangement, Instrumental or A Cappella	"Daft Punk"	Won	
2016	Best Arrangement, Instrumental or A Cappella	"Dance of the Sugar Plum Fairy"	Won	
2017	Best Country Duo/Group Performance	"Jolene" (ft. Dolly Parton)	Won	
2023	Best Traditional Pop Vocal Album	Evergreen	Nominated	
2024	Best Traditional Pop Vocal Album	Holidays Around the World	Nominated	

Streamy Awards
Year	Category	Work	Result	Ref.
2014	Best Cover Song	"Daft Punk"	Won	
2014	Best Original Song	"Love Again"	Nominated	
2014	Best Musical Artist	Pentatonix	Nominated	
2015	Best Collaboration	Pentatonix and Lindsey Stirling	Nominated	
2015	Best Cover Song	"Evolution of Michael Jackson"	Nominated	

YouTube Music Awards
Year	Category	Work	Result	Ref.
2013	Response of the Year	"Radioactive" (with Lindsey Stirling)	Won	
2015	Artist of the Year	Pentatonix	Won	

Shorty Awards
Year	Category	Work	Result	Ref.
2015	Best YouTube Musician	Pentatonix	Won	

Billboard Music Awards
Year	Category	Work	Result	Ref.
2015	Top Billboard 200 Album	That's Christmas to Me	Nominated	
2015	Top Billboard 200 Artist	Pentatonix	Nominated	

Nickelodeon Kids' Choice Awards
Year	Category	Work	Result	Ref.
2016	Favorite Music Group	Pentatonix	Nominated	
2017	Favorite Music Group	Pentatonix	Nominated	

IHeartRadio Music Awards
Year	Category	Work	Result	Ref.
2016	Best Cover Song	"Cheerleader"	Nominated	

Webby Awards
Year	Category	Work	Result	Ref.
2016	Video Remixes/Mashups	Evolution of Michael Jackson	Nominated	
