= PTXmas =

EP by Pentatonix
- Released: November 12, 2012
- Recorded: 2012
- Genre: A cappella; Christmas
- Length: 20:51
- Label: Madison Gate
- Producer: Ben Bram

Pentatonix chronology
PTX, Volume 1 (2012)	PTXmas (2012)	PTX, Vol. II (2013)

PTXmas is the second extended play and the first Christmas-themed recording by American a cappella group Pentatonix. The album was digitally released on November 12, 2012, and physical versions were available from November 13, 2012. The deluxe edition was released on November 19, 2013, with two additional tracks.

The deluxe version of PTXmas was the sixth highest-selling Christmas album of 2013, with 168,000 copies sold during the holiday season. As of October 23, 2015, PTXmas has sold 385,719 copies.

== Track listing ==
No.	Title	Writer(s)	Length
1.	"Angels We Have Heard on High"	Traditional	3:41
2.	"O Come, O Come Emmanuel"	Traditional	3:35
3.	"Carol of the Bells"	Peter J. Wilhousky, Mykola Leontovych	3:13
4.	"The Christmas Song (Chestnuts Roasting on an Open Fire)"	Mel Tormé, Robert Wells	3:43
5.	"O Holy Night"	Traditional	2:25
6.	"This Christmas"	Donny Hathaway, Nadine McKinnor	4:23
Total length:			21:00

Deluxe edition bonus tracks
No.	Title	Writer(s)	Length
7.	"Little Drummer Boy"	Harry Simeone, Henry Onorati, Katherine Kennicott Davis	4:15
8.	"Go Tell It on the Mountain"	Traditional	3:03
Total length:			28:18

== Charts ==
=== Weekly charts ===
Chart (2013–14)	Peak position
Australian Albums (ARIA)	78
Austrian Albums (Ö3 Austria)	36
New Zealand Albums (RMNZ)	35
US Billboard 200	7
US Digital Albums (Billboard)	1
US Independent Albums (Billboard)	5
US Top Holiday Albums (Billboard)	3

=== Year-end charts ===
Chart (2014)	Position
US Billboard 200	119
US Billboard Catalog Albums	8
Chart (2015)	Position
US Billboard 200	194
US Billboard Catalog Albums	15
Chart (2016)	Position
US Billboard Catalog Albums	40

== Certifications ==
Region	Certification	Certified units/sales
Canada (Music Canada)	Gold	40,000^{‡}
United States (RIAA)	Gold	500,000^{‡}
^{‡} Sales+streaming figures based on certification alone.
