= Kevin Olusola =

American singer-songwriter, beatboxer, and cellist (born 1988)

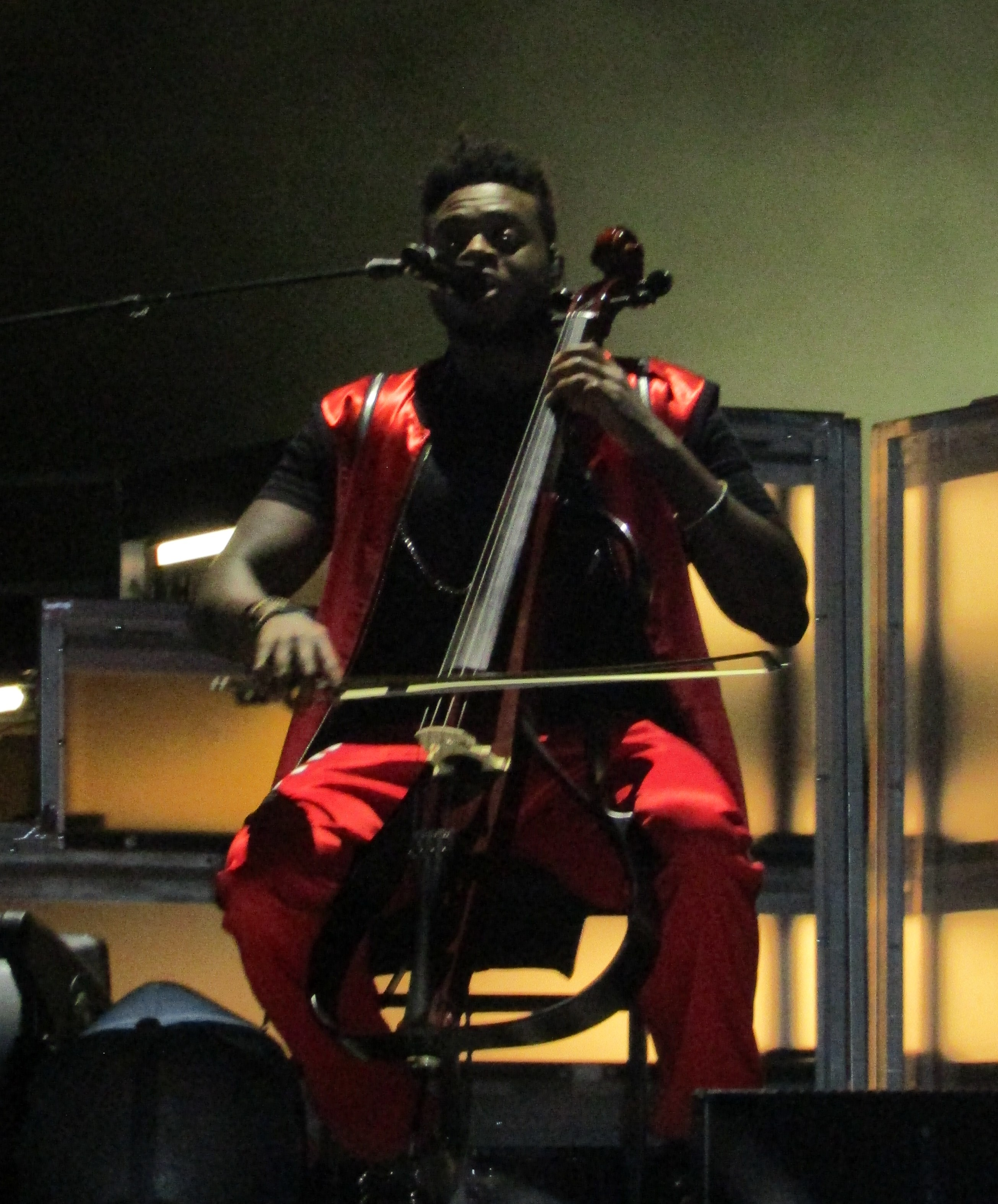
- Kevin Olusola playing the cello at a Pentatonix concert at the USANA Amphitheatre
- Born: Kevin Oluwole Olusola; October 5, 1988 (age 38); Pasadena, California, U.S.
- Other name: K.O.
- Education: Yale University (BA)
- Occupations: Singer-songwriter; beatboxer; cellist; record producer; rapper
- Years active: 2011–present
- Spouse: Leigh Weissman (m. 2019)
- Children: 2
- Musical career
- Genres: Classical; pop; rock; jazz; a cappella
- Instruments: Beatboxing; cello; piano; saxophone; vocals
- Labels: Madison Gate, RCA
- Member of: Pentatonix, Triptyq
- Website: kevinolusola.com

Kevin Oluwole Olusola, also known as K.O., (born October 5, 1988) is an American singer-songwriter, beatboxer, and cellist. Olusola is best known as the beatboxer of the a cappella group Pentatonix. After the group won NBC's The Sing-Off in 2011, they released eleven albums, which have sold over 2 million copies, and have amassed more than two billion views on their YouTube channel.

Olusola has also been identified as developing the art of "celloboxing" (playing cello and beatboxing simultaneously). His celloboxing version of Mark Summer's "Julie-O" went viral in April 2011, which led him to become involved with Pentatonix. Olusola has performed at classical musical festivals such as the Amsterdam Cello Biennale and the Kronberg Academy Festival, opened the TED Conference in Vancouver, and was chosen by Quincy Jones to represent him in concert at the 2012 Montreux Jazz Festival on the same program as Bobby McFerrin and Chick Corea.

== Early life and education ==
Olusola was born in Pasadena, California, to Nigerian-born Oluwole Olusola, a psychiatrist, and Grenadian-born Curline Paul, a nurse. At that time, his father had just come from medical school in Nigeria and an internship in Trinidad and Tobago to Loma Linda University, where he met his wife while she was doing her MPH. After they married, they moved to Hershey, Pennsylvania (where Kevin's sister Candace was born) for a short period of time, and then to Philadelphia, Pennsylvania, for his father to finish residency at Albert Einstein Medical Center (where Kevin's brother Kellon was born). Olusola started his education at Greater Philadelphia Junior Academy, but his family eventually moved to Owensboro, Kentucky, where he was raised. He attended the Triplett School, a Montessori-based school, for a short period of time before his parents transferred him to the Owensboro Public Schools, where he went to Sutton Elementary School for their accelerated math program that allowed him to take precalculus starting in the 9th grade. He decided to enroll at Phillips Academy Andover for 11th grade (upper year).

Olusola says that Andover taught him to have a strong work ethic, tenacity, and discipline. He went from an average student to a high honors student in his senior year. He was involved in community service (directing a music program for elementary string students) and Spanish-speaking activities, where he led the Spanish language table and went to Costa Rica for four weeks to study Spanish. After graduating from Andover, Olusola chose to attend Yale University.

At Yale, Olusola planned to pursue medicine and finished all his pre-med requirements. He started as an academic music major, but decided to switch to East Asian Studies after being introduced to China through a 10-day Chinese government sponsored trip for 100 Yale students. He lived in Beijing for 6 months through a PKU-Yale joint program during his second year, and then took a leave of absence during the 2009–2010 academic school year on Yale's Light Fellowship to study intensive Chinese at the Inter-University Program for Chinese Language Study in Beijing. In school, Olusola was the Director of Communications for a Rhodes Scholar-led non-profit called College Outreach, and he worked as a book monitor in the Yale Law School library and as a practice room monitor at the Yale School of Music. He graduated from Yale in 2011.

== Musical career ==
=== 1988–2010: Career beginnings ===
Olusola's parents discovered his musical talent when he was six months old and decided to put him in music lessons. He started the piano at age 4, the cello at age 6, and alto saxophone at age 10. He was heavily involved in music programs throughout grade school at Owensboro, Kentucky, in school and the community participating in jazz band, marching band, concert band, orchestra, and community youth orchestra. When Olusola was 12 years old, he was selected as the principal saxophonist of the United States Collegiate Wind Band and toured Europe during the summer for three weeks. He was also the principal cellist of the Kentucky State Youth Orchestra and received the highest honor at the Kentucky Governor's School for the Arts. He soloed and performed in a piano trio at Carnegie Hall as the winner of the American Fine Arts Festival, and soloed a second time on alto saxophone for PBS’s special "From the Top at Carnegie Hall".

While at Yale, Olusola was one of the principal cellists of the Yale Symphony Orchestra and participated in chamber music. It was during his junior year when he started thinking about music as a career when, that previous summer in Beijing, he began working on "celloboxing". One of his teachers at a Harvard summer intensive Chinese program suggested that he should try combining the two abilities. He won runner-up in Yo-Yo Ma’s "Celebrate and Collaborate With Yo-Yo Ma" competition (Ma said Olusola's version of Dona Nobis Pacem was "inventive and unexpected") and opened for KRS-One at Southern Connecticut State University. Olusola says that, during that spring break, his pre-med mentor C. Brandon Ogbunu (who was an MD/PhD student at Yale at the time) helped him to make the decision to finally go into music, saying medicine would always be there. After a summer of neurobiology research at Yale, Olusola moved to Beijing for his academic year of Chinese study and continuously honed his celloboxing skills. He started uploading celloboxing covers to his YouTube channel and performed for Ambassador Jon Huntsman, Jr. at his residence, and on Beijing Television with Li Yu Gang and Chong’er (Chinese beatboxer). He also met KorElement, an American rapper in Beijing, and they did covers on YouTube, in addition to performing together at the American Pavilion for the 2010 Shanghai World Expo.

=== 2010–present: Pentatonix ===
After Olusola's academic stint in China, he spent the summer in Beijing working on his celloboxing version of Mark Summer's "Julie-O" the summer of 2010 while living in a Chinese friend's apartment as a way to begin expanding his skills. He continued working on it throughout the year and decided to audition to music schools with it. He ultimately decided to enroll in the Berklee College of Music. During his spring semester of senior year, Olusola (along with YouTube sensation Sam Tsui) was nominated for a graduation-day prize and videotaped "Julie-O" with the help of YouTube star and Yale alum Jake Bruene. Olusola posted the video on April 14, 2011, and by the second week, the video had reached number 6 on Reddit, and had become a viral video on the Internet, garnering national and international acclaim.

At the time the video was going viral, Olusola was contacted by Scott Hoying who was impressed by his musicality and beatboxing skills. Hoying was forming a group with Kirstin Maldonado, Mitch Grassi, and Avi Kaplan to compete in season three of NBC’s The Sing-Off and he wanted Olusola to join. The second weekend after Olusola graduated from college, he met the group the day before the audition, and Pentatonix was born. After the taping of the show, Olusola did a brief stint as the cellist for Gungor on the David Crowder Band "7" Tour before returning with Pentatonix for the season finale. The group won the Sing-Off title on November 28, 2011, which landed them a recording contract with Sony Music Entertainment and a $200K cash prize. The band immediately moved to Los Angeles to record their first album with producer Ben Bram, whom they met on the show. Their first EP, PTX, Volume 1, was released on June 26, 2012, charting at No. 14 in the US Billboard 200 chart and No. 5 on the digital chart. It sold 20,000 copies in its first week of release. They embarked on a fall 2012 tour and released their Christmas EP, PTXmas, on November 13, 2012.

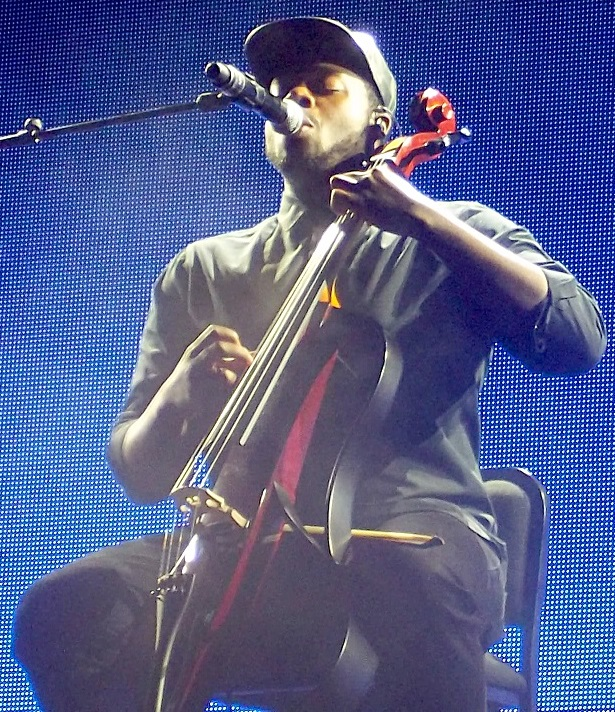
Olusola performing with Pentatonix in 2015

After their winter–spring 2013 tour, Pentatonix returned to the studio to finish their second EP, PTX, Vol. II. Olusola became more interested in songwriting and production, especially with how stomping and clapping could be used as an effective production tool for bolstering their a cappella tracks. Olusola co-wrote four of the songs on the album, Natural Disaster, Love Again, Hey Momma/Hit the Road Jack and Run to You. The album was released on November 5, 2013, and debuted at number ten on the Billboard 200 and number one on the Independent charts, selling 31,000 copies in the first week. The Christmas album was re-released on November 19, 2013, additionally labeled the "Deluxe Edition", and contained two additional tracks. One of these, The Little Drummer Boy, charted in several Billboard categories including peaking at number two on the "Streaming Songs" chart and number one on the "Holiday 100" chart. It became the fourth-highest charting holiday song on the Hot 100 in Billboard history. Pentatonix signed a deal with RCA Records after finishing their third US tour and their second European tour in 2014, and have finished and released their self-titled album. Olusola also released a solo EP in early 2015, titled The Renegade EP. It charted No. 1 on Billboard Classical Albums Chart and Apple iTunes Classical Chart.

On February 8, 2015, Pentatonix won their first Grammy for Best Arrangement, Instrumental or A Cappella for their Daft Punk medley. On February 15, 2016, Pentatonix won their second Grammy in the same category for their rendition of "Dance of the Sugar Plum Fairy", which was featured on their holiday album, That's Christmas to Me. On February 12, 2017, Pentatonix won their third Grammy for Best Country Duo/Group Performance for their cover of "Jolene", which featured Dolly Parton.

== Personal life ==
Olusola is a Seventh-day Adventist, and is fluent in Mandarin Chinese. He started dating college admissions consultant Leigh Weissman in 2017 after they met through a mutual friend. They were married on September 19, 2019, in a two-day, multicultural wedding ceremony held in Simi Valley, California. Olusola and Weissman have two children together: a daughter (born on April 3, 2021) and a son (born in June 2024).
