= Christmas Is Here! =

Studio album by Pentatonix
- Released: October 26, 2018
- Recorded: 2017–2018
- Genres: A cappella; Christmas
- Length: 32:40
- Label: RCA
- Producers: Scott Hoying; Mitch Grassi; Kirstie Maldonado; Matt Sallee; Kevin Olusola; Thaddis "Kuk" Harrell; Martin Johnson; Ed Boyer; Drew Pearson; Ben Bram

Pentatonix chronology
PTX Presents: Top Pop, Vol. I (2018)	Christmas Is Here! (2018)	The Best of Pentatonix Christmas (2019)

Christmas Is Here! is the seventh studio album by American a cappella group Pentatonix. It is also their third full-length holiday album following A Pentatonix Christmas in 2016.

It was released on RCA Records, and the first single is a cover of "Making Christmas" from The Nightmare Before Christmas. Pentatonix promoted the album through a tour of the same name, which started in November 2018 at The Theatre at Grand Prairie.

== Reception ==
Chuck Campbell of the Knoxville News Sentinel rated the album four out of five stars.

== Track listing ==
Unless otherwise noted, Information is taken from the album's Liner Notes

No.	Title	Writer(s)	Lead vocals	Length
1.	"What Christmas Means to Me"	Allen Story, Anna Gordy Gaye, George Gordy	Scott Hoying, Kirstin Maldonado, Mitch Grassi	2:54
2.	"Rockin' Around the Christmas Tree" (Brenda Lee cover)	Johnny Marks	Hoying, Maldonado, Matt Sallee	2:07
3.	"It's Beginning to Look a Lot Like Christmas"	Meredith Willson	Maldonado, Hoying, Grassi	2:23
4.	"Grown-Up Christmas List" (featuring Kelly Clarkson; Amy Grant cover (Note: The song was originally performed by composer Foster, but was popularized by Grant, who added a new verse she wrote for her cover. The Pentatonix version is a cover of Grant's, featuring her additional verse.))	Lyrics: Linda Thompson, Grant / Music: David Foster	Clarkson	4:41
5.	"Greensleeves (Interlude) (Note: Kevin Olusola is not featured on the track.)"	Traditional; Arranged by Pentatonix & Ben Bram	Pentatonix	0:59
6.	"Sweater Weather" (The Neighbourhood cover)	Jesse Rutherford, Zachary Abels, Jeremy Freedman	Sallee, Hoying, Grassi	3:22
7.	"When You Believe" (featuring Maren Morris; from The Prince of Egypt)	Stephen L. Schwartz, Kenneth "Babyface" Edmonds	Morris, Hoying	3:52
8.	"Waltz of the Flowers" (from The Nutcracker)	Pyotr Ilyich Tchaikovsky; Arranged by Pentatonix & Ben Bram	Pentatonix	2:00
9.	"Here Comes Santa Claus" (Gene Autry cover)	Gene Autry, Oakley Halderman	Maldonado, Hoying, Sallee	2:36
10.	"Making Christmas" (from The Nightmare Before Christmas)	Danny Elfman	Hoying, Maldonado, Grassi	2:12
11.	"Where Are You, Christmas?" (from How the Grinch Stole Christmas)	Mariah Carey, James Horner, Will Jennings	Grassi, Maldonado, Hoying	3:30
12.	"Jingle Bells" (with Orchestra; Barbra Streisand cover (Note: While the song is a traditional Christmas Carol, the Pentatonix version is based on the Barbra Streisand recording, which was arranged by Jack Gold and Marty Paich))	James S. Pierpont; Adapted by Pentatonix & Ben Bram	Maldonado, Grassi	1:55
Total length:				32:40

Christmas Is Here! — Remixes bonus tracks
No.	Title	Length
13.	"It's Beginning to Look a Lot Like Christmas" (Cutmore Remix)	3:47
14.	"It's Beginning to a Lot Like Christmas" (Country Club Martini Crew Remix)	3:35
15.	"It's Beginning to Look a Lot Like Christmas" (Country Club Martini Crew Pop Remix)	2:51
16.	"When You Believe" (Black Stereo Faith Underground Mix)	5:15
17.	"When You Believe" (Dave Aude Remix)	3:56
18.	"When You Believe" (John "J-C" Carr Remix)	3:35
Total length:		54:38

Track listing adapted from Billboard and iTunes.

== Personnel ==
Unless otherwise noted, Information is taken from the album's Liner Notes
Pentatonix

- Scott Hoying – producer, baritone lead, backing vocals and co-vocal bass in "Here Comes Santa Claus"
- Mitch Grassi – producer, tenor lead and backing vocals
- Kirstin Maldonado – producer, alto lead and backing vocals
- Matt Sallee – producer, vocal bass, bass lead and backing vocals
- Kevin Olusola – producer, vocal percussion, backing vocals, vocal flugelhorn on "Rockin' Around the Christmas Tree"

Others

- Ed Boyer - audio mixing
- Ben Bram - producer, recording engineer
- RaVaughn Brown - choir vocals (1, 7)
- Busbee - Maren Morris' vocal producer on "When You Believe"
- Kelly Clarkson - guest vocals on "My Grown-Up Christmas List"
- Deonis Cook - choir vocals (1, 7)
- Jack Gold - musical arrangement on "Jingle Bells"
- Jason Halbert - vocal producer on "My Grown-Up Christmas List"
- Kerri Lawson - choir vocals (1, 7)
- Maren Morris - guest vocals on "When You Believe"
- Sean O'Loughlin - conductor, orchestration on "Jingle Bells"
- Orchestra Members - various instruments on "Jingle Bells"
- Marty Paich - musical arrangement on "Jingle Bells"
- Tiffany Palmer - choir vocals (1, 7)
- Chelsea West - choir vocals (1, 7)
- Brandon Winbush - choir vocals (1, 7)

== Charts ==
=== Weekly charts ===
Chart (2018)	Peak position
Australian Albums (ARIA)	100
Austrian Albums (Ö3 Austria)	27
Belgian Albums (Ultratop Flanders)	139
Canadian Albums (Billboard)	18
Dutch Albums (Album Top 100)	119
Japanese Albums (Oricon)	94
US Billboard 200	7
US Top Holiday Albums (Billboard)	1

=== Year-end charts ===
Chart (2019)	Position
US Billboard 200	176

== See also ==
- List of Billboard Top Holiday Albums number ones of the 2010s
