= List of Billboard Top Holiday Albums number ones of the 2010s =

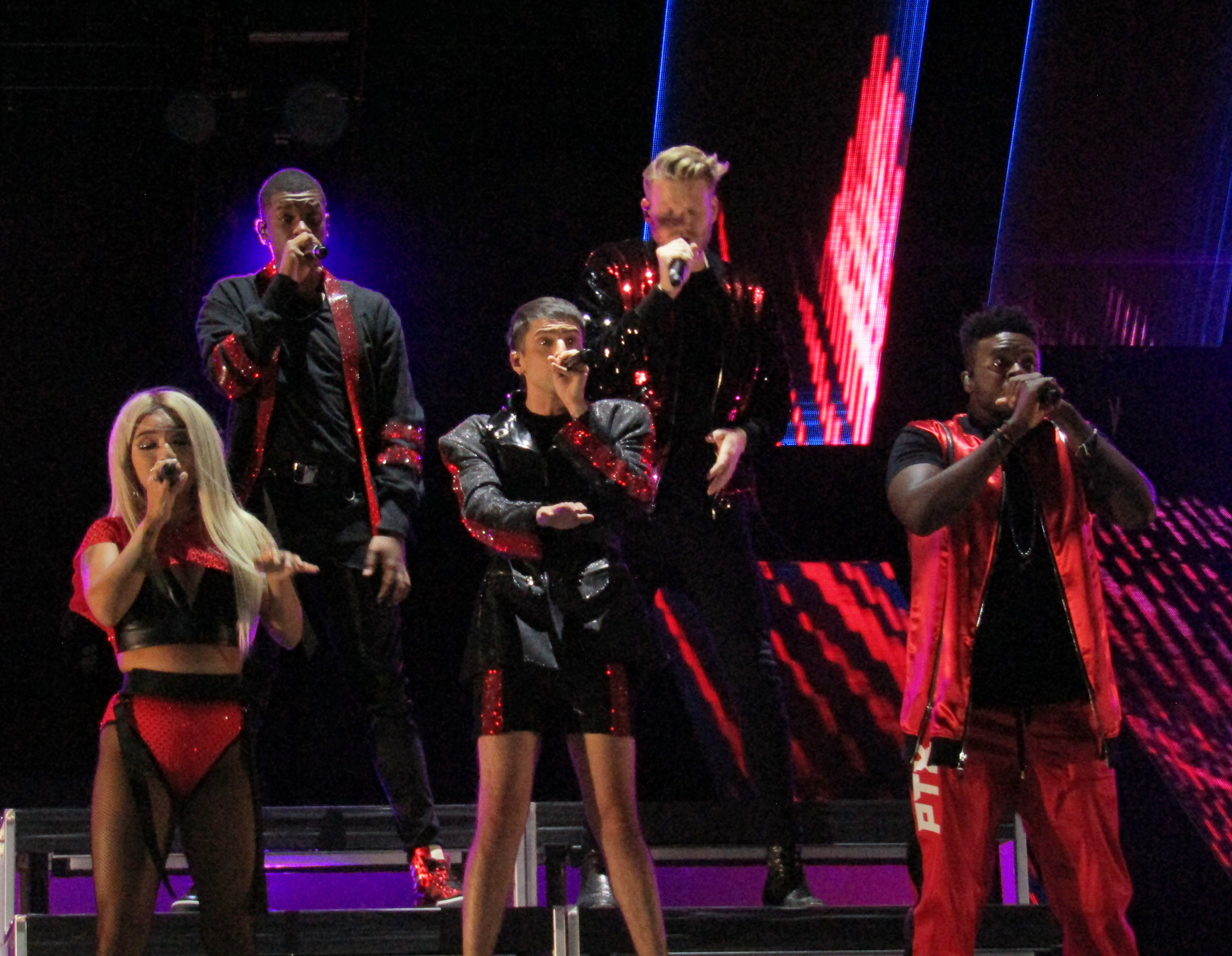
Pentatonix achieved four number ones spread across 40 non-consecutive weeks on Billboard's Top Holiday Albums chart.

The Top Holiday Albums chart is a seasonal chart published weekly by Billboard during October, November, December, and January. It tracks the best-selling holiday albums in the United States. Throughout the 2010s, many albums, compilation albums, extended plays, and soundtrack albums reached the top spot of the chart. Italian opera singer and songwriter Andrea Bocelli received the first number one of the 2010s with his album My Christmas (2009).

Several artists collected multiple number one albums during the decade. Lady Antebellum first visited the top of the chart with their EP A Merry Little Christmas in 2010, and returned with their fourth studio album, On This Winter's Night, in 2012. American a cappella group Pentatonix scored four number ones with That's Christmas to Me (2014), A Pentatonix Christmas (2016), Christmas Is Here! (2018), and The Best of Pentatonix Christmas (2019), totaling 40 non-consecutive weeks at the chart's summit. That's Christmas to Me and A Pentatonix Christmas accounted for 18 weeks at the top each, with the former album occupying the top position for 10 of the 12 weeks during the 2014-2015 holiday season. Pentatonix has sold over 4.5 million holiday albums in the US, as of December 2019. Mariah Carey's Merry Christmas II You debuted at the top spot in November 2010, while her first holiday album Merry Christmas (1994) reached number one in November 2019 following the release of its deluxe edition. Because of Carey's surge in popularity during the holiday season, she is often referred to by publications as the "Queen of Christmas".

The soundtrack to the 1993 film The Nightmare Before Christmas reached the top spot several times throughout the decade, with a special edition release of album also reaching number one in 2015. Scottish singer Susan Boyle released her second studio album, The Gift, in 2010 to commercial success, simultaneously topping both the Top Holiday Albums and the main all-genre Billboard 200 chart. It went on to sell 3.7 million copies during the 2010–2011 season. In 2013, Duck the Halls: A Robertson Family Christmas, an album performed by the cast of the American reality television series Duck Dynasty, reached the top of the chart for five non-consecutive weeks. It also reached number one on Billboard's Top Country Albums, selling 138,000 copies in its first four weeks. American singer Reba McEntire previously appeared on the Top Holiday Albums chart in 1994 and 2000, but achieved her first number one on the chart with My Kind of Christmas in 2016. Several of the albums on the list, including Carey's Merry Christmas, Michael Bublé's Christmas (2011), and Celine Dion's These Are Special Times (1998), are among the best-selling holiday albums of all time in the US.

== Chart history ==
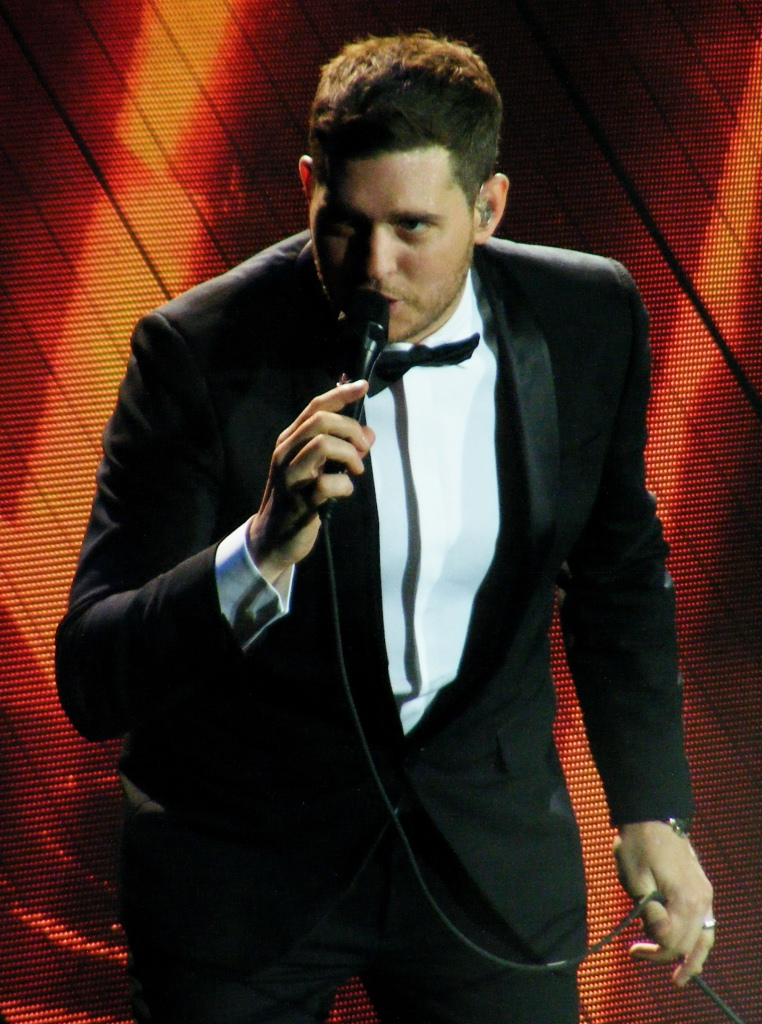
Canadian singer Michael Bublé's 2011 album Christmas was among the best performing releases of the decade.

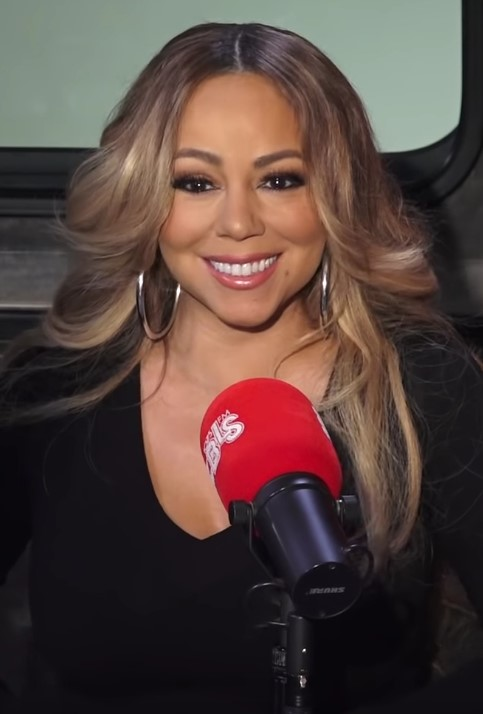
Both of Mariah Carey's holiday albums (1994's Merry Christmas and 2010's follow-up Merry Christmas II You) reached the top spot in the 2010s decade.

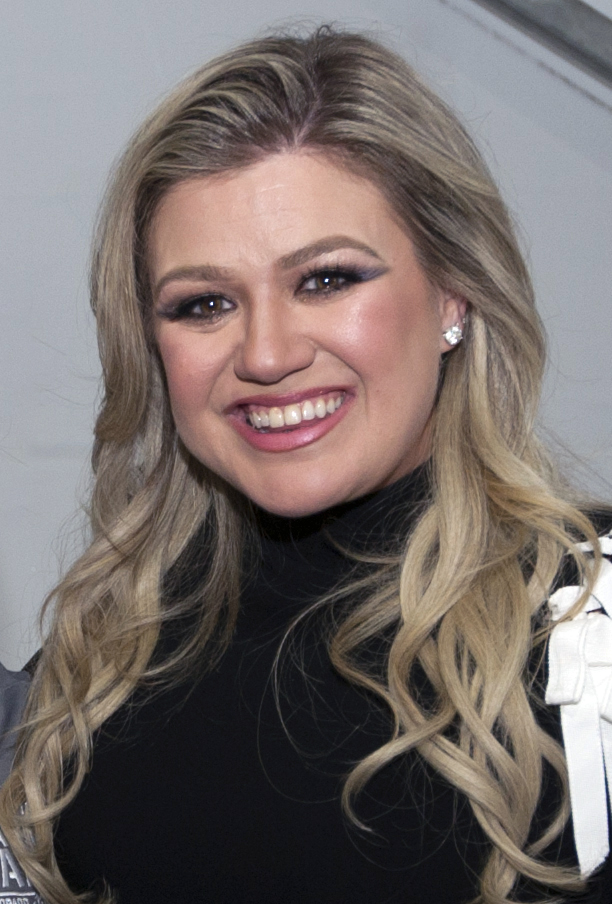
Kelly Clarkson's sixth studio album, Wrapped in Red (2013), spent three weeks at the chart's summit.

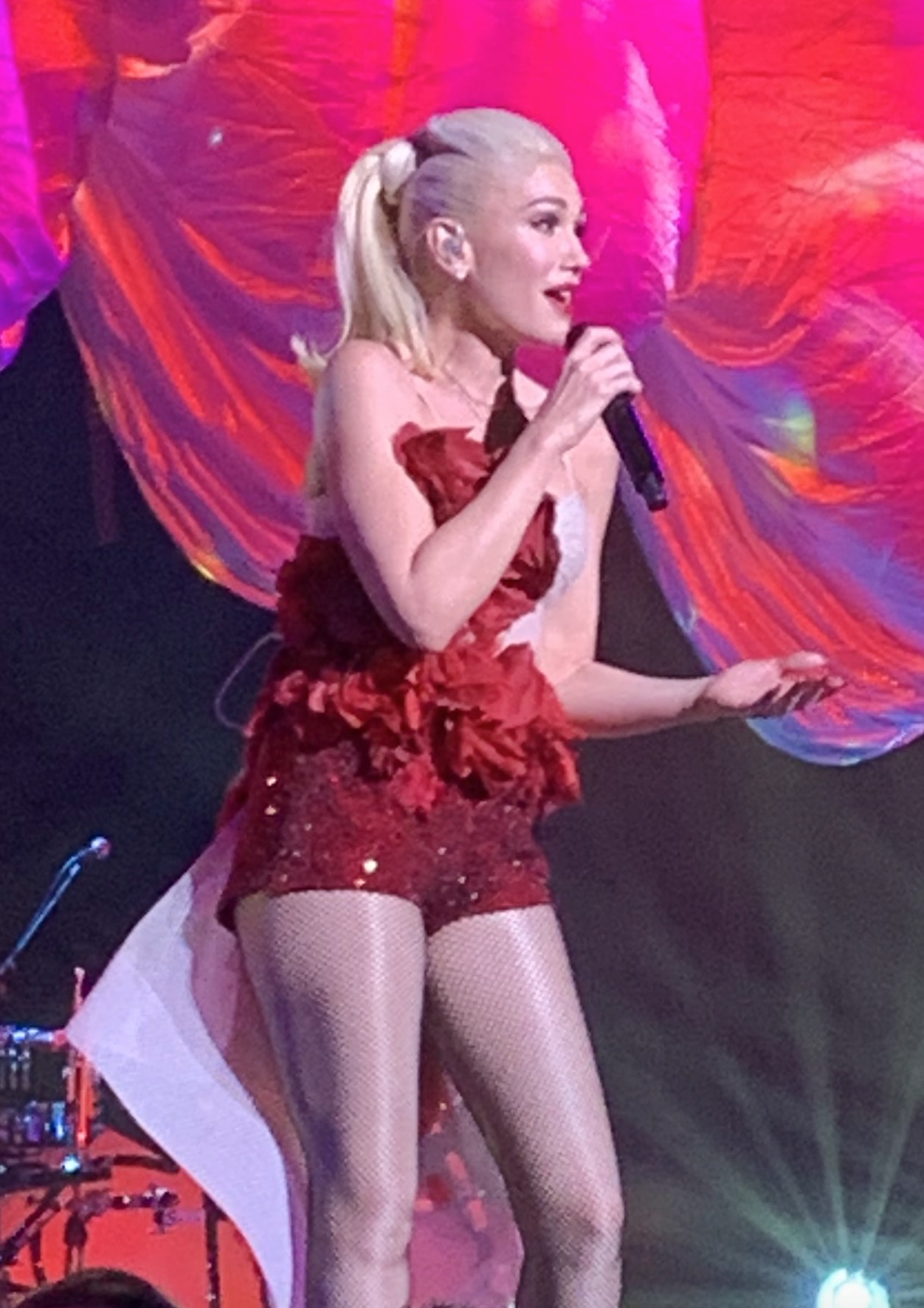
Gwen Stefani scored her first number one on the chart with You Make It Feel Like Christmas in 2017.

Chart history
Reached number one	Artist	Title	Weeks at number one	Ref.
January 2, 2010	Andrea Bocelli	My Christmas	2	
January 16, 2010	Taylor Swift	The Taylor Swift Holiday Collection	1	
October 16, 2010	Celtic Thunder	Celtic Thunder: Christmas	2	
October 30, 2010	Lady Antebellum	A Merry Little Christmas	2	
November 13, 2010	Taylor Swift	The Taylor Swift Holiday Collection	1	
November 20, 2010	Mariah Carey	Merry Christmas II You	1	
November 27, 2010	Susan Boyle	The Gift	8	
October 22, 2011	David Crowder Band	Oh for Joy	2	
November 5, 2011	Chris Tomlin	Glory in the Highest: Christmas Songs of Worship	1	
November 12, 2011	Michael Bublé	Christmas	1	
November 19, 2011	Justin Bieber	Under the Mistletoe	1	
November 26, 2011	Michael Bublé	Christmas	8	
October 13, 2012	Jeremy Camp	Christmas: God with Us	1	
October 20, 2012	Blake Shelton	Cheers, It's Christmas	2	
November 3, 2012	Scotty McCreery	Christmas with Scotty McCreery	1	
November 10, 2012	Lady Antebellum	On This Winter's Night	1	
November 17, 2012	Rod Stewart	Merry Christmas, Baby	6	
December 29, 2012	Michael Bublé	Christmas	2	
October 26, 2013	Various artists	Now Christmas	1	
November 2, 2013	Mary J. Blige	A Mary Christmas	1	
November 9, 2013	Il Volo	Buon Natale: The Christmas Album	1	
November 16, 2013	Kelly Clarkson	Wrapped in Red	1	
November 23, 2013	The Robertsons	Duck the Halls: A Robertson Family Christmas	4	
December 21, 2013	Kelly Clarkson	Wrapped in Red	2	
January 4, 2014	The Robertsons	Duck the Halls: A Robertson Family Christmas	1	
January 11, 2014	Kelly Clarkson	Wrapped in Red	1	
October 25, 2014	Michael W. Smith	Michael W. Smith & Friends: The Spirit of Christmas	1	
November 1, 2014	Idina Menzel	Holiday Wishes	1	
November 8, 2014	Pentatonix	That's Christmas to Me	10	
October 24, 2015	Soundtrack	Tim Burton's The Nightmare Before Christmas: Special Edition	1	
October 31, 2015	MercyMe	MercyMe, It's Christmas!	1	
November 7, 2015	Danny Gokey	Christmas Is Here	1	
November 14, 2015	Chris Tomlin	Adore: Christmas Songs of Worship	1	
November 21, 2015	Pentatonix	That's Christmas to Me	8	
October 22, 2016	Reba McEntire	My Kind of Christmas	1	
October 29, 2016	Celine Dion	These Are Special Times	1	
November 5, 2016	Chris Young	It Must Be Christmas	1	
November 12, 2016	Pentatonix	A Pentatonix Christmas	9	
October 21, 2017	Soundtrack	Tim Burton's The Nightmare Before Christmas	1	
October 28, 2017	Gwen Stefani	You Make It Feel Like Christmas	1	
November 4, 2017	Soundtrack	Tim Burton's The Nightmare Before Christmas	1	
November 11, 2017	Lindsey Stirling	Warmer in the Winter	1	
November 18, 2017	The Piano Guys	Christmas Together	1	
November 25, 2017	Pentatonix	A Pentatonix Christmas	9	
October 20, 2018	Soundtrack	Tim Burton's The Nightmare Before Christmas	1	
October 27, 2018	Eric Clapton	Happy Xmas	1	
November 3, 2018	Lindsey Stirling	Warmer in the Winter	1	
November 10, 2018	John Legend	A Legendary Christmas	1	
November 17, 2018	Pentatonix	Christmas Is Here!	1	
November 24, 2018	Michael Bublé	Christmas	1	
December 1, 2018	Pentatonix	Christmas Is Here!	1	
December 8, 2018	Michael Bublé	Christmas	6	
October 19, 2019	Soundtrack	Tim Burton's The Nightmare Before Christmas	4	
November 16, 2019	Mariah Carey	Merry Christmas	1	
November 23, 2019	Pentatonix	The Best of Pentatonix Christmas	2	
December 7, 2019	Michael Bublé	Christmas	4	

== See also ==
- List of best-selling Christmas albums in the United States
