= PTX Presents: Top Pop, Vol. I =

Studio album by Pentatonix
- Released: April 13, 2018
- Recorded: January–February 2018
- Genre: A cappella; pop; R&B; Latin
- Length: 35:15
- Label: RCA

Pentatonix chronology
PTX, Vol. IV: Classics (2017)	PTX Presents: Top Pop, Vol. I (2018)	Christmas Is Here! (2018)

PTX Presents: Top Pop, Vol. I (alternatively written PTX Presents: Top Pop, Vol. 1) is the sixth studio album by American a cappella group Pentatonix, released on April 13, 2018. It is their first album with bass vocalist Matt Sallee, and without original bass vocalist Avi Kaplan. It is also their first full-length album not to feature any original material.

== Production ==
The album was announced on February 27, 2018, together with a new tour in the following summer. Pentatonix announced the tracklist on April 10.

Three singles from the album were released before the release: "Havana" on February 23, 2018, "New Rules x Are You That Somebody?" on March 9, and "Attention" on March 23. Pentatonix released a performance of a mashup of songs on the album on YouTube on April 19, 2018.

== Reception ==
Professional ratings
Review scores
Source	Rating
AllMusic	3/5 stars

AllMusic gave the album a rating of 3 out of 5, stating "Make no mistake, [Pentatonix] are still proudly the children of Glee, but that's also the ace up their sleeve: they're flashy about their hip attributes, which helps disguise how this album is -- at its core -- music by a very good music theater troupe."

== Track listing ==
No.	Title	Writer(s)	Lead vocals	Length
1.	"Attention" (Charlie Puth cover)	Charlie Puth, Jacob Kasher	Scott Hoying, Mitch Grassi, Kirstin Maldonado	2:51
2.	"Finesse" (Bruno Mars cover)	Bruno Mars, Philip Lawrence, Christopher Brody Brown, James Fauntleroy, Johnathan Yip, Ray Romulus, Jeremy Reeves, Ray McCullough II	Hoying, Grassi	3:11
3.	"New Rules x Are You That Somebody?" (Dua Lipa / Aaliyah medley)	Caroline Ailin, Emily Warren, Ian Kirkpatrick / Static Major, Timbaland	Hoying	2:58
4.	"Havana" (Camila Cabello featuring Young Thug cover)	Camila Cabello, Young Thug, Adam Feeney, Brittany Hazzard, Ali Tamposi, Brian Lee, Andrew Watt, Pharrell Williams, Louis Bell, Kaan Gunesberk	Hoying, Grassi	2:35
5.	"Perfect" (Ed Sheeran cover)	Ed Sheeran, Will Hicks, Benny Blanco	Hoying	4:22
6.	"Stay" (Zedd and Alessia Cara cover)	Linus Wiklund, Sarah Aarons, Anders Frøen, Alessia Caracciolo, Anton Zaslavski, Jonnali Parmenius	Matt Sallee, Hoying, Grassi, Maldonado	3:22
7.	"Feel It Still" (Portugal. The Man cover)	Robert Bateman, Zachary Scott Carothers, Freddie Gorman, John Baldwin Gourley, John Hill, Brian Holland, Eric Andrew Howk, Kyle O'Quin, Jason Wade Sechrist, Asa Taccone	Grassi	3:00
8.	"Despacito x Shape of You" (Luis Fonsi featuring Daddy Yankee / Sheeran medley)	Luis Rodríguez, Erika Ender, Ramón Ayala / Sheeran, Steve Mac, Johnny McDaid, Kandi Burruss, Tameka Cottle, Kevin Briggs	Grassi, Maldonado, Hoying	3:18
9.	"Issues" (Julia Michaels cover)	Julia Michaels, Benjamin Levin, Tor Hermansen, Mikkel Eriksen, Justin Tranter	Maldonado	2:41
10.	"Praying" (Kesha cover)	Kesha Sebert, Andrew Joslyn, Ben Abraham, Ryan Lewis	Hoying, Grassi, Maldonado	3:34
11.	"Sorry Not Sorry" (Demi Lovato cover)	Demi Lovato, Warren "Oak" Felder, Sean Douglas, Trevor Brown, William Zaire Simmons	Hoying, Grassi	3:23
Total length:				35:15

Japanese bonus track
No.	Title	Writer(s)	Lead vocals	Length
12.	"Take On Me" (A-ha cover)	Magne Furuholmen, Morten Harket, Pål Waaktaar	Grassi, Hoying	3:29
Total length:				38:44

== Personnel ==
- Scott Hoying – baritone lead and backing vocals
- Mitch Grassi – tenor lead and backing vocals
- Kirstin Maldonado – alto lead and backing vocals
- Matt Sallee – vocal bass, vocal percussion at the end of "Havana" (beatbass), bass lead and backing vocals
- Kevin Olusola – vocal percussion, backing vocals, vocal flugelhorn at the end of "Havana", cello on "Perfect"

== Charts ==
Chart (2018)	Peak position
Australian Albums (ARIA)	26
Austrian Albums (Ö3 Austria)	8
Belgian Albums (Ultratop Flanders)	28
Belgian Albums (Ultratop Wallonia)	142
Canadian Albums (Billboard)	15
Dutch Albums (Album Top 100)	23
German Albums (Offizielle Top 100)	35
Japanese Albums (Oricon)	34
New Zealand Albums (RMNZ)	30
Polish Albums (ZPAV)	42
Portuguese Albums (AFP)	39
Scottish Albums (OCC)	60
Spanish Albums (PROMUSICAE)	92
Swiss Albums (Schweizer Hitparade)	19
UK Albums (OCC)	76
US Billboard 200	10
