= The Greatest Christmas Hits =

Compilation album by Pentatonix
- Released: October 20, 2023
- Genre: A cappella; Christmas; pop
- Length: 101:00
- Label: RCA

Pentatonix chronology
| Holidays Around the World (2022) | The Greatest Christmas Hits (2023) | Christmas in the City (2025) |

The Greatest Christmas Hits is a Christmas compilation album by American a cappella group Pentatonix. It was released on October 20, 2023.

== Background ==
Pentatonix announced the album on September 2, 2023. It is a two-disc album that features 23 previously released tracks and 8 new ones. The tour for the album, called the Most Wonderful Tour of the Year, began on November 14, 2023, in Palm Springs, California.

On September 25, 2023, the single "Please Santa Please" was released. The album debuted at number 3 on Billboard's Top Holiday Albums chart, dated November 4, 2023.

== Track listing ==
=== Disc 1 ===
Disc 1 track listing
| 1 | "12 Days of Christmas" (solos by Scott Hoying, Mitch Grassi, Kirstin Maldonado, Matt Sallee, and Kevin Olusola) |
| 2 | "God Rest Ye Merry Gentlemen" (solos by Grassi and Maldonado) |
| 3 | "Hark! The Herald Angels Sing" (entirely lead sung by Hoying) |
| 4 | "Hallelujah" (feat. The String Mob) (solos by Hoying, Avi Kaplan, Maldonado, and Grassi) |
| 5 | "That's Christmas to Me" (solos by Hoying, Grassi, and Kaplan) |
| 6 | "Dance of the Sugar Plum Fairy" |
| 7 | "Mary, Did You Know?" (feat. The String Mob) (solos by Hoying, Kaplan, Maldonado, Grassi, and Olusola) |
| 8 | "Little Drummer Boy" (solos by Kaplan, Hoying, Grassi, Maldonado, and Olusola) |
| 9 | "White Winter Hymnal" (Fleet Foxes cover) |
| 10 | "Carol of the Bells" (entirely lead sung by Grassi) |
| 11 | "Deck the Halls" (solos by Grassi, Maldonado, and Hoying) |
| 12 | "O Come, All Ye Faithful" (solos by Hoying, Grassi, and Maldonado) |
| 13 | "Frosty the Snowman" (featuring Alessia Cara; entirely lead sung by Cara) |
| 14 | "Kid on Christmas" (featuring Meghan Trainor; solos by Trainor and Hoying) |
| 15 | "Up on the Housetop" (solos by Hoying, Maldonado, and Grassi) |
| 16 | "Thank You" (entirely lead sung by Hoying) |

=== Disc 2 ===
Disc 2 track listing
| 1 | "Amazing Grace (My Chains Are Gone)" (solos by Sallee, Hoying, Grassi, Maldonado, and Olusola) |
| 2 | "Grown-Up Christmas List" (featuring Kelly Clarkson; entirely lead sung by Clarkson) |
| 3 | "Winter Wonderland / Don't Worry Be Happy" (featuring Tori Kelly; solos by Kelly and Hoying) |
| 4 | "You're a Mean One, Mr. Grinch" (entirely lead sung by Sallee) |
| 5 | "Let It Snow! Let It Snow! Let It Snow!" (entirely lead sung by Hoying) |
| 6 | "How Great Thou Art" (featuring Jennifer Hudson; solos by Hudson and Hoying) |
| 7 | "Joyful, Joyful" (with Jasmine Sullivan; solos by Sullivan, Olusola, Sallee, and Grassi) |
| 8 | "O Holy Night" (2023 version; solos by Hoying, Sallee, Grassi, and Maldonado) |
| 9 | "Christmas (Baby Please Come Home)" (solos by Hoying, Grassi, Sallee, and Maldonado) |
| 10 | "Pure Imagination / Christmas Time Is Here" (solos by Grassi, Maldonado, and Hoying) |
| 11 | "Please Santa Please" (entirely lead sung by Maldonado) |
| 12 | "O Little Town of Bethlehem" (featuring Elvis Presley; solos by Presley, Grassi, and Maldonado) |
| 13 | "Kiss from a Rose" (solos by Grassi, Hoying, Sallee, and Olusola) |
| 14 | "Children, Go Where I Send Thee" |
| 15 | "Little Toy Trains" (entirely lead sung by Grassi) |

== Charts ==
Chart performance for The Greatest Christmas Hits
| Chart (2023–2024) | Peak position |
|---|---|
| Austrian Albums (Ö3 Austria) | 55 |
| Canadian Albums (Billboard) | 11 |
| New Zealand Albums (RMNZ) | 9 |
| Swiss Albums (Schweizer Hitparade) | 86 |
| UK Albums (OCC) | 64 |
| US Billboard 200 | 10 |
| US Top Holiday Albums (Billboard) | 3 |
