= Christmas in the City (Pentatonix album) =

Studio album by Pentatonix
- Released: October 24, 2025
- Genres: Christmas; a cappella
- Length: 46:05
- Label: Republic
- Producers: Pentatonix; Ben Bram; Dave Pierce; Gian Stone; Marcus Lomax; Charles Pignone

Pentatonix chronology
The Greatest Christmas Hits (2023)	Christmas in the City (2025)

Singles from Christmas in the City
- 1. "Bah Humbug" Released: September 24, 2025; 2. "Get Happy / Happy Days Are Here Again" Released: August 6, 2026; 3. "Believe" Released: September 25, 2026

Christmas in the City is a holiday studio album by American a cappella band Pentatonix, released on October 24, 2025. It is their seventh Christmas-themed album and their twelfth studio album overall. The album features collaborations with singers Frank Sinatra and JoJo. The album also marks their first release under their new label, Republic Records.

Christmas in the City debuted at number six on the Billboard Top Holiday Albums chart.

A deluxe edition was released on October 30, 2026.

== Background and development ==
In a press release, Pentatonix described the album's title and concept as inspired by the "magic of Christmastime in New York", with the group aiming for a "whimsical, jazzy, cozy and classy" sonic representation of a spontaneous trip to the snowy city. Christmas in the City is Pentatonix's first album released under their new label, Republic Records.

The concept for Christmas in the City originated when group member Scott Hoying was inspired by a holiday ornament he saw while visiting a festive market in New York City. In an interview with the theatre news website BroadwayWorld, Hoying said that the group wanted to capture and commit to a "big band orchestral sound" that Dean Martin previously made. He also included Bing Crosby and Nat King Cole as inspirations for the album.

Hoying also added that while the album remains "vocal-heavy", it does so "in a Manhattan Transfer way, where there's instruments throughout". He further characterized the project as genre-fluid, stating that it "has no rules", featuring material ranging from songs that "sound like [they're] from a Fosse musical" to "a ton of original music". He further described the album as "fun and bold and theatrical and camp".

iHeart described Christmas in the City as bringing Pentatonix's "signature vocal magic into a wintery New York-inspired holiday soundscape", blending original songs with "jazzy takes on classics" in a "cozy, whimsical, and classily arranged" collection that expands the group's "seasonal legacy".

On August 6, 2026, Pentatonix announced a deluxe edition of Christmas in the City, set for release on October 30, 2026, alongside a new North American leg of the group's Christmas in the City tour. The deluxe edition expands the original 16-track album with 10 new songs, two covers, and seven live recordings. Its announcement included the single "Get Happy / Happy Days Are Here Again", a mashup that group member Kirstin Maldonado said was written as a tribute to "the classic Christmas tunes of Hollywood's Golden Age and the timeless jazz era".

== Composition ==
Christmas in the City is a 16-track album of original songs and holiday classics. The album features their single "Bah Humbug", an original song described as a "witty retelling" of A Christmas Carol by Charles Dickens, specifically revolving around the character Ebenezer Scrooge. The band also featured JoJo with the song "Snowing in Paris" and a posthumous appearance of Frank Sinatra with the song "I've Got My Love to Keep Me Warm".

== Reception ==
Maria Sherman from Associated Press included Christmas in the City as one of the "best new holiday music releases for 2025", noting that the album "celebrates the magic of cosmopolitan life around the holidays" and "showcases the group’s vocal athletics". Writing for the German newspaper Kölner Stadt-Anzeiger, Jan Gebauer described the album as one of the highlights of Christmas albums releases in 2025, noting the group's use of "multi-part arrangements, rhythmic precision, and stylistic diversity". Marc Uytterhaeghe from the Belgian newspaper L'Avenir featured the album in its 2025 holiday music recommendations.

On the other hand, Eric Saeger from the newspaper Hippo gave the album a rating of B−, calling the original tracks "mostly awful" but appreciated the group's covers of traditional carols.

== Track listing ==
Christmas in the City track listing
No.	Title	Writer(s)	Lead vocal(s)	Length
1.	"Snow"	Irving Berlin	Pentatonix	0:21
2.	"Christmas in the City"	Dave Pierce; Scott Hoying	Hoying; Mitch Grassi; Matt Sallee; Kirstin Maldonado	3:20
3.	"Holly Jolly Christmas"	Johnny Marks	Grassi; Hoying; Maldonado; Sallee	2:54
4.	"Santa Be Good to My Baby"	Grassi; S. Hoying; Pierce; Marcus Lomax; Gian Stone	Hoying; Grassi; Maldonado	2:59
5.	"Bah Humbug"	S. Hoying; Pierce; Mark Hoying	Hoying; Sallee; Maldonado; Grassi	3:50
6.	"Snowing in Paris" (featuring JoJo)	M. Hoying; S. Hoying; Pierce	Hoying; JoJo	3:41
7.	"Christmas Movie"	S. Hoying; Lomax; Sallee; Stone; Sean Douglas; Kevin Olusola	Sallee; Grassi; Hoying	3:05
8.	"Caroling, Caroling"	Alfred Burt; Wihla Hutson	Pentatonix	0:35
9.	"The Love Medley"	Alex North; Bert Kaempfert; Bob Crewe; Bob Gaudio; Fabian Andre; Gus Kahn; Hy Zaret; Irving Kahal; Milton Gabler; Nicholas Brodzsky; Sammy Cahn; Sammy Fain; Wilbur Schwandt	Hoying; Maldonado; Sallee	4:40
10.	"Silver Bells"	Jay Livingston; Ray Evans	Hoying; Maldonado; Grassi; Sallee	3:19
11.	"I've Got My Love to Keep Me Warm" (with Frank Sinatra)	Berlin	Sinatra; Maldonado	2:27
12.	"Moody Rudy"	S. Hoying; Maldonado; Marks; Olusola; Sallee; Chuck Berry; Joseph Garland; Marvin Brodie	Hoying	2:42
13.	"Blitzen"	S. Hoying; Pierce	Pentatonix	1:42
14.	"Elf"	S. Hoying; Maldonado; Olusola; Pierce	Hoying; Maldonado	2:52
15.	"Humankind"	S. Hoying; Pierce	Hoying	4:15
16.	"Christmas Classics Medley"	Berlin; Frank Pooler; Hugh Martin; Kim Gannon; Ralph Blane; Richard Carpenter; Walter Kent	Grassi; Hoying; Maldonado	3:22
Total length:				46:05

Christmas in the City (Deluxe) track listing
No.	Title	Writer(s)	Lead vocal(s)	Length
17.	"Man with the Bag" (featuring säje)	Dudley Brooks; Hal Stanley; Irving Taylor	Pentatonix; säje	3:19
18.	"Get Happy / Happy Days are Here Again"	Harold Arlen; Jack Yellen; Milton Ager; Ted Koehler	Grassi; Maldonado	2:15
19.	"Believe"	Alan Silvestri; Glen Ballard	Grassi; Hoying; Maldonado; Sallee	2:50
20.	"Christmas in the City" (live)			3:43
21.	"Silver Bells" (live)			3:18
22.	"Santa Be Good to My Baby" (live)			2:41
23.	"A Holly Jolly Christmas" (live)			2:45
24.	"Blitzen" (live)			1:49
25.	"Bah Humbug" (live)			4:06
26.	"Humankind" (live)			3:38
Total length:				1:16:29

=== Notes ===
- "The Love Medley" is a medley of "Dream a Little Dream of Me", "I'll Never Stop Loving You", "I'll Be Seeing You", "Unchained Melody", "L-O-V-E", and "Can't Take My Eyes Off of You". "The Love Medley" is not contained on any physical release of the album.
- "Moody Rudy" is a mashup of "In the Mood" and "Run Rudolph Run".
- "Christmas Music Medley" is a medley of "Merry Christmas, Darling", "Have Yourself a Merry Little Christmas", "White Christmas", and "Snow".

== Credits and personnel ==
Credits are adapted via Tidal and Apple Music.

=== Musicians ===
Pentatonix

- Scott Hoying – baritone vocals (all tracks), gang vocals (3, 12)
- Mitch Grassi – tenor vocals (all tracks), gang vocals (3, 12)
- Kirstin Maldonado – alto vocals (all tracks), gang vocals (3, 12)
- Matt Sallee – bass vocals (all tracks)
- Kevin Olusola – vocal percussion (tracks 2–7, 10–14), wind sounds (15), baritenor vocals (2, 5, 9, 15–16)

Others

- Doug Tornquist – bass trombone (tracks 2–5, 9–10, 13, 15), tuba (2–5, 9–10, 13, 15)
- Dave Pierce – drums (tracks 2, 5–6, 10, 14), keyboards (2, 5, 10, 14), accordion (6), vibraphone (6)
- Wayne Bergeron – trumpet (tracks 2–6, 9–10, 13, 15)
- Andy Martin – trombone (tracks 2–5, 9–10, 13, 15)
- Ido Meshulam – trombone (tracks 2–5, 9–10, 13, 15)
- Dan Rosenboom – trumpet (tracks 2–5, 9–10, 13, 15)
- Rob Schaer – trumpet (tracks 2–5, 9–10, 13, 15)
- Dan Higgins – woodwinds (tracks 2–5, 9–10, 15), flute (13)
- Chad Smith – woodwinds (tracks 2–5, 9–10, 13, 15)
- Greg Huckins – woodwinds (tracks 2–5, 9–10, 13, 15)
- Sean Franz – woodwinds (tracks 2–5, 9–10, 13, 15)
- Ross Gasworth – cello (tracks 2–3, 5–7, 9, 15)
- Timothy Loo – cello (tracks 2–3, 5–7, 9, 15)
- Marcia Dickstein – harp (tracks 2–3, 5–7, 9, 15)
- Alyssa Park – violin (tracks 2–3, 5–7, 9, 15)
- Jessica Guideri – violin (tracks 2–3, 5–7, 9, 15)
- Marisa Kuney – violin (tracks 2–3, 5–7, 9, 15)
- Mark Robertson – violin (tracks 2–3, 5–7, 9, 15)
- Sara Parkins – violin (tracks 2–3, 5–7, 9, 15)
- Sarah Thornblade – violin (tracks 2–3, 5–7, 9, 15)
- Shalini Vijayan – violin (tracks 2–3, 5–7, 9, 15)
- Ina Veli – violin (tracks 2–3, 5–6, 9, 15)
- Luke Maurer – viola (tracks 2–3, 6–7, 9, 15)
- Meredith Crawford – viola (tracks 2–3, 6–7, 9, 15)
- Stefan Smith – viola (tracks 2–3, 6–7, 9, 15)
- Dylan Hart – horn (tracks 2–3, 5, 9, 13, 15)
- Laura Brenes – horn (tracks 2–3, 5, 9, 13, 15)
- Teag Reeves – horn (tracks 2–3, 5, 9, 13, 15)
- Michael Stever – trumpet (tracks 2–3, 5, 9, 13, 15)
- Miles Foxx Hill – bass (tracks 2, 5–6, 10, 14)
- Miles Black – piano (tracks 2, 5–6, 10, 14)
- Chuck Berghofer – bass (tracks 3–4, 9, 13, 15)
- Peter Erskine – drums (tracks 3–4, 9, 13, 15)
- Tom Rainier – piano (tracks 3–4, 9, 13, 15)
- Marcus Lomax – bass (track 4), piano (4)
- Gian Stone – drums (track 4), piano (7)
- Charlie Tyler – cello (tracks 9, 15)
- Jonah Sirota – viola (tracks 9, 15)
- Ana Landauer – violin (tracks 9, 15)
- Charlie Bishrat – violin (tracks 9, 15)
- Kyle Gilner – violin (tracks 9, 15)
- Tammy Hatwan – violin (tracks 9, 15)
- Harper James – guitar (track 4)
- JoJo – vocals (track 6)
- Sean Douglas – piano (track 7)
- Frank Sinatra – vocals (track 11)

=== Technical ===
- Randy Merrill – mastering (all tracks)
- Adam Greenholtz – mixing (tracks 1–3, 5–6, 8–16), engineering (1–11, 13–16)
- Ed Boyer – mixing (tracks 1–6, 8–10, 12–16)
- Dave Pierce – mixing (tracks 1–3, 5–6, 8–16)
- Rob Kinelsi – mixing (tracks 4, 7)
- Josh Bowman – immersive mixing (tracks 1–3, 5–16)
- Eli Heisler – mixing assistance (tracks 4, 7)
- Sean Phelan – engineering (all tracks)
- Danny Garcia – engineering (tracks 1–3, 5–11, 13–15)
- Adam Michalak – engineering (tracks 2–3, 5, 9, 13, 15)
- Ryan Enockson – engineering (track 2, 5–7, 10, 14)
- Stirling Trig – engineering (track 14), additional engineering (6)
- Gian Stone – engineering (tracks 4, 7)
- Marcus Lomax – engineering (track 4)
- Tyler Graham – additional engineering (tracks 1–10, 13–15)

== Charts ==
Chart performance for Christmas in the City
Chart (2025)	Peak position
US Top Album Sales (Billboard)	28
US Top Holiday Albums (Billboard)	6

== Release history ==
Christmas in the City release history
Region	Date	Format	Label	Ref.
Various	October 24, 2025	CD; LP; digital download; streaming	Republic	
