= The Lucky Ones (Pentatonix album) =

- Official album artwork for the standard version.

Studio album by Pentatonix
- Released: February 12, 2021
- Recorded: 2019–2021
- Studio: Dry Snack Sounds (Los Angeles, California); Scotch Corner Studios (Sherman Oaks, California); The Library (Studio City, California)
- Genre: Pop; a cappella
- Length: 36:13
- Label: RCA
- Producer: Matthew Koma; Dan Book; Jussifer; Johan Carlsson; Ojivolta; Sean Myer; Stuart Crichton; Martin Sjølie; Vaughn Oliver; Ryland Blackinton; NoiseClub

Pentatonix chronology
We Need a Little Christmas (2020)	The Lucky Ones (2021)	Evergreen (2021)

Singles from The Lucky Ones
- 1. "Happy Now" Released: August 14, 2020; 2. "Be My Eyes" Released: October 14, 2020; 3. "Coffee In Bed" Released: February 12, 2021; 4. "A Little Space" Released: August 20, 2021; 5. "Midnight in Tokyo" Released: September 10, 2021

The Lucky Ones ratings
Review scores
Source	Rating
AllMusic	3.5/5 stars

The Lucky Ones is the ninth studio album by American a cappella pop group Pentatonix. It was originally released on February 12, 2021, through RCA Records, and a deluxe version of the album followed on September 10, 2021. It is Pentatonix's second album of original material, after their 2015 self-titled album.

== Background and composition ==
The first single of the album was "Happy Now", which was released on August 14, 2020. On October 14, 2020 the single "Be My Eyes" was released, and the album was announced on the same day for a release date of February 12, 2021. The bulk of the album was composed with and produced by Matthew Koma, best known for his work with Zedd and Carly Rae Jepsen, and his working affiliate Dan Book.

== Track listing ==
The Lucky Ones track listing
No.	Title	Writer(s)	Lead vocals	Length
1.	"Happy Now"	Kirstin Maldonado; Mitch Grassi; Kevin Olusola; Scott Hoying; Matt Sallee; Ross Golan; Johan Carlsson; Jon Bellion; Mark Williams; Raul Cubina; Sean Myer	Hoying, Grassi	3:26
2.	"Love Me When I Don't"	Maldonado; Fransisca Hall; Matthew Koma; Daniel Steven Book	Maldonado, Sallee, Grassi, Hoying	3:20
3.	"Coffee in Bed"	Hoying; Grassi; Koma; Book	Hoying, Grassi	3:15
4.	"Be My Eyes"	Maldonado; Koma; Book	Maldonado	3:25
5.	"A Little Space"	Maldonado; Olusola; Robert Siers Cavallo; Koma; Book	Olusola, Sallee, Hoying	2:54
6.	"Side"	Grassi; Olusola; Sallee; Madison Diaz; Stephen Wrabel; Stuart Crichton	Grassi	3:27
7.	"Bored"	Hoying; Grassi; Olusola; Serj Tankian; Daron Malakian; Koma; Book	Hoying, Grassi	2:47
8.	"Exit Signs"	Maldonado; Sallee; Koma; Book	Maldonado	3:55
9.	"Never Gonna Cry Again"	Grassi; Koma; Book	Grassi	2:57
10.	"It's Different Now"	Maldonado; Koma	Maldonado	3:37
11.	"The Lucky Ones"	Hoying; Lindy Robbins; Martin Sjølie	Hoying, Grassi	3:11
Total length:				36:24

Deluxe edition
No.	Title	Writer(s)	Producer(s)	Length
12.	"Midnight in Tokyo"	Hoying; Justin Tranter; Daniel Keyes; Ryland Blackinton; Vaughn Oliver	Oliver; Blackinton	3:17
13.	"Easy Love"	Hoying; Grassi; Hayley Warner; Rob McCurdy; Chris Petrosino	NoiseClub	3:19
14.	"Anchor"	Grassi; Maureen McDonald; Jesse Shatkin	Shatkin	3:14
15.	"Petals"	Hoying; Grassi; Caroline Polachek; Jussi Karvinen	Jussifer	3:25
16.	"You're Out"	Hoying; Maldonado; Sallee; Karvinen	Jussifer	2:58
17.	"A Little Space" (remix; with Ateez)	Maldonado; Olusola; Cavallo; Koma; Book	Koma; Book	2:54
18.	"Midnight in Tokyo" (remix; featuring Little Glee Monster)	Hoying; Tranter; Keyes; Blackinton; Oliver	Oliver; Blackinton	3:17
Total length:				58:50

== Charts ==
Chart performance for The Lucky Ones
Chart (2021)	Peak position
Swiss Albums (Schweizer Hitparade)	36
US Billboard 200	123
