= Holidays Around the World =

2022 studio album by Pentatonix

Studio album by Pentatonix
- Released: October 28, 2022
- Genres: Christmas; a cappella
- Length: 40:49
- Label: RCA
- Producers: Pentatonix; Ben Bram; Gian Stone; Brandon Paddock; Martin Johnson; Jon Levine; Oussama Rahbani; Toby Gad; Ben Parry

Pentatonix chronology
| Evergreen (2022) | Holidays Around the World (2022) | The Greatest Christmas Hits (2023) |

Professional ratings
Review scores
| Source | Rating |
|---|---|
| AllMusic | 3.5/5 stars |

Holidays Around the World is a holiday studio album by American a cappella band Pentatonix, released on October 28, 2022. It is their sixth Christmas-themed album and their eleventh album overall. This is the second album of the group to receive a Grammy Award nomination for Best Traditional Pop Vocal Album. The album features collaborations with musicians including Meghan Trainor, Lea Salonga, and The King's Singers, among others.

== Track listing ==
Holidays Around the World track listing
| No. | Title | Writer(s) | Lead vocals | Length |
|---|---|---|---|---|
| 1. | "Kid on Christmas" (featuring Meghan Trainor) | Jared Conrad; Kevin Olusola; Matt Sallee; Meghan Trainor; Scott Hoying; Trannie Anderson | Trainor, Hoying | 3:22 |
| 2. | "Jingle Bells" (featuring Lang Lang) | Traditional | Hoying, Mitch Grassi, Sallee, Kirstin Maldonado | 2:46 |
| 3. | "It's the Most Wonderful Time of the Year" | Edward Pola; George Wyle | Sallee | 2:50 |
| 4. | "Love Came on Christmas (Joy to the World x Kumama Papa)" (featuring Grace Lokwa) | Grace Lokwa; Kevin Olusola; Matt Sallee; Scott Hoying | Lokwa, Hoying, Grassi | 4:08 |
| 5. | "Star on Top" | Chris August; Kevin Olusola; Matt Sallee | Sallee, Olusola, Hoying, Maldonado, Grassi | 3:23 |
| 6. | "Prayers for This World" | Diane Warren | Hoying, Grassi, Maldonado, Sallee | 3:42 |
| 7. | "Hark! The Herald Angels Sing" (featuring Hiba Tawaji) | Charles Wesley; Felix Mendelssohn; Ghady Rahbani | Grassi, Tawaji, Maldonado | 3:26 |
| 8. | "Christmas in Our Hearts" (featuring Lea Salonga) | Jose Mari Chan; Rina Cañiza | Hoying, Salonga, Maldonado, Sallee | 3:25 |
| 9. | "Feliz Navidad" (featuring La Santa Cecilia) | José Feliciano | Marisol Hernandez, Maldonado | 2:48 |
| 10. | "Invincible" (featuring Shreya Ghoshal) | Toby Gad; Nisha Arsani; Sid Sriram | Hoying, Grassi, Ghoshal | 3:17 |
| 11. | "Last Christmas" (featuring Hikakin and Seikin) | George Michael | Hoying, Seikin, Hikakin, Grassi | 3:17 |
| 12. | "Silent Night" (featuring The King's Singers) | Traditional | Hoying, The King's Singers, Grassi | 4:25 |
| Total length: | | | | 40:49 |

== Charts ==
Chart performance for Holidays Around the World
| Chart (2022) | Peak position |
|---|---|
| US Billboard 200 | 142 |
| US Top Holiday Albums (Billboard) | 6 |
