= Evergreen (Pentatonix album) =

2021 studio album by Pentatonix

Studio album by Pentatonix
- Released: October 29, 2021
- Genre: Christmas; a cappella
- Length: 39:35
- Label: RCA
- Producer: Ben Bram; Pentatonix

Pentatonix chronology
The Lucky Ones (2021)	Evergreen (2021)	Holidays Around the World (2022)

Professional ratings
Review scores
Source	Rating
AllMusic	3.5/5 stars

Evergreen is a holiday studio album by American a cappella group Pentatonix, released in 2021. It is their fifth Christmas-themed album and their tenth album overall. It received a Grammy Award nomination for Best Traditional Pop Vocal Album.

== Background ==
The album was announced on September 27, 2021, along with the release of the single "It's Been a Long, Long Time". Their renditions of "I Just Called to Say I Love You", "Over the River" (featuring Lindsey Stirling), and "The Prayer" were also singles. The album was released on October 29, 2021, with a tour starting soon after.

== Track listing ==
Evergreen track listing
No.	Title	Writer(s)	Lead vocals	Length
1.	"It's Been a Long, Long Time"	Jule Styne; Sammy Cahn	Scott Hoying, Mitch Grassi, Matt Sallee, Kirstin Maldonado	1:07
2.	"Wonderful Christmastime"	Paul McCartney	Hoying, Grassi, Maldonado, Sallee	2:31
3.	"I Saw Three Ships"	Traditional	Grassi, Hoying, Maldonado, Sallee	3:15
4.	"Home for the Holidays"	Al Stillman; Robert Allen	Hoying, Sallee, Grassi	2:36
5.	"River"	Joni Mitchell	Grassi	2:17
6.	"Over the River" (featuring Lindsey Stirling)	Traditional	Hoying	2:39
7.	"The Prayer"	Carole Bayer Sager; David Foster	Grassi, Hoying, Maldonado	4:21
8.	"Evergreen"	Eric Leva; Jesse "Babyface" Thomas; Kevin Olusola; Kirstin Maldonado; Sam DeRosa; Hoying	Maldonado, Grassi, Hoying, Sallee, Olusola	3:01
9.	"Frosty the Snowman" (featuring Alessia Cara)	Steve Nelson; Walter Rollins	Cara	2:17
10.	"I Just Called to Say I Love You"	Stevie Wonder	Hoying, Maldonado, Grassi	3:26
11.	"Little Saint Nick"	Brian Wilson; Mike Love	Hoying, Sallee	2:02
12.	"It Came Upon the Midnight Clear"	Traditional	Grassi, Maldonado, Hoying, Sallee	3:09
13.	"My Heart with You"	Adrianne Gonzalez; Gabriel Rutman; Kyler Austin England	Pentatonix	4:33
14.	"We Wish You a Merry Christmas"	Traditional	Grassi, Hoying, Maldonado, Sallee	2:16
Total length:				39:35

== Charts ==
Chart performance for Evergreen
Chart (2021)	Peak position
US Billboard 200	72
US Top Holiday Albums (Billboard)	3
