= Christmas in the City =

Christmas in the City may refer to:

- Christmas in the City (Lea Michele album), 2019
- Christmas in the City (Pentatonix album), 2025, or the title track
- "Christmas in the City", a song by Marvin Gaye from the album You're the Man
