= We Need a Little Christmas (Pentatonix album) =

Studio album by Pentatonix
- Released: November 13, 2020
- Genres: Christmas; a cappella
- Length: 38:33
- Label: RCA
- Producers: Ben Bram; Mick Wordley; Pentatonix

Pentatonix chronology
At Home EP (2020)	We Need a Little Christmas (2020)	The Lucky Ones (2021)

Singles from We Need a Little Christmas
- 1. "Amazing Grace (My Chains Are Gone)" Released: November 15, 2020; 2. "Thank You" Released: November 25, 2020; 3. "12 Days of Christmas" Released: November 30, 2020; 4. "My Favorite Things" Released: December 17, 2020

We Need a Little Christmas is the fourth Christmas album, and eighth album overall, by the American a cappella group Pentatonix. It was released on November 13, 2020, by RCA Records.

== Overview ==
We Need a Little Christmas was recorded in each of the group member's houses individually in isolation during the COVID-19 pandemic. It features mostly cover songs, plus the original "Thank You", which was written on group member Scott Hoying's birthday. A music video was released on the group's YouTube channel on November 25, 2020. The first single from the album was "Amazing Grace (My Chains Are Gone)", which was released on November 5, 2020.

== Track listing ==
We Need a Little Christmas track listing
No.	Title	Writer(s)	Lead vocals	Length
1.	"12 Days of Christmas"	Traditional	Scott Hoying, Mitch Grassi, Kirstin Maldonado, Matt Sallee, Kevin Olusola	3:04
2.	"Rudolph the Red-Nosed Reindeer"	Johnny Marks	Grassi, Hoying, Maldonado, Sallee	2:42
3.	"My Favorite Things" (from The Sound of Music)	Richard Rodgers, Oscar Hammerstein II	Maldonado, Sallee, Grassi, Hoying	2:52
4.	"Amazing Grace (My Chains Are Gone)"	John Newton, Chris Tomlin	Sallee, Hoying, Grassi, Maldonado, Olusola	4:25
5.	"Thank You"	Hoying, Mark Manio	Hoying	3:54
6.	"Santa Tell Me" (Ariana Grande cover)	Ariana Grande, Savan Kotecha, ILYA	Hoying, Grassi, Maldonado	3:04
7.	"Jingle Bell Rock"	Jim Boothe, Joe Beal	Hoying, Maldonado, Sallee	1:47
8.	"When You Wish Upon a Star" (from Pinocchio)	Leigh Harline, Ned Washington	Grassi, Hoying, Maldonado, Sallee	3:06
9.	"Once Upon a December" (from Anastasia and featuring an uncredited Voctave)	Stephen Flaherty, Lynn Ahrens	Maldonado	2:40
10.	"Happy Holiday / The Holiday Season"	Irving Berlin, Kay Thompson	Hoying	2:34
11.	"White Christmas" (featuring Bing Crosby and the London Symphony Orchestra)	Irving Berlin	Crosby	3:03
12.	"We Need a Little Christmas"	Jerry Herman	Maldonado, Hoying, Sallee, Grassi	2:26
13.	"Seasons of Love" (from Rent)	Jonathan Larson	Maldonado, Hoying	2:51
Total length:				38:33

== Personnel ==
Pentatonix

- Scott Hoying – baritone lead and backing vocals, piano on "Thank You"
- Mitch Grassi – tenor lead and backing vocals
- Kirstin Maldonado – alto lead and backing vocals
- Matt Sallee – vocal bass, bass lead and backing vocals
- Kevin Olusola – vocal percussion, tenor backing vocals, lead vocals on “12 Days of Christmas” and “Amazing Grace”, cello on "Thank You", vocal flugelhorn on "Rudolph The Red-Nosed Reindeer"

Others

- Ben Bram – producer, recording engineer
- Mick Wordley – producer
- Voctave – choir on "Once Upon a December"
- Bing Crosby – guest lead vocals on "White Christmas"
- London Symphony Orchestra – various instruments on "White Christmas"

== Charts ==
Chart performance for We Need a Little Christmas
Chart (2020)	Peak position
Australian Albums (ARIA)	64
Austrian Albums (Ö3 Austria)	29
Canadian Albums (Billboard)	46
Swedish Albums (Sverigetopplistan)	51
US Billboard 200	23
US Top Holiday Albums (Billboard)	4
