= Can't Sleep Love =

Single by Pentatonix

from the album Pentatonix
- Released: September 4, 2015
- Recorded: 2015
- Genre: A cappella
- Length: 2:53
- Label: RCA
- Songwriter(s): Pentatonix; Elof Loelv; Kevin Figueiredo; Teddy Peña; William Wells
- Producer(s): Pentatonix

Pentatonix singles chronology
"Cheerleader" (2015)	"Can't Sleep Love" (2015)	"Where Are Ü Now" (2015)

Music video
- "Can’t Sleep Love – Pentatonix" on YouTube; "Can’t Sleep Love – Pentatonix ft Tink" on YouTube

"Can't Sleep Love" is a song recorded by American a cappella group Pentatonix from their eponymous fourth studio album, Pentatonix (2015). It was released as the lead single from the album via RCA Records on September 4, 2015, and is Pentatonix's first original track released as a single. It was written by all members of Pentatonix with Elof Loelv, Kevin Figueiredo, Teddy Peña and William Wells, and was produced by the band. A second version of the song, featuring American musician Tink, was released on September 18, 2015.

== Chart performance ==
"Can't Sleep Love" first entered the US Billboard Hot 100 at number 99 on the week ending November 7, 2015.

== Music video ==
The music video for "Can't Sleep Love" was released at September 4, 2015. The version featuring Tink was released at September 18, 2015. The video shows the Members of Pentatonix in various rooms with elaborate wallpaper designs and models with their bodies painted to match the rooms.

== Live performances ==
Pentatonix performed "Can't Sleep Love" on The Tonight Show Starring Jimmy Fallon on October 16, 2015.

== Track listings ==
Digital download

1. "Can't Sleep Love" – 2:53

Digital download (featuring Tink)

1. "Can't Sleep Love" (featuring Tink) – 3:33

== Charts and certifications ==
=== Weekly charts ===
Chart (2015)	Peak position
Belgium (Ultratip Bubbling Under Flanders)	35
Japan (Japan Hot 100)	18
US Billboard Hot 100	99
US Adult Contemporary (Billboard)	19
US Adult Pop Airplay (Billboard)	24
US Pop Airplay (Billboard)	36

=== Certifications ===
Region	Certification	Certified units/sales
United States (RIAA)	Gold	500,000^{‡}
^{‡} Sales+streaming figures based on certification alone.
