= A Pentatonix Christmas =

Studio album by Pentatonix
- Released: October 21, 2016
- Recorded: 2016
- Genres: A cappella; Christmas
- Length: 34:22
- Label: RCA
- Producers: Alex Green; Andrew Kesler; Ben Bram; PTX

Pentatonix chronology
Pentatonix (2015)	A Pentatonix Christmas (2016)	PTX, Vol. IV: Classics (2017)

A Pentatonix Christmas is the fifth studio album by American a cappella group Pentatonix. It is also their second full-length holiday album following That's Christmas to Me in 2014. Featuring two new original songs, "Good to Be Bad" and "The Christmas Sing-Along", A Pentatonix Christmas debuted on the Billboard 200 at number three with 52,000 albums sold in its first week, and later peaked at number one, selling 206,000 units in its best week. A Pentatonix Christmas marks as their second number one album on the Billboard 200 after Pentatonix. The album also debuted atop the Billboard Holiday Albums chart, their second number one on that chart after That's Christmas to Me. The deluxe edition of the album fell from number 6 to 200 on the Billboard 200 in 2018, the greatest drop for an album within the chart in Billboard history. The album also, with a guest appearance by The Manhattan Transfer, marked the first recording by the fourth iteration of the group, as this was Trist Curless' first participation with the group in a recording since the death of Tim Hauser, whom Curless officially replaced in 2014.

As of November 2017, 938,000 units of A Pentatonix Christmas have been sold in the US and 1,400,000 units worldwide. A deluxe edition was released on October 20, 2017, almost a year after the original's release. The deluxe edition additionally marks the first appearance of replacement bass Matt Sallee and the second to last appearance of Avi Kaplan.

== Track listing ==
A Pentatonix Christmas – Standard edition
No.	Title	Writer(s)	Lead vocals	Length
1.	"O Come, All Ye Faithful"	Traditional	Scott Hoying, Mitch Grassi, Kirstin Maldonado	3:35
2.	"God Rest Ye Merry Gentlemen"	Traditional	Grassi, Maldonado	2:29
3.	"White Christmas" (featuring The Manhattan Transfer)	Irving Berlin, arr. by Jacob Collier	Avi Kaplan, Hoying, The Manhattan Transfer	3:19
4.	"I'll Be Home for Christmas"	Kim Gannon; Buck Ram; Walter Kent	Hoying, Grassi, Maldonado, Kaplan	3:27
5.	"Up on the Housetop"	Benjamin Hanby	Hoying, Maldonado, Grassi	2:15
6.	"The Christmas Sing-Along"	Kevin "K.O." Olusola; Hoying	Hoying	3:16
7.	"Coventry Carol"	Traditional	Avi Kaplan	3:02
8.	"Hallelujah"	Leonard Cohen	Hoying, Kaplan, Maldonado, Grassi	4:29
9.	"Coldest Winter"	Roland Orzabal; Kanye West; Ernest Wilson	Maldonado, Grassi	2:28
10.	"Good to Be Bad"	Hoying; Kirstin Maldonado	Maldonado	2:07
11.	"Merry Christmas, Happy Holidays"	JC Chasez; Vincent DeGiorgio; Justin Timberlake	Hoying	3:57
Total length:				34:26

A Pentatonix Christmas – Deluxe edition (bonus tracks)
No.	Title	Writer(s)	Length
12.	"Deck the Halls" (This arrangement contains elements of Angels We Have Heard on High)	Traditional	2:46
13.	"How Great Thou Art" (featuring Jennifer Hudson)	Traditional	4:08
14.	"Away in a Manger"	Traditional	3:04
15.	"Let It Snow! Let It Snow! Let It Snow!"	Sammy Cahn; Jule Styne	2:00
16.	"Hallelujah" (featuring The String Mob)	Leonard Cohen	4:31
Total length:			51:00

== Personnel ==
Credits adapted from AllMusic.

=== Pentatonix ===
- Scott Hoying – baritone lead, backing vocals, co-vocal bass on "Hallelujah”
- Mitch Grassi – tenor lead and backing vocals
- Kirstin Maldonado – alto lead and backing vocals
- Avi Kaplan – vocal bass, bass lead and backing vocals
- Kevin "K.O." Olusola – vocal percussion, beatboxing, tenor backing vocals, vocal flugelhorn on "Good To Be Bad", lead vocals on "Away in a Manger"

=== Additional personnel ===
- The Manhattan Transfer – featured artist
- Kala Batch – choir/chorus
- Ed Boyer – mixing
- Ben Bram – arranger, engineer, production
- Jacob Collier – contractor, arranger
- Jessi Collins – choir/chorus
- Tim Davis – contractor, engineer
- Luke Edgemon – choir/chorus
- Anthony Evans – choir/chorus
- Alex Green – production
- Missi Hale – choir/chorus
- Bill Hare – mastering
- Andrew Kesler – production
- Keri Larson – choir/chorus
- David Laucks – choir/chorus
- Shang-Po Lin – engineering
- Toby Lin – engineering assistance
- Keith Noftary – A&R
- Tiffany Palmer – choir/chorus
- Brandon Winbush – choir/chorus
- Mick Wordley – engineering

=== Deluxe edition ===
- Matt Sallee - vocal bass, bass backing vocals
- Reno Selmser - vocal bass, bass backing vocals (on "Let It Snow")

== Charts ==
=== Weekly charts ===
Chart (2016–2017)	Peak position
Australian Albums (ARIA)	16
Austrian Albums (Ö3 Austria)	4
Belgian Albums (Ultratop Flanders)	18
Belgian Albums (Ultratop Wallonia)	40
Canadian Albums (Billboard)	1
Czech Albums (ČNS IFPI)	77
Danish Albums (Hitlisten)	26
Dutch Albums (Album Top 100)	13
French Albums (SNEP)	147
German Albums (Offizielle Top 100)	13
Hungarian Albums (MAHASZ)	32
Italian Albums (FIMI)	29
Japanese Albums (Oricon)	47
Latvian Albums (LaIPA)	45
New Zealand Albums (RMNZ)	18
Norwegian Albums (VG-lista)	14
Polish Albums (ZPAV)	22
Scottish Albums (Official Charts)	57
Slovak Albums (ČNS IFPI)	58
Spanish Albums (PROMUSICAE)	100
Swedish Albums (Sverigetopplistan)	47
Swiss Albums (Schweizer Hitparade)	15
UK Albums (Official Charts)	73
UK Album Downloads (Official Charts)	36
US Billboard 200	1
US Top Holiday Albums (Billboard)	1
US Indie Store Album Sales (Billboard)	6

Chart (2024)	Peak position
German Pop Albums (Offizielle Top 100)	9

=== Year-end charts ===
Chart (2016)	Position
Australian Albums (ARIA)	99
Austrian Albums (Ö3 Austria)	32
Belgian Albums (Ultratop Flanders)	122
US Billboard 200	189
Chart (2017)	Position
Canadian Albums (Billboard)	23
US Billboard 200	16
Chart (2018)	Position
US Billboard 200	79

=== Decade-end charts ===
Chart (2010–2019)	Position
US Billboard 200	87

== Certifications ==
Region	Certification	Certified units/sales
Austria (IFPI Austria)	Gold	7,500^{*}
Canada (Music Canada)	2× Platinum	160,000^{‡}
Denmark (IFPI Danmark)	Gold	10,000^{‡}
Germany (BVMI)	Gold	100,000^{‡}
Poland (ZPAV)	Platinum	20,000^{‡}
United States (RIAA)	Platinum	938,000
Summaries
Worldwide	—	1,400,000
^{*} Sales figures based on certification alone.^{‡} Sales+streaming figures based on certification alone.

== See also ==
- List of Billboard Top Holiday Albums number ones of the 2010s
