= Pentatonix (album) =

Studio album by Pentatonix
- Released: October 16, 2015
- Recorded: 2015
- Genre: A cappella; pop; R&B
- Length: 41:55
- Label: RCA
- Producer: Pentatonix; Thaddius Kuk Harrell; Martin Johnson; Ed Boyer; Drew Pearson; Ben Bram

Pentatonix chronology
That's Christmas to Me (2014)	Pentatonix (2015)	A Pentatonix Christmas (2016)

Singles from Pentatonix
- 1. "Cheerleader" Released: August 21, 2015; 2. "Can't Sleep Love" Released: September 4, 2015; 3. "Where Are Ü Now" Released: September 25, 2015; 4. "Sing" Released: October 16, 2015; 5. "If I Ever Fall in Love" Released: February 15, 2016

Pentatonix is the fourth studio album by American a cappella group Pentatonix, which was released on October 16, 2015.

The release date was announced on Twitter by a series of pictures featuring the five band members released over a five-day-span, with one band member added to the picture each day, culminating in the date being revealed on August 28. It is the group's seventh release overall in their discography.

This is the first release of the band to feature predominantly original material (the only covers being the cover of Shai's "If I Ever Fall in Love" and the bonus tracks on the deluxe version of the album). Pentatonix also marks the first time band members receive individual songwriting credits for the majority of the tracks.

Pentatonix debuted atop the US Billboard 200 chart with 98,000 album-equivalent units, with the album being their first No. 1 album on the chart.

== Critical reception ==
The album received mostly positive reviews from critics. Matt Collar of AllMusic wrote, "Ultimately, by moving away from cover tunes, Pentatonix have helped push the a cappella style even further into the pop spotlight. That the only instruments they've used to do it are their voices makes their achievement all the more impressive."

In an online review, Brittany Spanos of Rolling Stone gave the album a 2.5 out of 5 star review, criticizing the lyrics and saying that the album "lacks any oomph to go with their well-honed chops."

== Commercial performance ==
The album debuted at number 8 in New Zealand and number 1 on the US Billboard 200. In the US, the album started with 98,000 album-equivalent units (88,000 in pure album sales).

== Track listing ==
Pentatonix — Standard edition
No.	Title	Writer(s)	Lead vocals	Length
1.	"Na Na Na"	Avi Kaplan; Kevin Olusola; Taylor Parks	Mitch Grassi	2:35
2.	"Can't Sleep Love"	Pentatonix; Elof Loelv; Kevin Figueiredo; Teddy Peña; William Wells	Scott Hoying; Grassi	2:53
3.	"Sing"	Hoying; Grassi; Olusola; Martin Johnson; Sam Hollander	Hoying; Kaplan; Grassi; Olusola	2:57
4.	"Misbehavin'"	Hoying; Grassi; Matt Rad; Ruth-Anne Cunningham	Hoying; Grassi	3:42
5.	"Ref"	Hoying; Olusola; Parks	Hoying; Kirstin Maldonado	3:14
6.	"First Things First"	Hoying; Olusola; Kevin Fisher	Hoying	2:41
7.	"Rose Gold"	Hoying; Kaplan; Drew Pearson; Stephen Wrabel	Hoying	3:43
8.	"If I Ever Fall in Love" (Shai cover featuring Jason Derulo)	Carl Martin	Derulo; Hoying	3:14
9.	"Cracked"	Hoying; Kaplan; CJ Baran; Talay Riley	Hoying	2:54
10.	"Water"	Olusola; Maldonado; Audra Mae	Maldonado	3:11
11.	"Take Me Home"	Olusola; Maldonado; Mae	Hoying; Grassi	2:56
12.	"New Year's Day"	Hoying; Grassi; Olusola; Johnson; Hollander	Hoying; Grassi	3:37
13.	"Light in the Hallway"	Hoying; Grassi; Mae	Kaplan	4:14
Total length:				41:55

Pentatonix — Deluxe edition
No.	Title	Writer(s)	Lead vocals	Length
14.	"Where Are Ü Now"	Jason "Poo Bear" Boyd; Sonny Moore; Thomas Wesley Pentz; Karl Rubin Brutus Jordan Ware	Grassi; Hoying	2:51
15.	"Cheerleader"	Omar Samuel Pasley; Clifton Dillon; Mark Bradford; Ryan Dillon	Grassi; Hoying; Maldonado	3:03
16.	"Lean On"	Karen Ørsted; Pentz; William Griachine; Philip Meckseper; Martin Bresso	Grassi	2:40
17.	"Can't Sleep Love" (featuring Tink)	Pentatonix; Loelv; Figueiredo; Peña; Wells; Trinity Home	Hoying; Grassi; Tink	3:33
Total length:				54:30

Pentatonix — Deluxe Target exclusive version
No.	Title	Writer(s)	Lead vocals	Length
18.	"To the River"	Olusola; Hoying; Fisher	Grassi; Kaplan; Hoying	3:42
19.	"Problem" (live)	Max Martin; Savan Kotecha; Ilya Salmanzadeh; Amethyst Kelly; Ariana Grande	Hoying; Olusola; Grassi; Kaplan	2:24
20.	"Aha!" (live)	Imogen Jennifer Jane Heap	Grassi	3:11
Total length:				1:03:21

== Personnel ==
Pentatonix

- Scott Hoying – baritone lead and backing vocals
- Mitch Grassi – tenor lead and backing vocals
- Kirstin Maldonado – alto lead and backing vocals
- Avi Kaplan – vocal bass, bass lead and backing vocals
- Kevin Olusola – vocal percussion, beatboxing, backing vocals, rapping

Additional personnel

- Pentatonix, Thaddus "Kuk" Harrell, Martin Johnson, Ed Boyer, Drew Pearson, Ben Bram – production
- Jason Derulo – vocals on "If I Ever Fall in Love"
- Tink – vocals on "Can't Sleep Love" (deluxe version only)
- Members of A Cappella Academy Retreat as background vocals on "Misbehavin'", "New Year's Day", and "To the River"
- Members of recording studio as background vocals on "Lean On"

== Charts ==
=== Weekly charts ===
Chart (2015)	Peak position
Australian Albums (ARIA)	5
Austrian Albums (Ö3 Austria)	14
Belgian Albums (Ultratop Flanders)	26
Belgian Albums (Ultratop Wallonia)	77
Canadian Albums (Billboard)	7
Dutch Albums (Album Top 100)	14
French Albums (SNEP)	83
German Albums (Offizielle Top 100)	38
Irish Albums (IRMA)	21
Italian Albums (FIMI)	33
Japanese Albums (Oricon)	13
New Zealand Albums (RMNZ)	8
Norwegian Albums (VG-lista)	21
Portuguese Albums (AFP)	20
Scottish Albums (OCC)	14
Spanish Albums (PROMUSICAE)	57
Swiss Albums (Schweizer Hitparade)	24
Taiwanese Albums (Five Music)	4
UK Albums (OCC)	18
US Billboard 200	1
US Digital Albums (Billboard)	1

=== Year-end charts ===
Chart (2015)	Position
US Billboard 200	190
Chart (2016)	Position
US Billboard 200	103

== Certifications ==
Region	Certification	Certified units/sales
Canada (Music Canada)	Gold	40,000^{‡}
United States (RIAA)	Gold	500,000^{‡}
^{‡} Sales+streaming figures based on certification alone.
