= That's Christmas to Me =

Studio album by Pentatonix
- Released: October 21, 2014
- Recorded: 2012, 2014
- Genre: A cappella; Christmas
- Length: 32:39
- Label: RCA
- Producer: Pentatonix; Ben Bram; Bill Hare

Pentatonix chronology
PTX, Vol. III (2014)	That's Christmas to Me (2014)	Pentatonix (2015)

Singles from That's Christmas to Me
- 1. "Mary, Did You Know" Released: October 17, 2014; 2. "Silent Night" Released: November 25, 2014

That's Christmas to Me is the third studio album by a cappella group Pentatonix. It is their sixth release overall and their second holiday release following their 2012 EP PTXmas. It only features previously unreleased material (except "Let It Go", a bonus track of the Japanese Edition of Vols. 1 & 2). It was released on October 21, 2014 through RCA Records, peaked at number 2 on the Billboard 200, and has been certified double platinum by the Recording Industry Association of America.

The album is named after the eponymous song by Pentatonix, the only original song featured on the album. By year's end, December 31, 2014, according to Billboard, it reached a final 2014 total of 1.14 million copies sold, becoming the 4th best selling album of 2014 by any artist of any genre. The album is also the highest charting holiday album by a group since 1962. The album has sold 2,200,000 copies in the United States as of December 2016.

== Commercial performance ==
That's Christmas to Me peaked at number two on the Billboard 200 in the United States. and at number 4 on the Billboard Canadian Albums Chart. The album also charted moderately in other countries including Australia, New Zealand and Norway. On December 1, 2014, That's Christmas to Me was certified gold by the Recording Industry Association of America and became the group's first accredited release in the US. By year's end (December 31, 2014), Billboard reported that the album had sold a total of 1.14 million copies, becoming only the 4th album to sell a million copies in 2014 in any genre (being surpassed only by Taylor Swift's 1989, the Frozen soundtrack, and Sam Smith's In the Lonely Hour) and was the Top Selling Holiday Album for 2014. Pentatonix became the first act to top both the Holiday Albums and Holiday Songs charts simultaneously since the Holiday 100 launched as a multi-metric tabulation in December 2011. The album is also the highest charting holiday album by a group since 1962. The album has sold 1,900,000 copies in the US as of December 2016. It is the only Christmas album to appear on the 2010s decade-end chart for the Billboard 200, charted at 75.

A single from the album, the group's cover of "Mary, Did You Know?", both debuted and peaked on the Billboard Hot 100 at number 26, number 7 on the Adult Contemporary chart, and at number 44 on the Canadian Hot 100. The album's title track, "That's Christmas to Me", also peaked at number 8 on the Adult Contemporary chart. During the holiday season, seven songs from That's Christmas to Me charted on the Billboard Holiday Digital Songs chart: "Mary, Did You Know?" at number 1, "White Winter Hymnal" at number 2, "Silent Night" at number 5, "Dance of the Sugar Plum Fairy" at number 8, "Sleigh Ride" at number 12, "That's Christmas to Me" at number 16 and "Hark! The Herald Angels Sing" at number 17.

== Critical reception ==
The album received generally favorable reviews by critics. Popdust complimented its "blistery bold arrangements," and the group's "truly remarkable, pinpoint precision." Markos Papadatos from Digital Journal described it as "pure joy and one of the best projects I've heard this year." FDRMX gave it 4.5 out of 5 stars, claiming the album has "a good mix of traditional holiday songs, religious ballads and originals thrown in." The Milwaukee Journal Sentinel dubbed it a "Christmas miracle," citing a "streak of beautifully sung, creative arrangements."

== Promotion ==
In November 2014, Pentatonix were invited by Australian film director, producer and screenwriter Baz Luhrmann to be involved with the Holiday Window display at Barneys in New York City. Pentatonix performed at the opening night with a medley of songs from That's Christmas to Me.

On November 27, 2014, Pentatonix participated in the annual Macy's Thanksgiving Day Parade in New York City, performing "Santa Claus Is Coming to Town" on the Homewood Suites float. Pentatonix also performed during NBC's annual Christmas in Rockefeller Center special on December 3, 2014, performing "Sleigh Ride" and "Santa Claus Is Coming to Town".

Pentatonix returned to The Sing-Off, performing a medley of songs from That's Christmas to Me during the Season 5 holiday special, which aired on December 17, 2014.

== Track listing ==
All songs arranged by Pentatonix and Ben Bram.

That's Christmas to Me — Standard edition
No.	Title	Lyrics	Music	Lead vocals	Length
1.	"Hark! The Herald Angels Sing"	Charles Wesley	Felix Mendelssohn	Scott Hoying	3:12
2.	"White Winter Hymnal"	Robin Pecknold	Pecknold	Pentatonix	2:47
3.	"Sleigh Ride"	Mitchell Parish	Leroy Anderson	Kirstin Maldonado, Hoying	2:16
4.	"Winter Wonderland" / "Don't Worry Be Happy" (featuring Tori Kelly)	Richard B. Smith / Bobby McFerrin	Felix Bernard / McFerrin	Hoying, Kelly	3:27
5.	"That's Christmas to Me"	Hoying, Kevin Olusola	Hoying, Olusola	Hoying, Mitch Grassi, Avi Kaplan	3:02
6.	"Mary, Did You Know?"	Mark Lowry	Buddy Greene	Hoying, Kaplan, Maldonado, Grassi, Olusola	3:23
7.	"Dance of the Sugar Plum Fairy"	-	Pyotr Ilyich Tchaikovsky	Pentatonix	2:06
8.	"It's the Most Wonderful Time of the Year"	Edward Pola, George Wyle	Pola, Wyle	Kaplan	3:05
9.	"Santa Claus Is Coming to Town"	John Frederick Coots, Haven Gillespie	Coots, Gillespie	Hoying, Grassi, Maldonado	2:42
10.	"Silent Night"	Joseph Mohr	Franz Xaver Gruber	Grassi, Kaplan	3:13
11.	"Let It Go" (from Frozen)	Kristen Anderson-Lopez, Robert Lopez	Anderson-Lopez, Lopez	Grassi, Maldonado	3:26
Total length:					32:54

That's Christmas to Me — Deluxe edition
No.	Title	Length
12.	"Joy to the World"	2:19
13.	"Just for Now"	3:19
14.	"The First Noel"	3:39
15.	"Have Yourself a Merry Little Christmas"	3:22
16.	"Mary, Did You Know" (featuring The String Mob)	3:22
Total length:		48:48

That's Christmas to Me — Japanese edition (bonus tracks)
No.	Title	Length
12.	"Angels We Have Heard on High"	3:41
13.	"O Come, O Come Emmanuel"	3:35
14.	"Carol of the Bells"	3:13
15.	"The Christmas Song (Chestnuts Roasting on an Open Fire)"	3:43
16.	"O Holy Night"	2:25
17.	"This Christmas"	4:23
18.	"Little Drummer Boy"	4:15
19.	"Go Tell It on the Mountain"	3:04
20.	"Christmas Eve"	2:39
Total length:		63:37

That's Christmas to Me — QVC exclusive CD
No.	Title	Length
1.	"Angels We Have Heard on High"	3:41
2.	"Carol of the Bells"	3:13
3.	"Little Drummer Boy"	4:15
4.	"O Holy Night"	2:25
Total length:		13:34

== Personnel ==
- Scott Hoying – producer, baritone lead and backing vocals, co- vocal bass, and bass backing vocals on "It's The Most Wonderful Time Of The Year"
- Mitch Grassi – producer, tenor lead and backing vocals
- Kirstin Maldonado – producer, alto lead and backing vocals
- Avi Kaplan – producer, vocal bass, bass lead and backing vocals
- Kevin Olusola – producer, vocal percussion and backing vocals, lead vocals on "Mary Did You Know?" and "The First Noel"

Additional personnel

- Ben Bram – producer
- Tori Kelly – lead vocals in "Winter Wonderland" / "Don't Worry Be Happy"
- Andrew Kesler – string producer on "Mary, Did You Know" (featuring The String Mob)
- Ed Boyer – mixing
- Bill Hare – mastering

== Charts ==
=== Weekly charts ===
Chart (2014–2025)	Peak position
Australian Albums (ARIA)	21
Austrian Albums (Ö3 Austria)	11
Belgian Albums (Ultratop Flanders)	192
Canadian Albums (Billboard)	4
Dutch Albums (Album Top 100)	52
German Albums (Offizielle Top 100)	53
Japanese Albums (Oricon)	18
Latvian Albums (LaIPA)	41
New Zealand Albums (RMNZ)	23
Norwegian Albums (VG-lista)	11
Scottish Albums (OCC)	80
Swedish Albums (Sverigetopplistan)	23
Swiss Albums (Schweizer Hitparade)	63
UK Albums (OCC)	79
UK Album Downloads (OCC)	34
US Billboard 200	2
US Top Holiday Albums (Billboard)	1
US Indie Store Album Sales (Billboard)	16

=== Year-end charts ===
Chart (2015)	Position
Canadian Albums (Billboard)	20
US Billboard 200	14
US Digital Albums (Billboard)	12
Chart (2016)	Position
Canadian Albums (Billboard)	49
US Billboard 200	31
US Catalog Albums (Billboard)	2
US Digital Albums (Billboard)	21
Chart (2017)	Position
US Billboard 200	98
US Catalog Albums (Billboard)	23
Chart (2018)	Position
US Billboard 200	197
US Catalog Albums (Billboard)	39

=== Decade-end charts ===
Chart (2010–2019)	Position
US Billboard 200	75

== Certifications ==
Region	Certification	Certified units/sales
Australia (ARIA)	Gold	35,000^{‡}
Austria (IFPI Austria)	Gold	7,500^{*}
Canada (Music Canada)	2× Platinum	160,000^{‡}
Denmark (IFPI Danmark)	Gold	10,000^{‡}
United Kingdom (BPI)	Silver	60,000^{‡}
United States (RIAA)	2× Platinum	2,200,000
^{*} Sales figures based on certification alone.^{‡} Sales+streaming figures based on certification alone.

== See also ==
- List of Billboard Top Holiday Albums number ones of the 2010s
