= Pentatonix =

American a cappella group

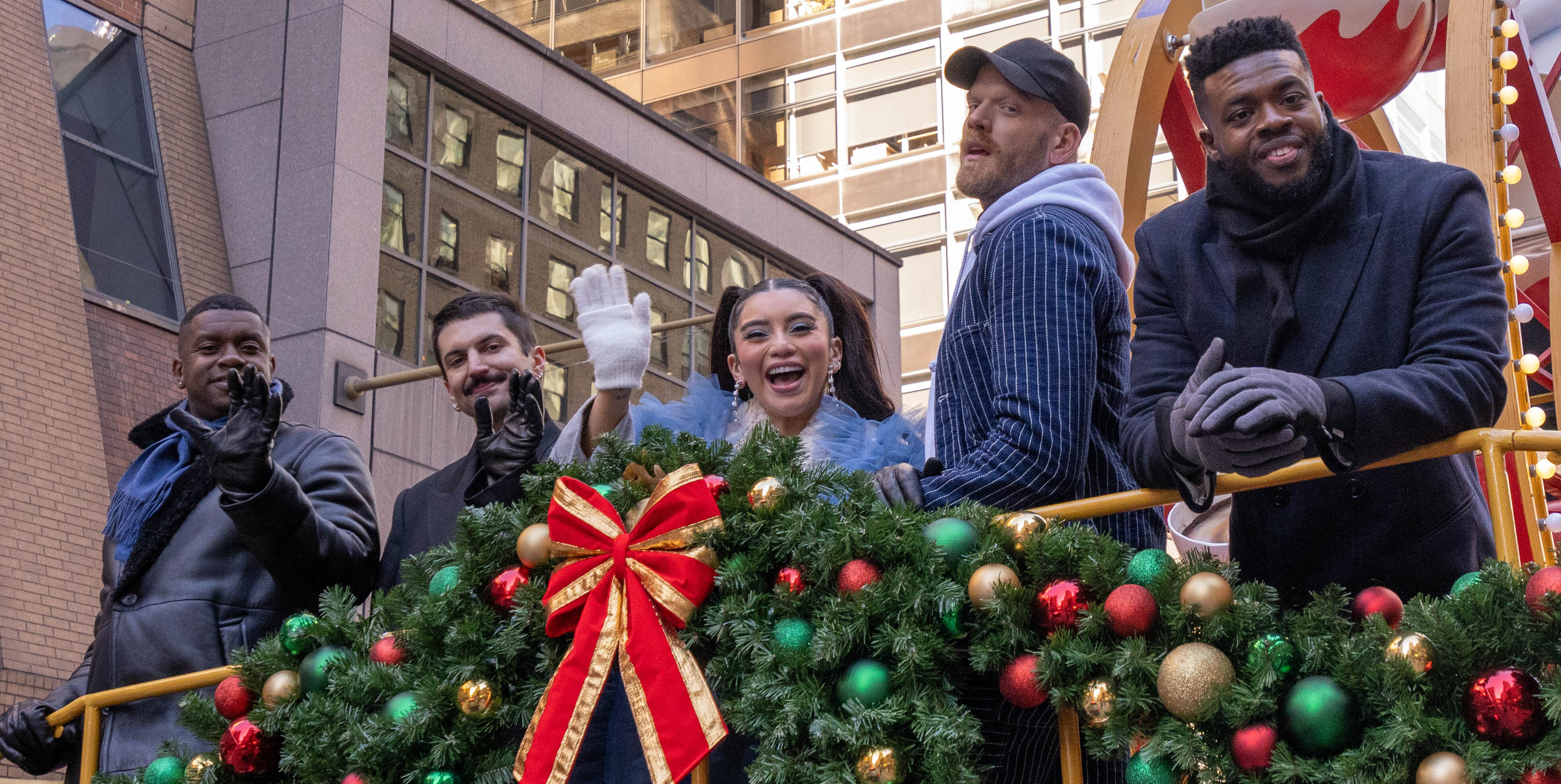
- Pentatonix at the Macy's Thanksgiving Day Parade in 2023. From left to right: Matt Sallee, Mitch Grassi, Kirstin Maldonado, Scott Hoying and Kevin Olusola

Background information
- Also known as: PTX
- Origin: Arlington, Texas, U.S.
- Genres: A cappella; pop; Christmas music
- Years active: 2011–present
- Labels: RCA; Madison Gate; Republic
- Spinoffs: Superfruit
- Members: Mitch Grassi; Kirstin Maldonado; Scott Hoying; Kevin Olusola; Matt Sallee
- Past members: Avi Kaplan
- Website: ptxofficial.com

YouTube information
- Channel: PTXofficial
- Genre: Music
- Subscribers: 20.5 million
- Views: 6.87 billion
- Last updated: July 18, 2026

Pentatonix (abbreviated PTX) is an American a cappella group from Arlington, Texas, consisting of the vocalists Scott Hoying, Mitch Grassi, Kirstin Maldonado, Matt Sallee, and Kevin Olusola. Characterized by their pop-style arrangements with vocal harmonies, scat singing, riffing, vocal percussion, and beatboxing, they produce cover versions of modern pop works or Christmas songs, sometimes in the form of medleys, along with original material. Pentatonix was formed in 2011 and subsequently won the third season of NBC's The Sing-Off, receiving $200,000 and a recording contract with Sony Music. When Sony's Epic Records dropped the group after The Sing-Off, the group launched its YouTube channel, distributing its music through Madison Gate Records, a label owned by Sony Pictures.

Their debut EP PTX, Volume 1 was released in 2012, followed by their holiday release PTXmas the same year, with Pentatonix's third release, PTX, Vol. II, debuting at number 1 on Billboard's Independent Albums chart and number 10 on the Billboard 200 in 2013. In May 2014, Pentatonix signed with RCA Records. That same year, the group released their fourth EP, PTX, Vol. III, two full-length studio albums; PTX, Vols. 1 & 2, a compilation album released in Japan, Korea and Australia, and their second holiday release, That's Christmas to Me. That's Christmas to Me was certified gold by the Recording Industry Association of America (RIAA), platinum on December 24, 2014, and double platinum on February 11, 2016, becoming the highest-charting holiday album by a group since 1962, and the fourth-best-selling album in the United States in 2014. The following year, Pentatonix released their eponymous album, their first consisting mostly of original material, which debuted atop the US Billboard 200 chart for the first time in their career, followed by a third Christmas album, A Pentatonix Christmas, in 2016, and a new EP, PTX, Vol. IV – Classics, the year after.

In September 2017, Avi Kaplan, the group's original bass, left the group and was replaced by Sallee, who was included on their album Pentatonix Christmas Deluxe and featured on their next album PTX Presents: Top Pop, Vol. I. Sallee graduated from Berklee College of Music, where he had been a member of the a cappella group Pitch Slapped.

Pentatonix has won three Grammy Awards: they were the first a cappella act to win Best Arrangement, Instrumental or A Cappella, doing so in 2015 and 2016, and Best Country Duo/Group Performance in 2017. On February 21, 2023, the group received a star on the Hollywood Walk of Fame.

== Career ==
=== Background ===
Pentatonix began with Kirstin Maldonado (born May 16, 1992), Mitch Grassi (born July 24, 1992), and Scott Hoying (born September 17, 1991), who grew up together and were schoolmates at Martin High School in Arlington, Texas. For a local radio show competition to meet the cast of Glee, they arranged and submitted a trio version of "Telephone," the hit song by Lady Gaga and featuring Beyoncé. Despite losing the competition, their singing sparked attention at their school, and they began performing. Their version of "Telephone" subsequently gained attention on YouTube.

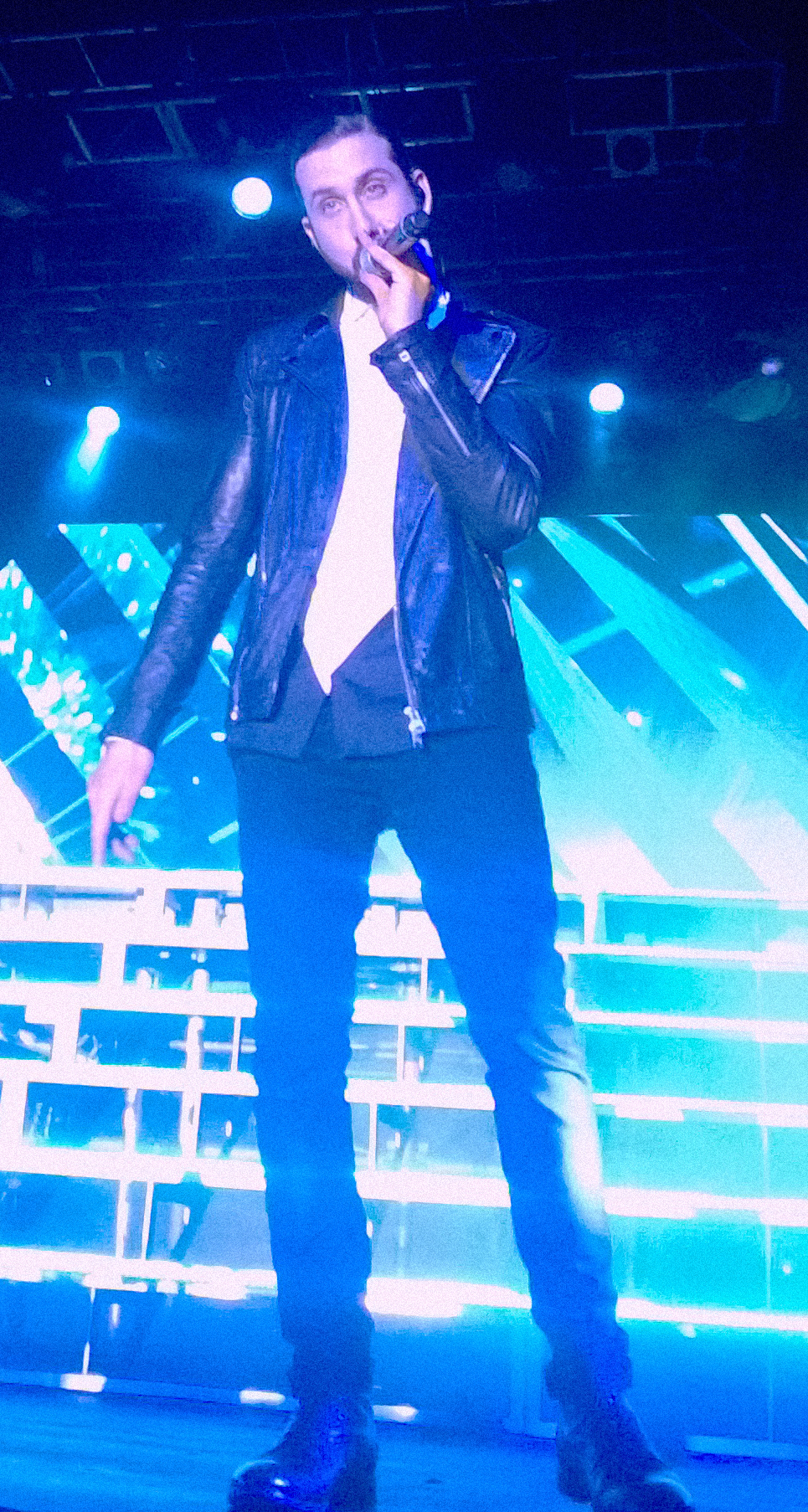
Avi Kaplan's basso profondo vocal range was a prominent element of Pentatonix's sound from the group's founding through his departure in 2017.

Hoying and Maldonado both graduated from Martin High School in 2010, Grassi in 2011. Hoying went off to the University of Southern California (USC) to pursue a degree in popular music performance, while Maldonado pursued a degree in musical theatre at the University of Oklahoma. While at USC, Scott Hoying joined an a cappella group called SoCal VoCals. He found out about The Sing-Off from another member of the group, Ben Bram (also their arranger, producer, and sound engineer), and was encouraged to audition for the show. He persuaded Maldonado and Grassi to join him, but Bram suggested having a bass and beatboxer as well to support the group. Through a mutual friend, Hoying met Avi Kaplan, a highly recognized vocal bass in the a cappella community. Then, the trio found Kevin Olusola on YouTube through one of his videos which had gone viral. Olusola was shown simultaneously beatboxing and playing the cello. Olusola was born in Owensboro, Kentucky, and graduated pre-med from Yale University.

The group met the day before the auditions for the third season of The Sing-Off began. The group successfully auditioned for the show and eventually went on to win the title for 2011 (season three).

Pentatonix, as suggested by Scott Hoying, is named after the pentatonic scale, a musical scale or mode with five notes per octave, representing the five members of the group. They replaced the last letter with an "x" to make it more appealing. The quintet derives its influences from pop, dubstep, electro, reggae, hip hop, and classical music.

=== The Sing-Off (2011) ===
Pentatonix performed the following songs on The Sing Off. The group did not perform in Episode 1 or 3.

Episode	Theme	Song choice	Original artist
2	Signature Songs	"E.T."	Katy Perry
4	Current Hits	"Your Love Is My Drug"	Ke$ha
4	1960s Favorites	"Piece of My Heart"	Erma Franklin (credited to Janis Joplin)
5	Guilty Pleasures	"Video Killed the Radio Star"	The Buggles
6	Hip-Hop	"Love Lockdown"	Kanye West
7	Superstar Medleys	Medley of "Oops!... I Did It Again", "Toxic" and "Hold It Against Me"	Britney Spears
8	Rock classics	"Born to be Wild"	Steppenwolf
8	Country hits	"Stuck Like Glue"	Sugarland
9	R&B	"OMG"	Usher (featuring will.i.am)
9	R&B	"Let's Get It On"	Marvin Gaye
10	Mastermix Medleys	"Forget You" / "Since U Been Gone"	Cee Lo Green / Kelly Clarkson
10	Judges' Choice	"Dog Days Are Over"	Florence and the Machine
11 (Finale)	First performance	"Without You"	David Guetta (feat. Usher)
11 (Finale)	Second performance	"Give Me Just One Night (Una Noche)"	98 Degrees (sung with host Nick Lachey)
11 (Finale)	Victory song	"Eye of the Tiger"	Survivor

=== PTX Vol. 1 and PTXMas (2011–13) ===
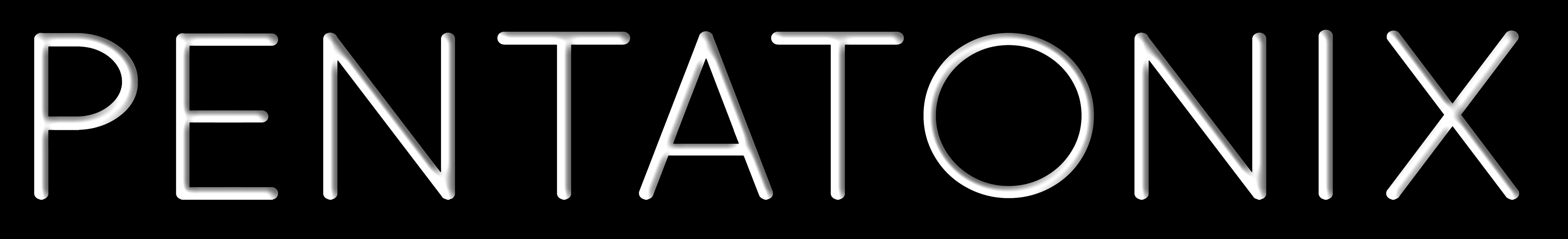
Pentatonix's logo

Scott Hoying and Kirstie Maldonado dropped out of college in hopes of winning The Sing-Off, while Mitch Grassi skipped his high school graduation to audition for the show. After they won, all of the members relocated to Los Angeles in order to pursue a career as recording artists. The main goal of the group was to become the first mainstream a cappella group in recent times.

In January 2012, having signed with Sony Pictures-owned label Madison Gate Records, the group began working on their first album with producer Ben Bram. During that six-month period of picking covers and writing originals, Pentatonix released covers of both popular and classic songs on YouTube. In interviews, the members mention that it was a way to stay relevant to their audience that enjoyed their work on "The Sing-Off", in addition to gaining new fans. Almost all of their covers, including "Somebody That I Used to Know" by Gotye featuring Kimbra, "Gangnam Style" by PSY and "We Are Young" by Fun, went viral on YouTube.

Their first EP, PTX, Volume 1, was released on June 26, 2012, charting at number 14 on the US Billboard 200 chart and number 5 on the digital chart. It sold 20,000 copies in its first week of release. The group promoted the album through press appearances on Access Hollywood, VH1 The Buzz, Marie, and local television shows. Pentatonix were also featured on the Chinese version of The Sing-Off as guests where Kevin showcased his fluency in Mandarin. Pentatonix also embarked on their first national headlining tour in the fall of 2012. The tour was sold-out and spanned 30 cities.

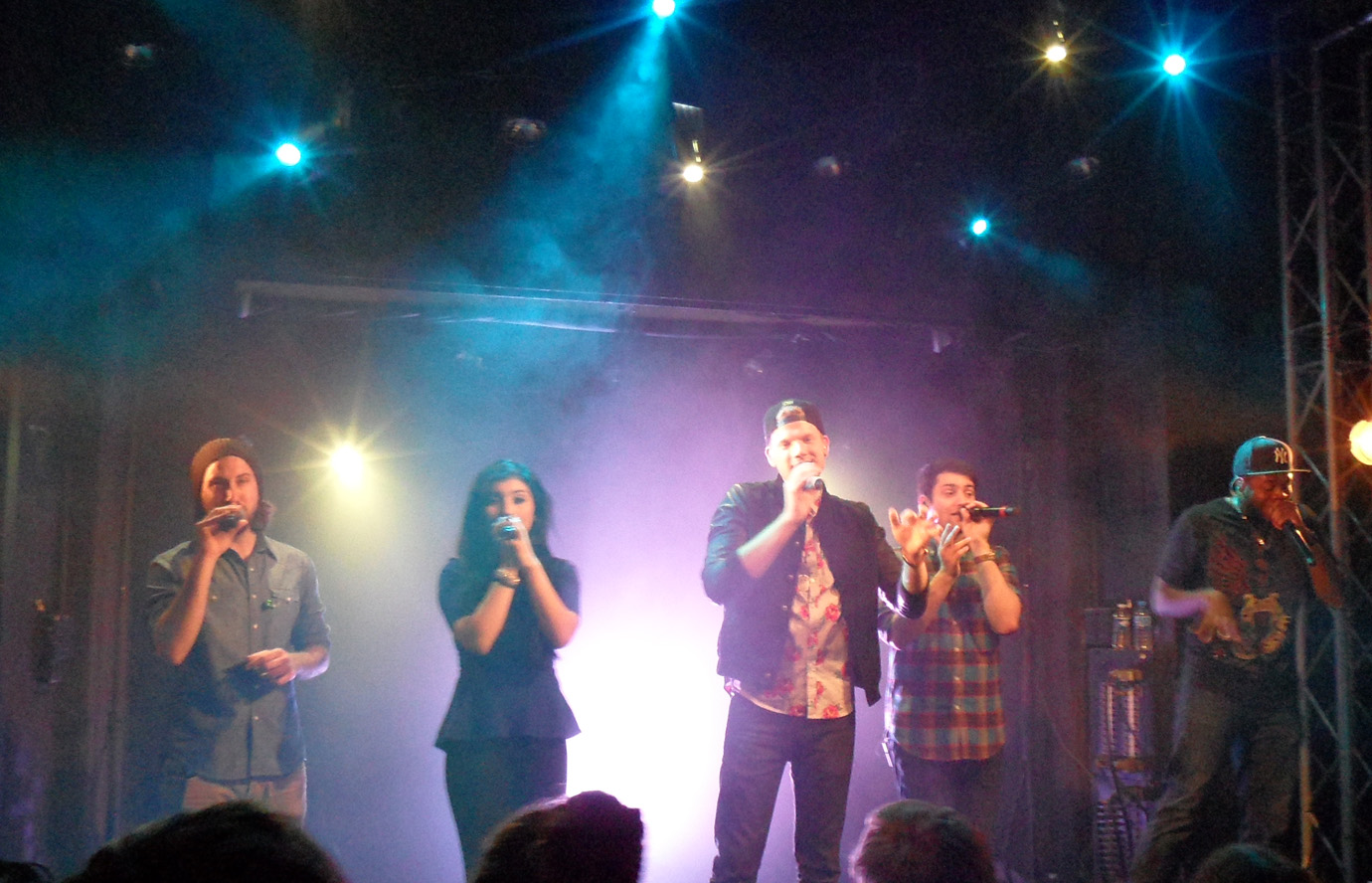
Pentatonix performing in Paris in 2013

The group released their Christmas EP, PTXmas, on November 19, 2012. The group released their video of an original arrangement of "Carol of the Bells" the following day. The group performed on "Coca-Cola Red Carpet LIVE! @ The 2012 American Music Awards" Pre-Show on November 18, the Hollywood Christmas Parade, and the "94.7 THE WAVE Christmas Concert Starring Dave Koz and Kenny Loggins" on December 16. The group was also featured guests on Katie Couric (ABC), Home and Family (Hallmark), The Tonight Show with Jay Leno, and Big D NYE. Ryan Seacrest's website named Pentatonix the 2012 "Featured Artist of the Year" for their expansive growth online in just one year. The Christmas album was re-released on November 19, 2013, as a deluxe edition containing two additional tracks. One of these, "Little Drummer Boy" charted in several Billboard categories including peaking at number two on the "Streaming Songs" chart and number one on the Holiday 100 chart, receiving a number of Billboard awards. PTXmas reappeared on the Billboard charts again in November 2014, placing No. 24 on the Billboard 200 and No. 4 on the Holiday charts, giving Pentatonix three albums on the Billboard 200 at the same time. On Billboard's 2014 Year-End charts, PTXmas was No. 8 on the Catalogue Albums chart and No. 119 on the Top Billboard 200 Albums chart, with Pentatonix ranked as No. 46 on the Top Billboard 200 Artists chart. As of December 24, 2014, PTXmas has sold 356,000 copies.

=== PTX Vol. II (2013–14) ===
The band went on their second national headlining tour from January 24, 2013, to May 11, 2013, and simultaneously wrote additional original material for their second EP, PTX, Vol. II. The group released the first single, a cover of Macklemore and Ryan Lewis' "Can't Hold Us" on August 20, 2013. The group also promoted PTX, Vol. II on The Ellen DeGeneres Show in November 2013, after the success of "The Evolution of Beyoncé" mashup on YouTube. That week, the band was featured on "Around the World with Diane Sawyer" and were named "Persons of the Week".

In March 2013, Pentatonix and violinist Lindsey Stirling released their cover of the Imagine Dragons song "Radioactive", and won for Response of the Year at the YouTube Music Awards. In July of the same year, along with American Idol contestant and fellow Arlington Texan Todrick Hall, they released "The Wizard of Ahhhs", which mashes up several songs to create one song. The music video follows the story of the 1939 film The Wizard of Oz with the artists dressed as its numerous lead roles.

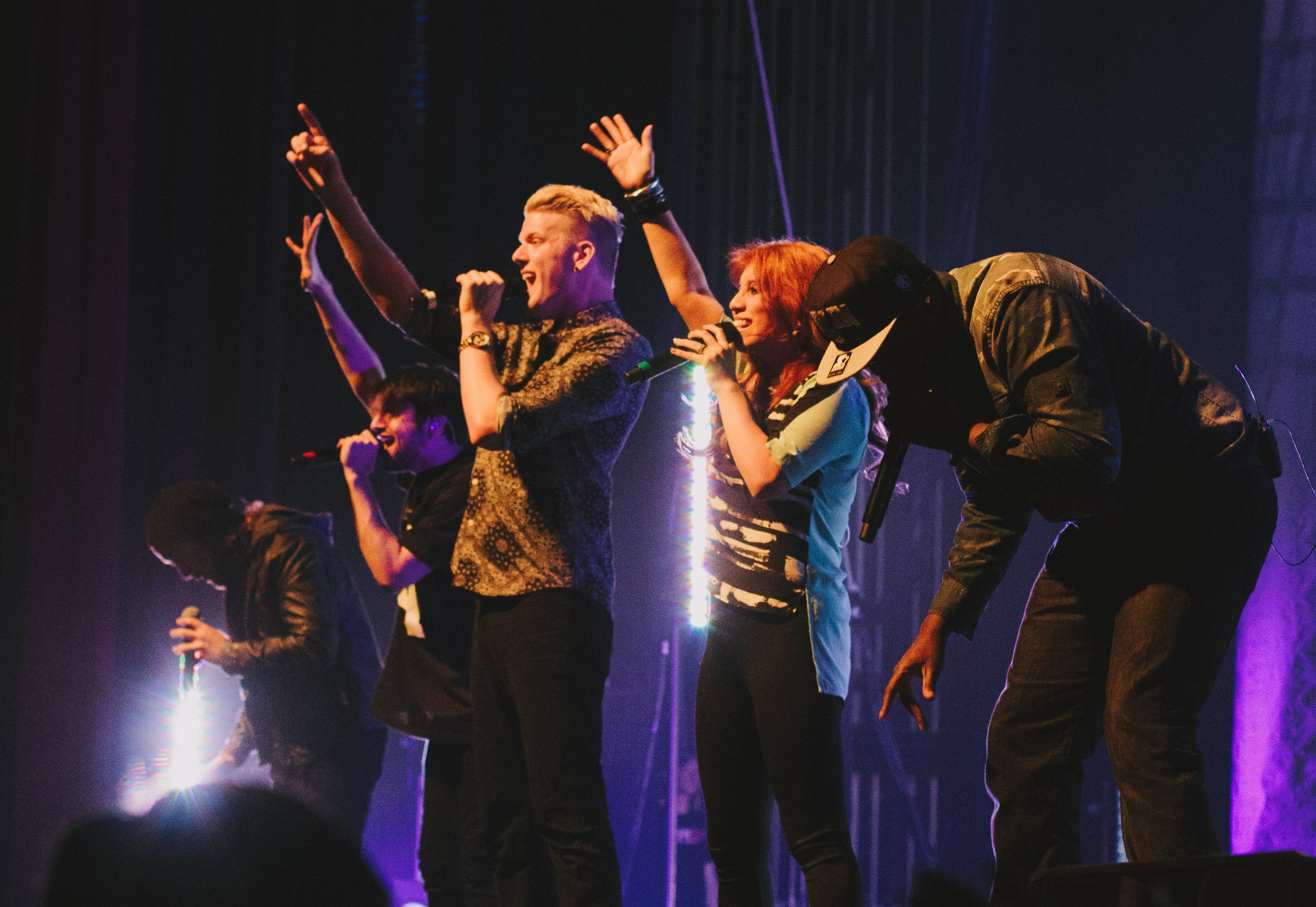
Pentatonix performing in St. Louis, Missouri in 2013.

PTX Vol. II was released on November 5, 2013, in conjunction with their second album single on YouTube: a medley of Daft Punk songs. The video went viral, garnering 100 million views in the first year. The medley was later nominated for and won Best Arrangement, Instrumental or a Cappella of the 57th Grammy Awards. PTX, Vol. II debuted at number ten on the Billboard 200 and number one on the Independent charts, selling 31,000 copies in the first week. Pentatonix subsequently re-released a deluxe version of PTXmas on November 18, 2013, with two new tracks, "Little Drummer Boy" and "Go Tell It On The Mountain". Their YouTube video of "Little Drummer Boy" peaked at number 13 on the Billboard Hot 100 chart for the week ending December 21, 2013.

In May 2014, Pentatonix signed with RCA Records, a "flagship" label of Sony Music Entertainment. On July 30, through the new label, the group released their first official album PTX, Vols. 1 & 2 in Japan, containing all of the songs from their two namesake EPs and four additional tracks, previously released as singles.

=== PTX Vol. III and That's Christmas to Me (2014) ===
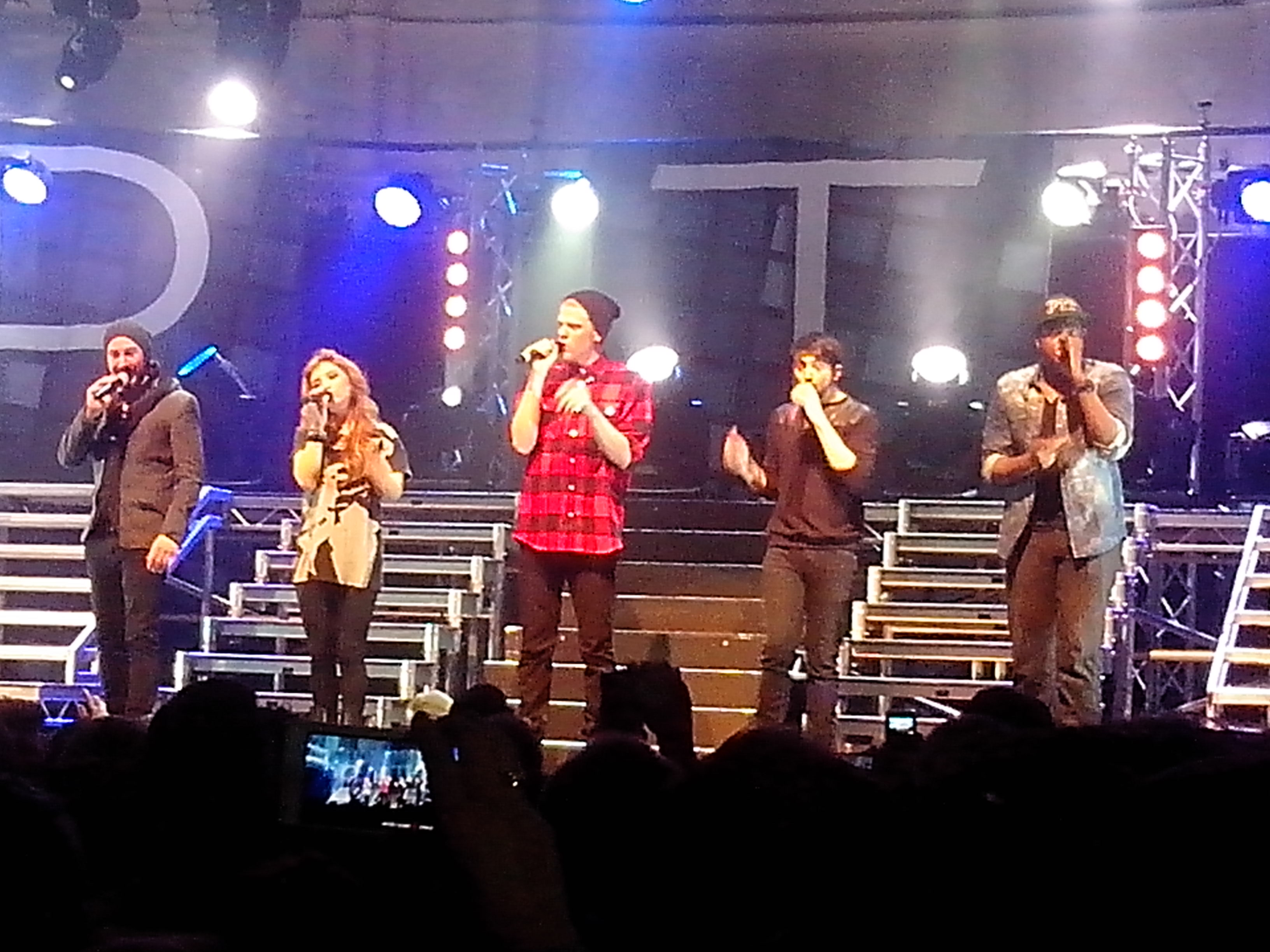
Pentatonix performing at a concert in 2014

On August 7, 2014, Pentatonix announced that their third EP PTX, Vol. III would be released on September 23, 2014. The EP went up for pre-order on iTunes on August 11, 2014, and included a download of two tracks from the EP, "Problem" and "La La Latch". PTX Vol. III debuted at number 5 on the Billboard 200.

The group also revealed on August a second full-length Christmas album, That's Christmas to Me, titled after the title track of the album, an original song that was penned by Pentatonix themselves. The album was released on October 21, 2014 and peaked at number 2 on the Billboard 200, and number 4 on the Billboard Canadian Albums chart. A single from the album, the group's cover of "Mary, Did You Know?", both debuted and peaked on the Billboard Hot 100 chart at number 26, at number 7 on Billboard's Adult Contemporary chart, and at number 44 on the Billboard Canadian Hot 100 chart. Another single "That's Christmas To Me", the title track from the album, also peaked at number 8 on the Billboard Adult Contemporary chart.

Pentatonix is also the first act to top both the Holiday Albums and Holiday Songs charts simultaneously since the Holiday 100 launched as a multi-metric tabulation in December 2011. The album is also the highest charting Holiday album by a group since 1962.

During the holiday season, 7 songs from That's Christmas to Me charted on Billboard's Holiday Digital Songs chart. On December 10, 2014 That's Christmas to Me was certified gold by the Recording Industry Association of America. On December 24, 2014, the album was certified Platinum. By year's end (December 31, 2014), Billboard reported the album had reached a total of 1.14 million copies sold—becoming the 4th best selling album of 2014 by any artist of any genre (being surpassed only by Taylor Swift's 1989, the Frozen Soundtrack, and Sam Smith's In the Lonely Hour) and was the Top Selling Holiday Album for 2014. On February 11, 2016, the album was certified Double Platinum.

=== Self-titled album, A Pentatonix Christmas, and PTX, Vol. IV (2015–2017) ===
In late December, Scott Hoying stated that for 2015, "Pentatonix is transitioning towards original music." A release of a full-length album consisting of only original material was planned. Hoying also stated, "We're at the point in our careers now [where] we must go to original music, and we want to go to original music; we have so much to say, and I think it's gonna be quite a journey."

On August 28, 2015, Pentatonix announced on social media that a self-titled album, the group's third full-length album and first album made of mostly original music, would be released on October 16, 2015.

On September 4, 2015, Pentatonix released "Can't Sleep Love" the first single from their upcoming album of original songs. On September 18, 2015, a second version featuring Tink was released online. On October 9, 2015, Pentatonix released their second single, a cover of Jack Ü and Justin Bieber's "Where Are Ü Now". The album ended up being released one day early as a surprise gift to their fans. On that same day, Pentatonix released their third single, "Sing". The album debuted at number 1 on the US Billboard 200. In the US, the album started with 98,000 units (88,000 in pure album sales). On February 8, 2016, the album was certified Gold.

On April 14, 2016, the music video was released for Pentatonix's cover with Jason Derulo of Shai's "If I Ever Fall In Love". In August 2016, the music video of Pentatonix's "Perfume Medley," a medley of songs by the Japanese girl group Perfume, was also released. The medley consisted of the songs "Spending All My Time", "Pick Me Up", "Chocolate Disco", and "Polyrhythm".

Their second full-length Christmas album, titled A Pentatonix Christmas, was released on October 21, 2016. It features 11 songs, including the two originals "The Christmas Sing-Along" and "Good to Be Bad". It debuted on the Billboard 200 at number three with 52,000 albums sold in its first week, and later peaked at number one. The album also debuted atop the Billboard Holiday Albums chart, their second number one on that chart after That's Christmas to Me.

Their fifth EP, PTX, Vol. IV – Classics, was released on April 7, 2017. It marked a departure from the group's typical sound, focusing on covers of standards of rock, blues, country, and older pop music.

=== New bass, Top Pop, Vol. I, Christmas Is Here!, and The Best of Pentatonix Christmas (2017–2019) ===
In May 2017, the band announced in a YouTube video that Avi Kaplan would leave the group following their upcoming tour. The split was amicable and centered on his inability to keep up with the touring demands of the group, and deal with the distance from his family.

On July 31, the group released the single "Dancing on My Own", a cover of the song by Robyn, their first release without Kaplan (although he was still a member at the time, as the tour was ongoing). Olusola performed cello on the song in lieu of a bass vocalist.

Kaplan performed his last concert with Pentatonix on September 3, 2017, in Essex Junction, Vermont. On October 13, Hoying introduced Matt Sallee as the group's new bass. The band's first official releases with Sallee were the songs from the deluxe edition of A Pentatonix Christmas, which was released on November 27, 2017. Sallee is also featured on their cover of the Camila Cabello song "Havana", which was released as a single from their Top Pop Vol. 1 album on February 23, 2018.

On February 27, 2018, the group announced via their social media the upcoming release a new album titled PTX Presents: Top Pop, Vol. I on April 13, 2018, to be followed by a tour in the summer. It marked their first album with Sallee and without Kaplan. It was preceded by three singles: their cover of "Havana", a medley of Dua Lipa's "New Rules" and Aaliyah's "Are You That Somebody?" titled "New Rules x Are You That Somebody?", which they released along with a music video on March 9, and a cover of Charlie Puth's "Attention", which they released along with a music video on March 23.

On September 20, 2018, the group announced their third full-length holiday album titled Christmas Is Here! to be released on October 26 of the same year and The Christmas Is Here! Tour to accompany the album. They also announced the first single from the album, a cover of "Making Christmas" from The Nightmare Before Christmas which was released on September 28. The album was released on October 26, 2018.

On October 25, 2019, Pentatonix released their newest Christmas album, a greatest hits compilation album called The Best of Pentatonix Christmas. It includes mostly older songs, plus some new ones, such as a cover of "Do You Hear What I Hear" with posthumous vocals from Whitney Houston and "You're a Mean One, Mr. Grinch," the latter featuring Sallee on lead.

=== At Home, We Need a Little Christmas, and The Lucky Ones (2020–2021) ===
On June 26, 2020, the group released another EP, At Home, containing five new covers, plus a 13-song medley, a total of 6 tracks. The EP contains Pentatonix covering Billie Eilish's "When the Party's Over", Dua Lipa's "Break My Heart", the Cranberries' "Dreams", The Weeknd's "Blinding Lights", and Clean Bandit's "Cologne". Each member recorded their arrangement separately in their homes due to them having to quarantine because of COVID-19.

On November 13, 2020, the group released their fourth Christmas-themed studio album, We Need a Little Christmas. The album includes hits such as their covers of "Amazing Grace (My Chains Are Gone)", which was released as a single on November 25, 2020, and "12 Days of Christmas". It also includes an original song, "Thank You".

On August 14, 2020, Pentatonix released "Happy Now", their first original single in five years, and the first of an upcoming album of original content. On October 14, Pentatonix released "Be My Eyes", and announced the date of The Lucky Ones, the first full-length album of originals since 2015, for February 12, 2021. Like At Home and We Need a Little Christmas, it was recorded in isolation because of the pandemic. A music video for "Coffee in Bed" was released on the same day as the album. The album received general critical acclaim. The deluxe version released on September 10, 2021, with new songs like "Anchor", "Petals", "Midnight in Tokyo" (ft. Little Glee Monster), and more.

=== Evergreen, Holidays Around the World, and The Greatest Christmas Hits (2021–2024) ===
On September 27, 2021, Pentatonix announced their fifth upcoming Christmas-themed album, Evergreen, and released the single "It's Been a Long, Long Time" on the same day. They later released their rendition of "I Just Called to Say I Love You" as a single. Their renditions of "Over the River" with Lindsey Stirling and "The Prayer" were also released as singles. The album was released on October 29, 2021. The title track is an original song. The tour for the album, "Pentatonix: The Evergreen Christmas Tour 2021," began on November 27, 2021. The album was nominated for the best traditional pop vocal album at the 2023 Grammy Awards. Following the album the group released a 70-track compilation album of previously released Christmas music called "White Christmas."

On September 21, 2022, they announced their sixth Christmas album, Holidays Around the World, and released the single "Prayers for This World" the same day. The album focuses on celebrating different cultures during the holiday season, and includes new versions of songs previously released by the band plus four originals: "Kid on Christmas" with Meghan Trainor, "Star on Top", "Prayers For This World", and "Invincible". The album was released October 28, 2022. The group also announced their 2022 North American Christmas tour "Pentatonix: A Christmas Spectacular". It was preceded by a one-off show at the Hollywood Bowl with Darren Criss on September 29. The tour began on November 17 in Oakland, California.

On December 9, 2022, they released a second version of "Do You Hear What I Hear" with Matteo, Virginia, and Andrea Bocelli, which appeared in the deluxe edition of the Bocelli album A Family Christmas released in 2023.

On August 11, 2023, Pentatonix released a new original single called "I Rise". In September 2023, they announced another Christmas compilation album called The Greatest Christmas Hits on their website, which was followed by a subsequent tour. On September 25, 2023, they released the lead single, "Please Santa Please". The album was released on October 20, 2023, and features 8 new songs.

In 2024, the group released the single "Meet Me Next Christmas" for the romantic comedy film of the same name.

Pentatonix live on stage, 2025

=== Christmas in the City (2025–present) ===
In early 2025, Pentatonix signed to Republic Records. On September 25, 2025, the group announced their seventh Christmas-themed album "Christmas in the City", which was released on October 24, 2025. They also released an original single, "Bah Humbug". They embarked on the Christmas in the City tour in North America starting on November 8 in West Valley City, Utah. This album includes their collaboration with Frank Sinatra on his 1960 recording of "I've Got My Love to Keep Me Warm" which reached Number 1 on the Billboard Adult Contemporary Chart, in December, 2025.

In February and July 2026, Pentatonix released two original singles: "Heaven on Earth" and "Sacrifice".

On August 6, 2026, the group announced Christmas in the City Deluxe, and released a new single: "Get Happy / Happy Days Are Here Again". The album features 10 new songs, seven live performances, and two new covers. It was released on October 30.

== Other media ==
=== Tours ===
Pentatonix embarked on their first national headlining tour in autumn of 2012. The tour spanned 30 cities. The band went on their second national headlining tour from January 24, 2013, to May 11, 2013, and simultaneously wrote additional original material for their second EP, PTX, Vol. II.

In 2014, Pentatonix undertook an extensive tour that included the United States, Canada, Europe and South East Asia.

In 2015, Pentatonix began the North American leg of their "On My Way Home Tour", which began February 25, 2015, in California and ended at Grand Prairie's Verizon Theatre on March 29. The group started a European tour in Portugal on April 9. This European leg ended in Glasgow on May 6. The Southeast Asian leg of the tour began in Seoul, South Korea on May 28. The last show of this leg was on Jun 16 in Osaka, Japan.

Pentatonix opened for Kelly Clarkson on her Piece by Piece Tour. During Clarkson's set the group performed "Heartbeat Song" with her. Due to Clarkson's doctor's requests for vocal rest, the tour was canceled 15 shows early.

In 2016, Pentatonix embarked on the first leg of their "Pentatonix World Tour" with Us The Duo. The tour began on April 2, 2016, in Chiba, Japan. The second leg ran from May 23 through June 26 in Europe before returning to Japan for two shows in August 2016. The third and fourth legs of the tour (in Oceania and Asia respectively) occurred in September 2016, followed by the fifth leg in North America from October 17 to November 22, 2016. The tour's 2017 shows kicked off in May with another five shows in Japan. The final leg of the tour began July 2, 2017, in Los Angeles and continued across the United States before concluding in Vermont on September 3, 2017. The last show marked Kaplan's final performance with the group.

=== Performances ===
In September 2012, Pentatonix were invited to perform several of their songs ("Somebody That I Used to Know" by Gotye and "We Are Young" by fun.) on the Chinese edition of the Sing-Off. In addition, they covered the late Taiwanese pop star Teresa Teng's song, Tian Mi Mi.

Pentatonix appeared and performed on The Today Show, The Tonight Show With Jay Leno, The Talk and Conan. The group also returned to The Sing-Off, performing their cover version of Ellie Goulding's "I Need Your Love" during the Season 4 finale episode, which aired on December 23, 2013.

In November 2014, Pentatonix were invited by Baz Luhrmann to be involved with the Holiday Window display at Barneys in New York City. Each window had a theme such as "love," "beauty," "truth" and "freedom" with its own soundtrack, recorded by Pentatonix. Pentatonix also performed at the opening night, as well as the "after-party" for invited guests.

On November 27, 2014, Pentatonix participated in the annual Macy's Thanksgiving Parade in New York City, performing "Santa Claus is Coming to Town" on the Homewood Suites float.

Pentatonix also performed during NBC's annual Christmas in Rockefeller Center special on December 3, 2014, performing "Sleigh Ride" and "Santa Claus is Coming to Town".

Pentatonix returned to The Sing-Off, performing a medley of songs from That's Christmas to Me during the Season 5 holiday special, which aired on December 17, 2014.

On December 7, 2014, Pentatonix appeared in The Kennedy Center Honors award presentation, as part of a presentation to actor Tom Hanks, singing the song "That Thing You Do", from Hanks' film of the same name. President Barack Obama and First Lady Michelle Obama were in the audience. The show was broadcast on CBS on December 30, 2014.

On December 31, 2014, Pentatonix appeared as part of ABC Television Network's Dick Clark's New Year's Rockin' Eve with Ryan Seacrest 2015, performing from the Billboard Hollywood party hosted by Fergie.

In December 2014, Pentatonix were invited to perform on the final episode of Wetten, dass..?, a longstanding entertainment show in Germany, performing a medley of songs from artists that have been on the program over the years.

On August 1, 2019, Pentatonix played to their largest ever live crowd (as of August 2019) at the closing ceremony of the 24th World Scout Jamboree at the Summit Bechtel Reserve in Glen Jean, West Virginia.

On September 1, 2019, Pentatonix performed a rainy, nighttime show at the 173rd Canfield Fair in Mahoning County, Ohio, for more than 8,000 people. This set a "number of advanced sales," record for JAC Management Group, LLC since taking over Canfield Fair entertainment operations.

=== Appearances and presentations ===
Pentatonix appeared on Sesame Street on February 7, 2014.

Pentatonix were presenters at the 2014 American Music Awards, introducing a performance by Jessie J, Ariana Grande, and Nicki Minaj. The group was also featured in the "YouTube Rewind 2014" video as one of the most subscribed YouTube music channels.

Pentatonix appeared on the Disney Channel show, K.C. Undercover on June 14, 2015.

On The Muppets, they were guest stars in the episode "Pigs in a Blackout", which aired on November 10, 2015.

Maldonado, Hoying, and Grassi appeared as members of a cappella groups in the Fox television show Bones, in the episode "The Strike In the Chord" that originally aired on May 19, 2016.

They made a guest appearance on The Voice on November 24, 2016, where they sang their rendition of "Jolene" alongside Miley Cyrus and the song's writer and original performer, Dolly Parton.

On December 14, 2016, the group hosted their first Christmas special, titled around their current album, A Pentatonix Christmas Special. The hour-long special aired on NBC and featured guest appearances by Reba McEntire, Dolly Parton and Kelly Clarkson. NBC broadcast Pentatonix Christmas specials in 2017 and 2018 as well.

In December 2018, the group made a guest appearance on Darci Lynne: My Hometown Christmas.

On December 11, 2018, they performed "Rockin' Around the Christmas Tree" on The Talk.

On October 14, 2020, Pentatonix performed "Higher Love" at the 2020 Billboard Music Awards with Kelly Clarkson and Sheila E.

In 2023, Pentatonix competed in season nine of The Masked Singer as "California Roll" where they each had their own varying costume. With the group consisting of five members, they were the largest group contestant on the show. After besting Grandmaster Flash as "Polar Bear" and Bishop Briggs as "Medusa" (who was saved by Nicole Scherzinger ringing the "Ding Dong Keep It On Bell") on "New York Night", they performed their own rendition of Radiohead's "Creep" in the quarter-finals and finished in third place during the semi-finals. They have since announced that they will be taking their performances from the show on tour.

In 2024, the group appeared on the Simpsons episode "O C'mon All Ye Faithful".

=== Film ===
Pentatonix had a cameo role in Pitch Perfect 2, released in May 2015, as the Canadian team competing against the Barden Bellas.

Pentatonix also released a documentary about the group's journey titled "On My Way Home" (based on the original song of the same name from PTX, Vol. III and the group's 2015 tour) on June 18, 2015, which was promoted on social media through the hashtag #OnMyWayHomeProject.

They also appeared in TV series Bones, broadcast in May 2016, in the episode "The Strike in the Chord" (season 11, episode 16). They sing in two different a cappella choirs in a college.

Disney announced at the D23 Expo event in Anaheim, California, a brand new holiday unscripted special, "Pentatonix: Around the World for the Holidays" that would come to Disney+ in the 2022 holiday season. It premiered on December 2, 2022. The plot of the special is that Pentatonix is struggling to find inspiration for their annual holiday album, but when they are sent on a whirlwind tour around the world, the group learns that "wherever we find ourselves, the holidays offer the perfect opportunity to discover how much we have in common and that it really is a small world, after all!" The special was produced by Done and Dusted, executive producers are Ashley Edens, David Jammy, Katy Mullan. The cast includes Pentatonix – Mitch Grassi, Scott Hoying, Kirstin Maldonado, Kevin Olusola, Matt Sallee and Nico Santos as the manager.

Pentatonix also appeared in the 2023 Amazon Prime movie Candy Cane Lane starring Eddie Murphy. Pentatonix appeared as a group of side characters known as The Carolers who were cursed to be living glass figurines by the movie's antagonist Pepper the Elf (portrayed by Jillian Bell) while also voicing the Carolers' glass figurine forms. The Carolers communicated only through Christmas carols and were the subject of several jokes in the movie.

They also appeared in the 2024 Netflix romantic comedy film Meet Me Next Christmas.

== Awards and nominations ==
Daytime Emmy Awards
Year	Category	Work	Result	Ref.
2017	Outstanding Musical Performance in a Daytime Program	"God Rest Ye Merry Gentlemen" on Rachael Ray	Nominated	

Grammy Awards
Year	Category	Work	Result	Ref.
2015	Best Arrangement, Instrumental or A Cappella	"Daft Punk"	Won	
2016	Best Arrangement, Instrumental or A Cappella	"Dance of the Sugar Plum Fairy"	Won	
2017	Best Country Duo/Group Performance	"Jolene" (with Dolly Parton)	Won	
2023	Best Traditional Pop Vocal Album	Evergreen	Nominated	
2024	Best Traditional Pop Vocal Album	Holidays Around the World	Nominated	

Streamy Awards
Year	Category	Work	Result	Ref.
2014	Best Cover Song	"Daft Punk"	Won	
2014	Best Original Song	"Love Again"	Nominated	
2014	Best Musical Artist	Pentatonix	Nominated	
2015	Best Collaboration	Pentatonix and Lindsey Stirling	Nominated	
2015	Best Cover Song	"Evolution of Michael Jackson"	Nominated	

YouTube Music Awards
Year	Category	Work	Result	Ref.
2013	Response of the Year	"Radioactive" (with Lindsey Stirling)	Won	
2015	Artist of the Year	Pentatonix	Won	

Shorty Awards
Year	Category	Work	Result	Ref.
2015	Best YouTube Musician	Pentatonix	Won	

Billboard Music Awards
Year	Category	Work	Result	Ref.
2015	Top Billboard 200 Album	That's Christmas to Me	Nominated	
2015	Top Billboard 200 Artist	Pentatonix	Nominated	

Nickelodeon Kids' Choice Awards
Year	Category	Work	Result	Ref.
2016	Favorite Music Group	Pentatonix	Nominated	
2017	Favorite Music Group	Pentatonix	Nominated	

IHeartRadio Music Awards
Year	Category	Work	Result	Ref.
2016	Best Cover Song	"Cheerleader"	Nominated	

Webby Awards
Year	Category	Work	Result	Ref.
2016	Video Remixes/Mashups	Evolution of Michael Jackson	Nominated	

Contemporary A Cappella Recording Awards
Year	Category	Work	Result	Ref.
2013	Best Pop/Rock Album	PTX, Volume 1	Won	
2013	Best Pop/Rock Song	"Starships"	Won	
2013	Best Soul/R&B Song	"The Baddest Girl"	Won	
2013	Best Holiday Album	PTXmas	Won	
2013	Best Holiday Song	"Carol of the Bells"	Won	
2014	Best Pop/Rock Album	PTX, Vol. II	Runner-up	
2014	Best Pop/Rock Song	"Daft Punk"	Won	
2014	Best Soul/R&B/Hip-Hop Song	"Hey Momma / Hit the Road Jack"	Won	
2014	Best Holiday Song	"Little Drummer Boy"	Nominated	
2014	Best Professional Original Song	"Run to You"	Runner-up	
2016	Best Pop/Rock Album	Pentatonix	Won	
2016	Best Original Song by a Professional Group	"Sing"	Runner-up	
2016	Best Pop/Rock Song	"Can't Sleep Love"	Nominated	
2016	Best Non-Scholastic Arrangement	"Can't Sleep Love"	Nominated	
2016	Best Non-Scholastic Video	"Can't Sleep Love"	Runner-up	
2017	Best Classical Song	"Coventry Carol"	Won	
2017	Best Folk/World Song	"O Come, All Ye Faithful"	Nominated	
2017	Best Holiday Album	A Pentatonix Christmas	Won	
2017	Best Holiday Song	"The Christmas Sing-Along"	Won	
2017	Best Jazz Song	"Good to Be Bad"	Nominated	
2017	Best Pop/Rock Song	"Hallelujah"	Won	
2018	Best Country Song	"Jolene"	Runner-up	
2018	Best Rock Song	"Bohemian Rhapsody"	Runner-up	
2019	Best Holiday Album	Christmas Is Here!	Won	
2019	Best Holiday Song	"Grown-Up Christmas List" (with Kelly Clarkson)	Won	
2019	Best Collaborative / Studio Project Song	"Grown-Up Christmas List" (with Kelly Clarkson)	Nominated	
2019	Best Pop Album	PTX Presents: Top Pop, Vol. I	Runner-up	
2019	Best Pop Song	"Havana"	Won	
2019	Best Religious Song	"When You Believe"	Won	
2019	Best Show Tunes / Soundtrack / Theme Song	"Making Christmas"	Nominated	

A Cappella Video Awards
Year	Category	Work	Result	Ref.
2017	Best Pop/Rock Video	"Sing"	Won	
2017	Best Video by a Professional Group	"Sing"	Won	
2017	Outstanding Costume / Makeup	"Can't Sleep Love"	Won	
2018	Outstanding Collaborative Video	"O Come All Ye Faithful"	Nominated	
2018	Best Folk / World Video	"O Come All Ye Faithful"	Runner-up	
2018	Best Holiday Video	"O Come All Ye Faithful"	Nominated	
2018	Best Religious Video	"O Come All Ye Faithful"	Runner-up	
2018	Outstanding Live Video	"Gold"	Nominated	
2018	Outstanding Special / Visual Effects / Animation	"Coldest Winter"	Won	
2018	Best Electronic / Experimental Video	"Coldest Winter"	Nominated	
2018	Outstanding Video Editing	"God Rest Ye Merry Gentlemen"	Nominated	
2018	Best Video by a Professional Group	"Hallelujah"	Runner-up	
2018	Best Pop Video	"Imagine"	Won	
2018	Best Rock Video	"Bohemian Rhapsody"	Runner-up	
2019	Outstanding Collaborative Video	"How Great Thou Art" (with Jennifer Hudson)	Runner-up	
2019	Outstanding Live Video	"How Great Thou Art" (with Jennifer Hudson)	Nominated	
2019	Best Religious Video	"How Great Thou Art" (with Jennifer Hudson)	Runner-up	
2019	Best Video by a Professional Group	"New Rules x Are You That Somebody?"	Nominated	
2019	Best Holiday Video	"Away in a Manger"	Nominated	
2019	Best Pop Video	"Havana"	Won	
2019	Best Rock Video	"Attention"	Runner-up	
2020	Best Electronic / Experimental Video	"Come Along"	Nominated	

== Discography ==
=== Studio albums ===
- PTX, Vols. 1 & 2 (2014)
- PTX (2014)
- That's Christmas to Me (2014)
- Pentatonix (2015)
- A Pentatonix Christmas (2016)
- PTX Presents: Top Pop, Vol. I (2018)
- Christmas Is Here! (2018)
- We Need a Little Christmas (2020)
- The Lucky Ones (2021)
- Evergreen (2021)
- Holidays Around the World (2022)
- Christmas in the City (2025)

=== Compilation albums ===
- The Best of Pentatonix Christmas (2019)
- White Christmas (2021)
- The Greatest Christmas Hits (2023)

== Members ==
Current members

- Mitch Grassi (2011–present)
- Scott Hoying (2011–present)
- Kirstin Maldonado (2011–present)
- Kevin Olusola (2011–present)
- Matt Sallee (2017–present)

Former member

- Avi Kaplan (2011–2017)

Timeline

== Concert tours ==
Headlining

- VIP Tour (2012–2014)
- On My Way Home Tour (2015)
- Pentatonix World Tour (2016–2017)
- A Pentatonix Christmas Tour (2017)
- PTX Summer Tour 2018 (2018)
- Christmas Is Here Tour (2018)
- Pentatonix: The World Tour (2019–2023)
- Pentatonix: The Evergreen Christmas Tour (2021)
- Pentatonix: A Christmas Spectacular (2022)
- Pentatonix: The Most Wonderful Tour of the Year (2023)
- PTX Summer 2024 (2024)
- Pentatonix: Hallelujah! It's A Christmas Tour (2024)
- Pentatonix: Christmas in the City Tour (2025)
- Pentatonix: UK / European Tour (2026)

Supporting

- Piece by Piece Tour with Kelly Clarkson (2015)

== See also ==
- Superfruit, a musical/comedy duo consisting of Pentatonix members Mitch Grassi and Scott Hoying.
