= Dave Pierce =

Canadian composer and producer

- Born: July 10, 1968 (age 57); Drayton Valley, Alberta, Canada
- Occupation(s): Songwriter, composer, producer, and arranger

Dave Pierce (born July 10, 1972) is a Canadian songwriter, composer, producer, and arranger. He was the music director for the opening, closing, and victory ceremonies of the 2010 Winter Olympics in Vancouver.Pierce received an Emmy Award for Outstanding Music Direction for his work on these ceremonies. He has also worked on arrangements for Broadway and Las Vegas productions.

Pierce has collaborated with a variety of performers, including Michael Bublé, Loreena McKennitt, Petula Clark, Carrie Underwood, Paul Brandt, Ian Tyson, Jann Arden, Jorane, Bryan Adams, Sarah McLachlan, Nelly Furtado and k.d. lang. In addition, he was commissioned to compose a symphonic work for Queen Elizabeth II.

== Career ==
Pierce was born in Drayton Valley, Alberta. He graduated from the Berklee College of Music in 1992. Pierce has been involved in productions such as Radio City Music Hall’s Christmas Spectacular, the Grey Cup halftime show, and the Gemini Awards. As an orchestrator, he has adapted scores for Broadway National Tours, including Chicago, The Music of Andrew Lloyd Webber Concert Tour, Thoroughly Modern Millie, 42nd Street, Crazy for You, Dr. Dolittle, and Annie Get Your Gun.

Pierce was the director of music for the 2010 Olympics in Vancouver. His compositions were played at the opening and closing ceremonies, and the daily medal presentations. Pierce produced the CDs Sounds of Vancouver 2010: Opening Ceremony Commemorative Album and the Sounds of Vancouver 2010: Closing Ceremony Commemorative Album, featuring artists from the ceremonies. He conducted all but one of the recording orchestras.
