= Matt Sallee =

American singer (born 1994)

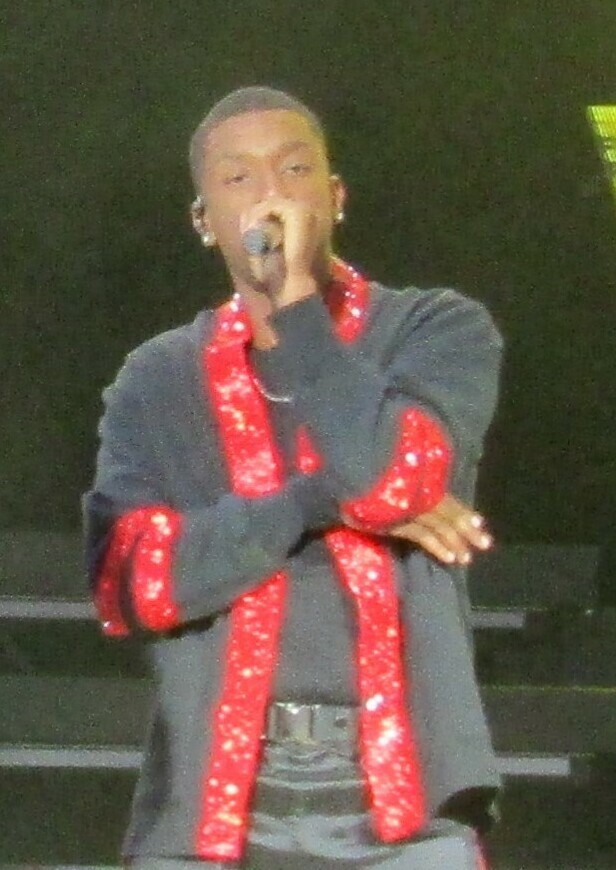
- Sallee performing in 2018

Background information
- Born: Matthew Levon Sallee; February 11, 1994 (age 32); Baltimore, Maryland, U.S.
- Origin: La Plata, Maryland, U.S.
- Genres: A cappella; pop
- Occupations: Singer; songwriter
- Years active: 2017–present
- Member of: Pentatonix
- Spouse: Sarah Bishop (m. 2022)

Matthew Levon Sallee (born February 11, 1994) is an American singer known for being the vocal bass of the a cappella group Pentatonix. Sallee is the newest member of the group, replacing Avi Kaplan following his departure in 2017.

== Early life and education ==
Matthew Levon Sallee was born on February 11, 1994, in Baltimore, Maryland. At age 4, he started singing in his church's choir that his father was the pastor of. Sallee grew up in La Plata, Maryland. He graduated from Maurice J. McDonough High School in 2012 and attended Berklee College of Music.

== Career ==
=== Pentatonix ===
In 2017, Pentatonix singer Avi Kaplan announced his departure. Soon after, it was reported that he would be replaced by Matt Sallee. Sallee made his first appearance during the group's last Christmas concert of 2017. Sallee’s first album was A Pentatonix Christmas Deluxe. He sings bass, baritone solos (sometimes going up to tenor register) and he occasionally does beatboxing, For example, in "Joyful, Joyful", in Kevin Olusola's rap verse, he handles beatboxing duties. He also does the bassline and vocal percussion at the same time on their cover of "Havana".

== Personal life ==
Sallee became engaged to his girlfriend Sarah Bishop in 2020 and the two married on January 2, 2022. The couple's baby was born in July of 2024. He is close friends with fellow Pentatonix member Kevin Olusola.
