= List of Billboard Best Bets for Christmas 1963–1973 =

Best Selling Albums and Singles on Billboard's exclusive Christmas chart

American music chart publisher Billboard magazine began publishing annual Christmas singles and albums charts, the Billboard Best Bets for Christmas, (Note: Known has Christmas Records from 1963 to 1964 and Top Christmas Sellers in 1965.) in surveys from 1963 to 1973 for a total of 46 weeks. Each survey included a top-selling Christmas LP's and a Christmas Singles chart that ran for 3–5 weeks each holiday season expanding in size as sales activity increased. Before then, Christmas-themed hits were only included on the Hot 100 or on their other weekly charts. Billboard charted Christmas albums and singles exclusively in this section until 1972.

== Billboard number one Best Bets For Christmas ==
These are Billboard's Best Bets for Christmas number-one albums and singles:

Issue date	Albums	Artist	Singles	Artist	Ref.
November 30, 1963	The Andy Williams Christmas Album	Andy Williams	"White Christmas"	Andy Williams	
December 7, 1963	The Andy Williams Christmas Album	Andy Williams	"White Christmas"	Andy Williams	
December 14, 1963	The Andy Williams Christmas Album	Andy Williams	"White Christmas"	Andy Williams	
December 21, 1963	The Andy Williams Christmas Album	Andy Williams	"White Christmas"	Andy Williams	
December 28, 1963	The Andy Williams Christmas Album	Andy Williams	"White Christmas"	Andy Williams	
December 5, 1964	The Little Drummer Boy	Harry Simeone Chorale	"Blue Christmas"	Elvis Presley	
December 12, 1964	The Andy Williams Christmas Album	Andy Williams	"The Little Drummer Boy"	Harry Simeone Chorale	
December 19, 1964	The Andy Williams Christmas Album	Andy Williams	"The Little Drummer Boy"	Harry Simeone Chorale	
December 26, 1964	The Andy Williams Christmas Album	Andy Williams	"The Little Drummer Boy"	Harry Simeone Chorale	
December 11, 1965	The Andy Williams Christmas Album	Andy Williams	"The Little Drummer Boy"	Harry Simeone Chorale	
December 18, 1965	The Little Drummer Boy	Harry Simeone Chorale	"The Little Drummer Boy"	Harry Simeone Chorale	
December 25, 1965	The Little Drummer Boy	Harry Simeone Chorale	"The Little Drummer Boy"	Harry Simeone Chorale	
December 3, 1966	The Dean Martin Christmas Album	Dean Martin	"The Little Drummer Boy"	Harry Simeone Chorale	
December 10, 1966	Merry Christmas	Andy Williams	"The Little Drummer Boy"	Harry Simeone Chorale	
December 17, 1966	The Little Drummer Boy	Harry Simeone Chorale	"The Little Drummer Boy"	Harry Simeone Chorale	
December 24, 1966	Merry Christmas	Andy Williams	"Sleep in Heavenly Sleep (Silent Night)"	Barbra Streisand	
December 2, 1967	A Christmas Album	Barbra Streisand	"Snoopy's Christmas"	The Royal Guardsmen	
December 9, 1967	A Christmas Album	Barbra Streisand	"Snoopy's Christmas"	The Royal Guardsmen	
December 16, 1967	A Christmas Album	Barbra Streisand	"Snoopy's Christmas"	The Royal Guardsmen	
December 23, 1967	A Christmas Album	Barbra Streisand	"Snoopy's Christmas"	The Royal Guardsmen	
December 30, 1967	A Christmas Album	Barbra Streisand	"Snoopy's Christmas"	The Royal Guardsmen	
December 7, 1968	Christmas Album	Herb Alpert & The Tijuana Brass	"The Christmas Song"	Herb Alpert & The Tijuana Brass	
December 14, 1968	Christmas Album	Herb Alpert & The Tijuana Brass	"The Christmas Song"	Herb Alpert & The Tijuana Brass	
December 21, 1968	That Christmas Feeling	Glen Campbell	"The Christmas Song"	Herb Alpert & The Tijuana Brass	
December 28, 1968	That Christmas Feeling	Glen Campbell	"The Little Drummer Boy"	Harry Simeone Chorale	
December 6, 1969	Give Me Your Love for Christmas	Johnny Mathis	"White Christmas"	Bing Crosby	
December 13, 1969	The Christmas Song	Nat King Cole	"The Christmas Song"	Nat King Cole	
December 20, 1969	Merry Christmas	Andy Williams	"Jingle Bell Rock"	Bobby Helms	
December 27, 1969	Jim Nabors' Christmas Album	Jim Nabors	"Jingle Bell Rock"	Bobby Helms	
December 19, 1970	Jackson 5 Christmas Album	Jackson 5	"Santa Claus Is Coming to Town"	Jackson 5	
December 26, 1970	Jackson 5 Christmas Album	Jackson 5	"Merry Christmas, Darling"	Carpenters	
December 18, 1971	A Partridge Family Christmas Card	The Partridge Family	"Santa Claus Is Coming to Town" / "Christmas Won't Be the Same This Year"	Jackson 5	
December 25, 1971	A Partridge Family Christmas Card	The Partridge Family	"Merry Christmas, Darling"	Carpenters	
December 9, 1972	Elvis Sings The Wonderful World of Christmas	Elvis Presley	"Jingle Bells"	The Singing Dogs	
December 16, 1972	The Christmas Song	Nat King Cole	"Please Come Home for Christmas"	Charles Brown	
December 23, 1972	Jackson 5 Christmas Album	Jackson 5	"The Christmas Song"	Nat King Cole	
December 8, 1973	Elvis Sings The Wonderful World of Christmas	Elvis Presley	"Merry Christmas, Darling"	Carpenters	
December 15, 1973	A Motown Christmas	Various artists	"Step into Christmas"	Elton John	
December 22, 1973	A Christmas Album	Barbra Streisand	"Blue Christmas"	Elvis Presley	

== Top 10 Christmas Albums ==
These are the LPs that reached the top 10 on Billboard's Christmas Record charts from 1958 until 1973. Record collectors and holiday music fans believe that every contemporary holiday album owes a debt to one or more of the albums below.

Rank	Album	Artist	Year Rlsd.	Peak Date	Peak Pos.	Weeks		
Rank	Album	Artist	Year Rlsd.	Peak Date	Peak Pos.	Peak	Top 10	Chart
1	The Andy Williams Christmas Album	Andy Williams	1963	11/30/1963	No. 1	9	23	30
2	A Christmas Album	Barbra Streisand	1967	12/2/1967	No. 1	6	16	20
3	The Little Drummer Boy	Harry Simeone Chorale	1959	12/5/1964	No. 1	4	25	35
4	Merry Christmas	Andy Williams	1966	12/10/1966	No. 1	3	12	20
5	Jackson 5 Christmas Album	Jackson 5	1970	12/26/1970	No. 1	3	10	10
6	The Christmas Song	Nat King Cole	1963	12/13/1969	No. 1	2	29	35
7	Elvis Sings The Wonderful World of Christmas	Elvis Presley	1971	12/9/1972	No. 1	2	8	8
8	Herb Alpert & The Tijuana Brass Christmas Album	Herb Alpert	1968	12/7/1968	No. 1	2	6	10
9	That Christmas Feeling	Glen Campbell	1968	12/21/1968	No. 1	2	6	10
10	A Partridge Family Christmas Card	The Partridge Family	1971	12/18/1971	No. 1	2	3	5
11	The Dean Martin Christmas Album	Dean Martin	1966	12/3/1966	No. 1	1	14	19
12	Jim Nabors' Christmas Album	Jim Nabors	1967	12/27/1969	No. 1	1	13	21
13	Give Me Your Love For Christmas	Johnny Mathis	1969	12/6/1969	No. 1	1	10	12
14	A Motown Christmas	Various Artists	1973	2/15/1973	No. 1	1	3	3
15	Music of Christmas	Percy Faith And His Orchestra	1957	11/24/1958	No. 1	1	1	2
16	Elvis' Christmas Album	Elvis Presley	1957	12/11/1965	No. 2	7	23	31
17	Merry Christmas	Johnny Mathis	1958	11/30/1963	No. 2	6	27	29
18	Merry Christmas	Bing Crosby	1955	12/26/1964	No. 2	3	34	40
19	Sounds of Christmas	Johnny Mathis	1963	12/21/1963	No. 2	2	7	20
20	Merry Christmas Ho! Ho! Ho!	Lou Rawls	1967	12/9/1967	No. 2	1	5	10
21	Christmas with Mahalia	Mahalia Jackson	1968	12/13/1969	No. 2	1	2	5
22	Christmas Album	Bobby Sherman	1970	12/19/1970	No. 2	1	2	3
23	A Jolly Christmas From Frank Sinatra	Frank Sinatra	1957	11/24/1958	No. 2	1	1	11
24	John Gary Christmas Album	John Gary	1964	12/5/1964	No. 3	1	4	17
25	Handel: Messiah	The Philadelphia Orchestra / The Mormon Tabernacle Choir / Eugene Ormandy	1959	12/13/1969	No. 3	1	2	6
26	The Sinatra Family Wish You a Merry Christmas	Frank Sinatra featuring Frank Sinatra Jr., Nancy Sinatra and Tina Sinatra	1969	12/13/1969	No. 3	1	2	4
27	This Christmas I Spend With You	Robert Goulet	1963	12/21/1963	No. 4	2	6	13
28	Sound of Christmas	Ramsey Lewis Trio	1961	12/18/1965	No. 4	1	8	24
29	The Temptations Christmas Card	The Temptations	1970	12/23/1972	No. 4	1	5	5
30	Merle Haggard's Christmas Present	Merle Haggard	1973	12/8/1973	No. 4	1	2	3
31	Merry Christmas	Jackie Gleason	1956	11/24/1958	No. 4	1	1	7
32	We Wish You A Merry Christmas	Ray Conniff	1962	12/9/1972	No. 5	1	3	20
33	Season's Greetings from Perry Como	Perry Como	1959	12/7/1963	No. 5	1	2	20
34	O' Bambino — The Little Drummer Boy	Harry Simeone Chorale	1965	2/3/1966	No. 5	1	2	5
35	Merry Christmas!	New Christy Minstrels	1963	12/28/1963	No. 5	1	1	8
36	Christmas Carols	Mantovani	1954	11/24/1958	No. 5	1	1	1
37	Noël	Joan Baez	1966	12/3/1966	No. 6	4	5	13
38	Merry Christmas	The Supremes	1965	12/11/1965	No. 6	2	3	12
39	Snoopy And His Friends	The Royal Guardsmen	1967	12/23/1967	No. 6	2	2	7
40	The Beach Boys' Christmas Album	The Beach Boys	1965	12/18/1965	No. 6	1	3	13
41	A Christmas Gift for You from Phil Spector	Various Artists	1963	12/23/1972	No. 6	1	3	6
42	Songs of Christmas	The Norman Luboff Choir	1956	11/24/1958	No. 6	1	1	1
43	Merry Christmas from the Brady Bunch	The Brady Bunch	1970	12/25/1971	No. 6	1	1	1
44	Christmas Greetings From Mantovani And His Orchestra	Mantovani	1963	12/21/1963	No. 7	1	3	14
45	Merry Christmas from Brenda Lee	Brenda Lee	1964	12/16/1972	No. 7	1	1	15
46	Christmas with Conniff	Ray Conniff	1959	12/27/1969	No. 7	1	1	11
47	The Christmas Spirit	Johnny Cash	1963	12/13/1969	No. 7	1	1	5
48	Now Is The Caroling Season	Fred Waring and his Pennsylvanians	1957	11/24/1958	No. 7	1	1	1
49	Handel's Messiah	Robert Shaw Chorale and Orchestra	1966	12/7/1968	No. 8	2	2	5
50	Christmas in My Home Town	Charley Pride	1970	12/23/1972	No. 8	1	3	6
51	More Sounds of Christmas	Ramsey Lewis Trio	1964	12/26/1964	No. 8	1	2	15
52	Merry Christmas	Al Martino	1964	12/19/1964	No. 8	1	2	11
53	Christmas with The King Family	The King Family	1965	12/18/1965	No. 8	1	2	2
54	The Joy of Christmas	The Mormon Tabernacle Choir / The New York Philharmonic / Leonard Bernstein	1963	12/11/1965	No. 8	1	2	11
55	Soul Christmas (Atco Records 33-269)	Various artists	1968	12/6/1969	No. 8	1	2	6
56	Beloved Choruses	The Philadelphia Orchestra / The Mormon Tabernacle Choir / Eugene Ormandy	1958	12/18/1965	No. 8	1	2	4
57	Christmas '64	Jimmy Smith	1964	12/5/1964	No. 8	1	2	4
58	The Voices of Christmas	The Voices of Walter Schumann	1955	11/24/1958	No. 8	1	2	1
59	Ventures' Christmas Album	The Ventures	1965	12/18/1965	No. 9	2	2	9
60	Christmas Hymns & Carols	Robert Shaw Chorale	1957	11/24/1958	No. 9	2	2	8
61	12 Songs Of Christmas	Frank Sinatra, Bing Crosby and Fred Waring	1964	12/19/1964	No. 9	2	2	3
62	Merry Xmas From José Feliciano	José Feliciano	1970	12/8/1973	No. 9	2	2	3
63	Navidad Means Christmas	Eydie Gorme & Trio Los Panchos	1966	12/17/1966	No. 9	1	2	4
64	Holiday Sing Along with Mitch	Mitch Miller and The Gang	1961	12/28/1963	No. 9	1	1	17
65	Christmas with The Chipmunks Volume 2	David Seville & The Chipmunks	1963	12/21/1963	No. 9	1	1	13
66	A Christmas Treasure	Julie Andrews with Andre Previn	1967	12/2/1967	No. 9	1	1	6
67	A Christmas Festival	Arthur Fiedler & Boston Pops Orchestra	1970	12/19/1970	No. 9	1	1	2
68	Joy to The World	Roger Wagner Chorale	1956	11/24/1958	No. 9	1	1	1
69	Songs For A Merry Christmas	Wayne Newton	1966	12/3/1966	No. 10	3	3	10
70	Christmas Wonderland	Bert Kaempfert	1963	12/7/1963	No. 10	2	2	13
71	Christmas Present...And Past	Paul Revere & the Raiders	1967	12/9/1967	No. 10	1	1	5
72	Snowfall: The Tony Bennett Christmas Album	Tony Bennett	1968	12/14/1968	No. 10	1	1	3
73	A Soulful Christmas	James Brown	1968	12/13/1969	No. 10	1	1	3
74	The Perry Como Christmas Album	Perry Como	1968	12/26/1970	No. 10	1	1	3
75	The Christmas Album: 20 Great Christmas Favorites By 20 Great Artist (Columbia Records 30763)	Various artists	1972	12/8/1973	No. 10	1	1	3

== See also ==
- Billboard Christmas Hits 1983-1989
- Billboard Christmas Holiday Charts
