= Billboard Christmas Holiday charts =

Music rankings by the trade magazine Billboard of Christmas Holiday Music

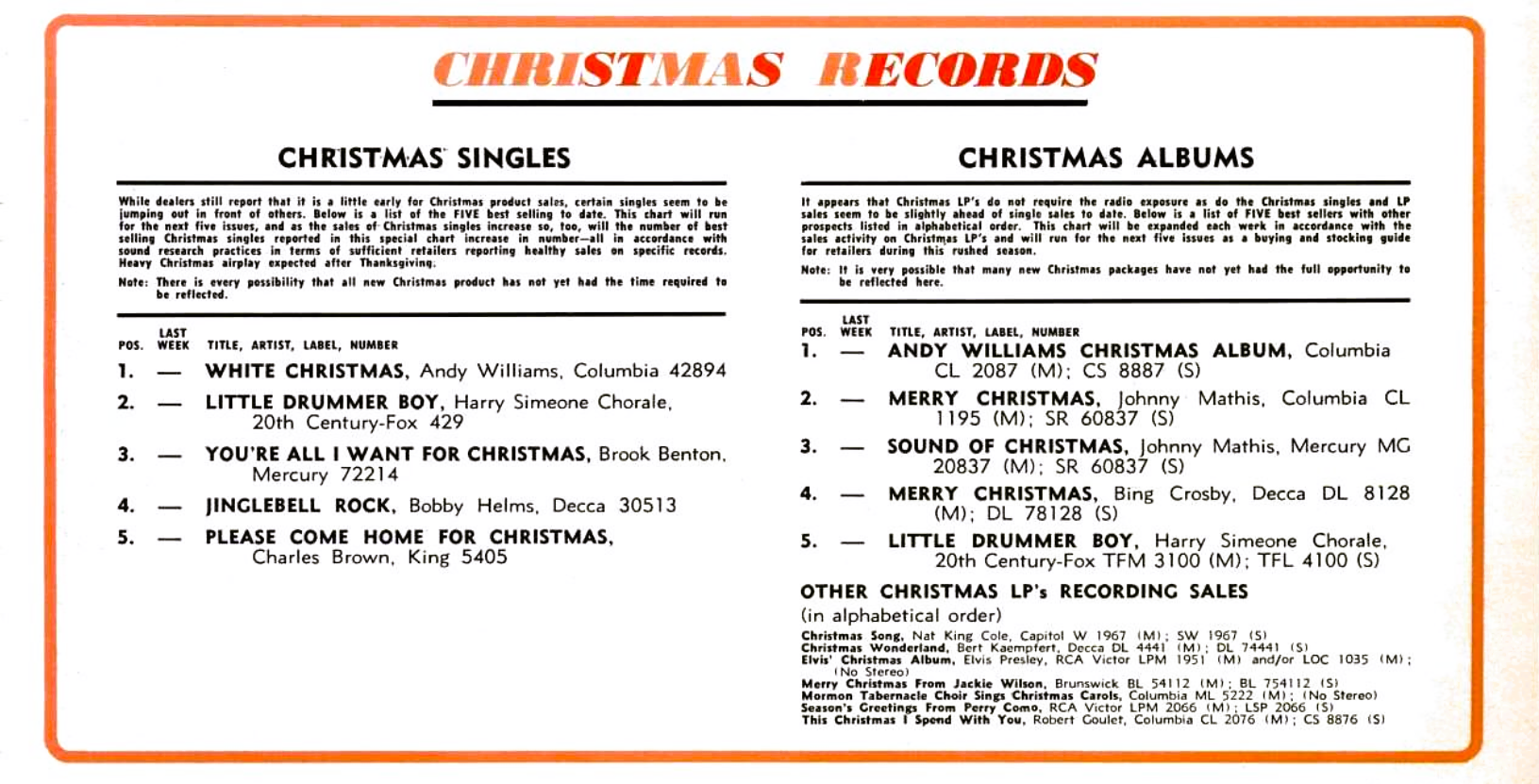
Billboard magazine's first annual "Christmas Records" charts from November 30, 1963.

Billboard magazine only charted Christmas singles and albums along with the other popular non-holiday records until the 1958 holiday season when they published their first section that surveys only Christmas music.

An increase of Christmas records began charting Billboard in 1957. The popular music surveys charted 9 Christmas singles, including the debut of the Bobby Helms' standard "Jingle Bell Rock" (Top 100 Sides #6). Gene Autry's newly recorded version of his 1949 original "Rudolph the Red-Nosed Reindeer" made the Top 100 Sides at No. 70. The Best Selling Pop LP's had 11 seasonal albums chart including the debut of Elvis' Christmas Album that topped the survey for 3 weeks.

Bing Crosby's all-time best-selling single "White Christmas" returned to the Top 40 again in 1957 at No. 34. It has charted Billboard's surveys almost annually since it first spent 11 consecutive weeks at No. 1 on their Best Selling Retail Records chart beginning Oct. 31, 1942 It reached the top spot again in 1945 for two more weeks and made its 14th No. 1 week on December 28, 1946. Crosby's "Silent Night" (Top 100 Sides #54) and "Silver Bells" (Top 100 Sides #78) also made the Top 100 Sides in 1957. All 3 of these titles are included on his Merry Christmas which returned to No. 1 in January 1958 after charting Billboard's album surveys since its debut in 1945.

== Top 10 charting Christmas singles 1940-1957 ==
The "Billboard Music Popularity Chart" began weekly publication in their July 27, 1940 issue, with lists covering jukebox play, radio play, record sales and sheet music sales. The following are the most popular Christmas holiday singles that charted prior to 1958 according to those surveys.

Rank	Single	Artist	Peak Date	Peak	Weeks Charted	
Rank	Single	Artist	Peak Date	Peak	at Peak	Total
1	"White Christmas"	Bing Crosby with Ken Darby Singers and John Scott Trotter Orch.	10/31/1942	1	14	64
2	"Let It Snow! Let It Snow! Let It Snow!"	Vaughn Monroe and his orchestra	1/19/1946	1	5	14
3	"All I Want For Christmas (Is My Two Front Teeth)"	Spike Jones and his City Slickers	12/25/1948	1	3	9
4	"I Saw Mommy Kissing Santa Claus"	Jimmy Boyd accompanied by The Norman Luboff Choir	12/27/1952	1	2	5
5	"I've Got My Love to Keep Me Warm"	Les Brown and his orchestra	3/5/1949	1	1	17
6	"Rudolph, The Red-Nosed Reindeer"	Gene Autry and The Pinafores	12/31/1949	1	1	17
7	"I'll Be Home For Christmas (If Only In My Dreams)"	Bing Crosby with John Scott Trotter and his orchestra	12/25/1943	3	2	6
8	"Baby, It's Cold Outside"	Margaret Whiting & Johnny Mercer with Paul Weston Orch.	7/9/1949	3	1	19
9	"Baby, It's Cold Outside"	Dinah Shore & Buddy Clark with Ted Dale and his orchestra	7/30/1949	3	1	19
10	"The Christmas Song (Merry Christmas To You)"	The King Cole Trio with string choir	12/28/1946	3	1	8
11	"Santa Baby"	Eartha Kitt and Henri René and his orchestra	12/26/1953	4	1	5
12	"I Saw Mommy Kissing Santa Claus"	Spike Jones and his City Slickers	12/27/1952	4	1	3
13	"Winter Wonderland"	Johnny Mercer and The Pied Pipers with Paul Weston and orch.	1/4/1947	4	1	1
14	"I Yust Go Nuts At Christmas" / "Yingle Bells"	Yogi Yorgesson with The Johnny Duffy Trio	12/31/1949	5	2	5
15	"White Christmas"	Frank Sinatra with the Ken Lane Singers	12/29/1945	5	1	9
16	"Jingle Bells"	Glenn Miller and orch. with Tex Beneke, Ernie Caceres & Modernaires	12/27/1941	5	1	2
17	"Jingle Bell Rock"	Bobby Helms with instrumental accompaniment	12/30/1957	6	1	6
18	"Nuttin' For Christmas"	Barry Gordon with Art Mooney and his orchestra	12/31/1955	6	1	4
19	"Frosty the Snowman"	Gene Autry & the Cass County Boys	12/30/1950	7	1	6
20	"Rudolph The Red-Nosed Reindeer"	Spike Jones and his City Slickers	12/30/1950	7	1	6
21	"Let It Snow! Let It Snow! Let It Snow!"	Woody Herman and his orchestra	2/16/1946	7	1	4
22	"Christmas Island"	Andrews Sisters and Guy Lombardo & his Royal Canadians	12/28/1946	7	1	4
23	"Here Comes Santa Claus (Down Santa Claus Lane)"	Gene Autry with vocal group	12/25/1948	8	1	8
24	"(There's No Place Like) Home for the Holidays"	Perry Como with Mitch Ayres and his orchestra	12/25/1954	8	1	3
25	"Baby, It's Cold Outside"	Ella Fitzgerald & Louis Jordan and his Tympany Five	7/23/1949	9	4	13
26	"I've Got My Love To Keep Me Warm"	The Mills Brothers with rhythm accompaniment	4/2/1949	9	1	11
27	"Blue Christmas"	Hugo Winterhalter and his orchestra	12/31/1949	9	1	5
28	"The Night Before Christmas Song"	Rosemary Clooney & Gene Autry with Carl Cotner's Orch.	12/27/1952	9	1	2
29	"Let It Snow! Let It Snow! Let It Snow!"	Connee Boswell and Russ Morgan & his orchestra	2/2/1946	9	1	1
30	"Frosty The Snow Man"	Nat King Cole & The Singing Pussy Cats with Pete Rugolo Orch.	12/30/1950	9	1	1
31	"Jingle Bells"	Les Paul	12/29/1951	10	1	4
32	"Christmas in Killarney"	Dennis Day with The Mellowmen and Henri René and his orch.	12/30/1950	10	1	3
33	"Winter Wonderland"	Perry Como and The Satisfiers with Russ Case and his orchestra	12/28/1946	10	1	1

== Deejay's Favorite Christmas Disks ==
On November 24, 1958, the magazine published Deejay's Favorite Christmas Disks. Described as the records played most frequently by disk jockeys each Christmas season, according to a survey made by The Billboard, the section consisted of 3 top 10 lists charting the top Holiday Singles, LP Albums and for the only time on Billboard's Christmas/Holiday surveys, EP Albums. Bing Crosby's "White Christmas" was the No. 1 single, Percy Faith's 1954 Music of Christmas was the No. 1 LP and Pat Boone's 1957 Merry Christmas was the No. 1 EP. A Holiday survey would not be published again until the annual Christmas Records section is launched in 1963.

Seven holiday singles charted the first year of Billboard's Hot 100 in 1958 including the debut of "The Chipmunk Song (Christmas Don't Be Late)" (Hot 100 #1 for 4 weeks) and Harry Simeone's "Little Drummer Boy" (Hot 100 #13). Bobby Helms' "Jingle Bell Rock" returned to the charts at No. 35. Eight holiday albums charted on Billboard's Best-Selling LP's survey in 1958 including the debut of Johnny Mathis' Merry Christmas that peaked at No. 3 on December 27. Mitch Miller & The Gang's first holiday album Christmas Sing Along with Mitch peaked at No. 1 on January 8, 1959. Bing Crosby's "White Christmas" made its first Hot 100 appearance in 1959 at No. 59. Perry Como debuted his second Christmas album Season's Greetings from Perry Como on The Billboard's TOP LP'S on January 8, 1960, peaking at No. 22.

The 1960 Hot 100 had 10 holiday singles including the debut of an annual charting of Brenda Lee's standard "Rockin' Around the Christmas Tree" (Hot 100 #14) and the return of Nat King Cole's "The Christmas Song (Merry Christmas To You)" (Deejay's Favorite Christmas Disks #2, Hot 100 #80). Bing Crosby's "Silent Night" (Deejay's Favorite Christmas Disks #8, Hot 100 #54) also returned in 1960 and the flip side "Adeste Fidelis" (Hot 100 #45) also from his 1945 Merry Christmas album made its first charting.

Bobby Helms returned to the Hot 100 at No. 36 in 1960 with the start of an annual charting of "Jingle Bell Rock". Harry Simeone's "Little Drummer Boy" and "The Chipmunk Song" re-charted the Hot 100 every year after their initial release just as Christmas Sing Along with Mitch and Johnny Mathis' Merry Christmas album had on Billboard's Best-Selling LPs chart. The Chipmunks with David Seville followed up in 1960 with a cover of "Rudolph The Red Nosed Reindeer" that peaked at No. 21 on the Hot 100. Bobby Rydell & Chubby Checker's cover of "Jingle Bell Rock" peaked at No. 21 and "Baby's First Christmas" by Connie Francis peaked at No. 26 in 1961, both re-charting the following year. Bing Crosby's "White Christmas" returned to the Hot 100 in 1961 at No. 12 and in 1962 at No. 38.

Billboard's TOP LP's charted 21 holiday albums in 1962. Mitch Miller's Gang peaked at No. 1 again with their latest Christmas album Holiday Sing Along with Mitch. Bing Crosby returned with Merry Christmas (Deejay's Favorite Christmas Disks #3, Top Mono LP's #46) and debuted his latest I Wish You a Merry Christmas (Top Mono LP's #50). The 1962 Hot 100 had 12 seasonal singles including new releases like The 4 Seasons cover of "Santa Claus Is Comin' to Town" (Hot 100 #23) and re-charting holiday standards like Nat King Cole's "The Christmas Song" (Hot 100 #65). Billboard debuted their first annual Christmas Records charts the following year.

== Best Bets for Christmas ==
Beginning with the issue dated November 30, 1963, Billboard magazine no longer charted Christmas albums or singles on its existing music charts. For the next 10 years, these titles could only be found in their new annual best-selling Christmas Records section (retitled Billboard Top Christmas Sellers in 1965 and then Billboard Best Bets for Christmas in 1966 through 1973). (Note: "Pretty Paper" by Roy Orbison had already began charting on the Hot 100 in 1963 and did not appear on Billboard's Christmas Singles Chart until the following year. It did peak at No. 1 for 4 weeks on 1963's Cashbox magazine's short-lived Christmas Record Activity singles chart.) The 5-position survey ranking of top-selling Christmas Singles (Note: The top-selling Christmas Singles was titled Best Selling Christmas Singles in 1966) and Christmas LP's (Note: The top-selling Christmas LP's was titled Christmas Albums in 1963 and Best Selling Christmas LP's in 1966) ran for 3–5 weeks each holiday season expanding in size as sales activity increased.

The Andy Williams Christmas Album was the first number one album and his version of "White Christmas" from the same album was the first number one single, both peaking at No. 1 for the 5 week entirety of the section run in 1963. The chart size increased each holiday season until peaking at 38 singles and 117 LPS in 1967. Beginning in 1971, the Best Bets for Christmas only ran 2–3 weeks a year and listed significantly less titles with the singles chart only having 3 positions on December 18 of that year.

Bing Crosby's Merry Christmas (LPs #2) spent 39 weeks on the LP survey from 1963 to 1973, more than any other album at the time. Harry Simeone's album The Little Drummer Boy (LPs #1) and Nat King Cole's album The Christmas Song (LPs #1) tie at second, both charting 35 weeks between 1963 and 1973. Crosby's Merry Christmas, Cole's The Christmas Song and Johnny Mathis' Merry Christmas (LPs #2) spent more than 25 weeks each in the top 10. The Andy Williams Christmas Album spent the most time on top of the chart at 9 inconsecutive weeks between 1963 and 1965. Andy Williams follow up, Merry Christmas spent 3 inconsecutive weeks at number one from 1966 to 1969. Barbra Streisand's 1967 A Christmas Album topped the second most with 6 weeks and Harry Simeone's The Little Drummer Boy album comes in 3rd with 4 weeks at number one on the Best Bets For Christmas album chart.

Harry Simeone's "The Little Drummer Boy" single peaked at No. 1 for 10 weeks between 1964 and 1968, the most of any title on Billboard's Christmas 45 rpm record surveys. His hit and 1960's "Please Come Home For Christmas" by Charles Brown (45's #1) spent more time than any other single in the top 10 of the Best Bets for Christmas survey at 33 weeks each. Both, along with Bing Crosby's "White Christmas" (45's #1), Bobby Helms' "Jingle Bell Rock" (45's #1) and Elvis Presley's "Blue Christmas" (45's #1) spent more than 30 weeks each on the Christmas singles survey between 1963 and 1973. Andy William's "White Christmas" and 1967's "Snoopy's Christmas" by The Royal Guardsmen topped the chart 5 times each tying both for the second most weeks at No. 1 on Billboard's Christmas Singles chart.

The Carpenters "Merry Christmas, Darling" was No. 1 on the singles chart the most during the 1970s with 3 weeks. Second is the Jackson 5's "Santa Claus Is Comin' to Town' which topped the survey twice that decade. Both debuted on the Best Bets For Christmas in 1970. The Jackson 5 Christmas Album topped the album chart the most in the 70's with 3 weeks. 1971's A Partridge Family Christmas Card and Elvis Sings The Wonderful World of Christmas tie for second with each peaking at No. 1 for 2 weeks.

Titles on these Christmas surveys did not appear on Billboard's other charts until 1973 when "Please Daddy" by John Denver (Hot 100 #69, Hot Country Singles #69) and "If We Make It Through December" by Merle Haggard (Hot 100 #28, Hot Country Singles #1) both peaked at No. 7 on the Best Selling Christmas Singles chart as well as appearing on the Hot 100 and Hot Country Singles chart. (Note: The only exceptions were The Harry Simeone Chorale's 1964 "O'Bambino" and the 1966 single "There Won't Be Any Snow" by Derrik Roberts. Both charted for 1 week on the Bubbling Under the Hot 100 survey at No. 105 the same week that each debuted on the Christmas singles chart. On a few occasions, Christmas singles would chart Billboard's weekly charts instead of the Christmas singles chart. In 1970, James Brown's "Santa Claus Is Definitely Here To Stay" charted Best Bets For Christmas peaking at No. 7 while "Hey America" from the same holiday album Bubbled Under the Hot 100 at No. 105.) Holiday albums only charted the Best Bets for Christmas that year. Christmas music surveys were not published after the December 22, 1973 Best Bets For Christmas until the section continues in 1983 retitled Christmas Hits.

Billboard sporadically provided a section entitled New Christmas Selections from 1974 until 1976 that alphabetically listed titles of holiday record albums and singles. Many singles and albums have re-charted over the years, but hundreds of titles only appeared in these best-seller sections that are unavailable on Billboard's website. The charts are extensively researched in Joel Whitburn's Christmas in the Charts 1920-2004 that contain statistics on every Christmas single and album that charted all of Billboard's music surveys. From 1974 until 1982, the magazine reverted to charting seasonal hits only on their weekly popular music surveys such as the Eagles' 1978 cover of "Please Come Home For Christmas" (Hot 100 #18) and Dan Fogelberg's 1980 "Same Old Lang Syne" (Hot 100 #9, Adult Contemporary #8) as well as LPs and tapes like John Denver's 1975 Rocky Mountain Christmas (Top LPs & Tapes #14) and Kenny Rogers' 1981 Christmas (Top LPs & Tapes #34, Top Country LPs #10).

== Christmas Hits ==
After 9 years, Billboard began publishing the best-selling Christmas Album and Single chart survey section again under the title Christmas Hits on December 17, 1983. The top 10 charts ran for two weeks each holiday season for the next 3 years then returned in 1987 as a 30 position album only chart. Unlike the Best Bets For Christmas, Christmas Hits would often also chart Billboard's other music surveys such as Kenny Rogers & Dolly Parton's 1984 Once Upon A Christmas (Top 200 Albums #31, Top Country Albums #12) and 1985's Alabama Christmas (Top 200 Albums #75, Top Country Albums #8) which both peaked at No. 1 on the Christmas Hits album survey.

Kenny Roger's 1981 Christmas was number one on the album chart for the first two weeks of the Christmas Hits survey. A Very Special Christmas spent the most weeks at the top of the album chart during the 1980s with 3 consecutive weeks starting December 12, 1987. Mannheim Steamroller's A Fresh Aire Christmas spent 2 consecutive weeks at No. 1 starting December 24, 1988 and went on to top the chart 4 more weeks during the 1990s.

Barbra Streisand's A Christmas Album (Christmas Hits #2) and 1978's Christmas Portrait by The Carpenters (Christmas Hits #2) charted all 13 weeks of the Christmas Hits album chart. Kenny Rogers and Dolly Parton's Once Upon a Christmas, Nat King Cole's The Christmas Song (Christmas Hits #5) and 1984's Mannheim Steamroller Christmas (Christmas Hits #2) tie for second most times on the chart during the eighties with 11 weeks each. Bing Crosby's Merry Christmas, Nat King Cole's The Christmas Song and Elvis's Christmas Album spent more than 40 weeks each on the Best Bets for Christmas and Christmas Hits surveys, more weeks than other LP during the entire holiday album chart run at the time.

Bing Crosby's "White Christmas" returned to the top of the singles chart for the first week of the Christmas Hits survey. His hit has charted the most with 37 total weeks during the entire Christmas singles survey run. Bobby Helms comes in second with "Jingle Bell Rock" charting a total of 36 weeks. Harry Simeone's "Little Drummer Boy", Charles Brown's "Please Come Home For Christmas", Nat King Cole's "The Christmas Song" and Elvis Presley's "Blue Christmas " also charted over 30 weeks each during the entirety of the Christmas singles survey. All 6 of these records peaked at No. 1 over the duration of Billboard's Christmas singles charts.

Elmo 'N Patsy's "Grandma Got Run Over by a Reindeer" spent the most weeks at top of the Christmas Hits singles chart during the 1980s with 4 consecutive weeks starting December 24, 1983. It was also the only single that crossed over charting the Hot Country Singles chart at No. 92 in 1984. Band Aid's "Do They Know It's Christmas?" (Hot 100 #13) reached number 6 on Billboard's Hot Singles Sales chart in 1984 and had sold an estimated 2.5 million copies in the U.S. by January 1985, but did not appear on Billboard's Christmas Hits best selling singles survey. (Note: "Do They Know It's Christmas" has charted every year of the Holiday Songs chart peaking at No. 6 in 2003.)

Bruce Springsteen's cover of "Santa Claus is Comin' To Town" had peaked at No. 1 when Billboard published their last Christmas Hits single survey on December 28, 1985. An alphabetical listing of Christmas singles would be featured in the magazine's "Reviews and Previews" section, but a seasonal album chart would be the only Christmas survey published until the introduction of Holiday Songs in 2001. For the next 25 years, best-sellers like 1989's "This One's For The Children" by New Kids On The Block (Hot 100 #7, Adult Contemporary #7, Hot Black Singles #55) and 1993's "Let It Snow" by Boyz II Men Featuring Brian McKnight (Hot 100 #32, Hot R&B Singles #17) were only surveyed on their weekly popular music charts until Billboard began surveying best selling Christmas songs in 2010 on the Holiday Digital Song Sales chart and also on the Holiday 100 beginning the following year.

== Top charting Christmas singles 1958-1985 ==
The Deejay's Favorite Christmas Disks, Christmas Records, Top Christmas Sellers. Best Bets For Christmas and Christmas Hits single surveys ran 46 weeks and charted 134 titles from 1958 until 1985. These are Billboard's top ranking Christmas 45 rpm record singles.

Rank	Single	Artist	Year Rlsd.	Peak Date	Peak Pos.	Weeks Charted		
Rank	Single	Artist	Year Rlsd.	Peak Date	Peak Pos.	Peak	Top 10	Total
1	"The Little Drummer Boy"	Harry Simeone Chorale	1958 (Note: All chartings of Harry Simeone's "The Little Drummer Boy" since 1972 have been the 1965 remake from the album O Bambino - The Little Drummer Boy.)	12/12/1964	1	10	34	35
2	"White Christmas"	Andy Williams	1963	11/30/1963	1	5	5	7
3	"Snoopy's Christmas"	The Royal Guardsmen	1967	12/2/1967	1	5	5	7
4	"Grandma Got Run Over by a Reindeer"	Elmo & Patsy	1979 (Note: Beginning 1984, the 1982 re-recording of "Grandma Got Run Over by a Reindeer" issued on Epic Records charted instead of the original 1979 recording issued on Soundwaves Records.)	12/24/1983	1	4	6	6
5	"White Christmas"	Bing Crosby w/Ken Darby Singers & John Scott Trotter Orch.	1947	11/24/1958	1	3	36	37
6	"Merry Christmas, Darling"	Carpenters	1970	12/26/1970	1	3	10	12
7	"The Christmas Song" / "My Favorite Things" (Note: Herb Alpert's "My Favorite Things" charted the Hot 100 peaking at No. 45 in 1969, but did not chart the Best Sellers For Christmas.)	Herb Alpert & the Tijuana Brass	1968	12/7/1968	1	3	4	4
8	"Jingle Bell Rock"	Bobby Helms	1957 (Note: The serial number for Bobby Helm's original 1957 Decca Records recording of "Jingle Bell Rock" was listed with the title until 1970. Occasionally re-recordings made on 3 different record labels would be listed with the same entry. The other recordings were released in 1965 on Kapp Records, 1967 on Little Darlin' and 1970 on Certron. In 1972 and 1973, only the 1965 Kapp Records remake was listed. The 1957 version made available on MCA Records was listed from 1983-1985.)	12/20/1969	1	2	33	36
9	"The Christmas Song (Merry Christmas to You)"	Nat King Cole with Nelson Riddle Orch.	1956	12/13/1969	1	2	29	34
10	"Blue Christmas" (Note: The 1957 recording of Elvis Presley's "Blue Christmas" received its first commercial single release as the B-side of "Wooden Heart" which Bubbled Under the Hot 100 at No. 107 in 1964.) (Note: Elvis Prelsey's "Blue Christmas" was re-released in 1965 with the flip side "Santa Claus Is Back in Town" which was a U.K. hit single in 1957.)	Elvis Presley	1957	12/5/1964	1	2	25	34
11	"Santa Claus Is Comin' to Town" / "Christmas Won't Be The Same This Year"	The Jackson 5	1970	12/19/1970	1	2	4	5
12	"Please Come Home For Christmas" (Note: Charles Brown's "Please Come Home For Christmas" first charted Billboard's Hot 100 in 1961 peaking at No. 76 in 1962.)	Charles Brown	1960	12/16/1972	1	1	33	35
13	"Jingle Bells"	The Singing Dogs	1955	12/9/1972	1	1	11	11
14	"Sleep in Heavenly Peace (Silent Night)"	Barbra Streisand	1966	12/24/1966	1	1	3	6
15	"Step Into Christmas"	Elton John	1973	12/15/1973	1	1	3	3
16	"Santa Claus Is Comin' to Town"	Bruce Springsteen	1985 (Note: Bruce Springsteen's 1975 live recording of "Santa Claus Is Comin' To Town" was first released on the Sesame Street album In Harmony 2 in 1981 before Springsteen released it as the flip side to his 1985 "My Hometown" single.)	12/28/1985	1	1	2	2
17	"Merry Christmas Baby"	Johnny Moore's Three Blazers (feat. Charles Brown)	1947	12/7/1968	2	3	12	16
18	"The Little Drummer Boy"	Lou Rawls	1967	12/2/1967	2	3	6	7
19	"Santa Looked a Lot Like Daddy"	Buck Owens	1965	12/2/1967	2	3	3	6
20	"Merry Christmas Baby"	Charles Brown	1962 (Note: Charles Brown's 1962 version of "Merry Christmas Baby" on Imperial Records peaked at #4 12/19/64. His 1968 re-recording released on King Records charted for 2 weeks in 1973 peaking at #2, making it his third version to make the survey.)	12/22/1973	2	1	6	7
21	"If Every Day Was Like Christmas"	Elvis Presley	1966	12/10/1966	2	1	4	8
22	"Do You Hear What I Hear?"	Bing Crosby	1963	12/28/1963	2	1	3	4
23	"Who Took The Merry Out Of Christmas"	The Staple Singers	1972	12/8/1973	2	1	2	3
24	"Little Becky's Christmas Wish"	Becky Lamb	1967	12/30/1967	2	1	1	3
25	"Santa Claus and His Old Lady"	Cheech & Chong	1971	12/23/1972	3	3	6	7
26	"The Man with All the Toys"	The Beach Boys	1964	12/5/1964	3	2	3	4
27	"Silver Bells"	Earl Grant	1966	12/13/1969	3	1	13	16
28	"Rockin' Around the Christmas Tree"	Brenda Lee	1958	12/11/1965	3	1	12	24
29	"Happy Xmas (War Is Over)"	John & Yoko and the Plastic Ono Band with The Harlem Community Choir	1971	12/25/1971	3	1	10	10
30	"You're All I Want For Christmas" / "This Time Of The Year" (Note: Brook Benton's "This Time Of The Year" peaked at No. 66 on the Hot 100 in 1959.)	Brook Benton	1963	11/30/1963	3	1	5	6
31	"Christmas in Dixie" (Note: Alabama's "Christmas In Dixie" with the flip side "Christmas Is Just a Song for Us This Year" by Louise Mandrell/R.C. Bannon charted on the Hot Country Singles chart in 1982 peaking at No. 35.)	Alabama	1982	12/17/1983	3	1	4	4
32	"Rudolph, The Red-Nosed Reindeer" / "Silent Night" (Note: The Temptations' "Silent Night" peaked at No. 7 on the Christmas singles chart. The 1980 remake from their album Give Love at Christmas peaked at No. 9 in 1985)	The Temptations	1968	12/18/1971	3	1	3	6
33	"Little Saint Nick"	The Beach Boys	1963	12/28/1963	3	1	1	4
34	"White Christmas"	Perry Como with Lloyd Shaffer and his Orch.	1947	11/24/1958	3	1	1	1
35	"Santa Claus Go Straight To The Ghetto"	James Brown	1968	12/21/1968	4	1	5	6
36	"White Christmas"	The Driftersfeaturing Clyde McPhatter & Bill Pinckney	1954	12/12/1964	4	1	2	9
37	"Back Door Santa"	Clarence Carter	1968	12/14/1968	4	1	2	3
38	"Slipping Into Christmas"	Leon Russell	1972	12/9/1972	4	1	2	2
39	"Christmas Time" (Note: Bryan Adams re-released "Reggae Christmas" as the flip side to "Christmas Time" It was released the previous year on a fan club single and featured on MTV.)	Bryan Adams	1985	12/28/1985	4	1	2	2
40	"There's No Place Like Home For The Holidays" (Note: Perry Como's "Home For The Holidays" first charted Billboard in 1954 peaking at No. 8 on the Most Played By Jockeys Singles chart.)	Perry Como with Mitchell Ayers Orchestra	1954	11/24/1958	4	1	1	1
41	"The Gift Of Giving"	Bill Withers	1972	12/9/1972	5	2	2	2
42	"Silent Night, Holy Night"	Mahalia Jackson	1961	12/9/1967	5	1	4	12
43	"The Mistletoe & Me"	Isaac Hayes	1969	12/22/1973	5	1	3	3
44	"Twinkle Twinkle Little Me" / "Children's Christmas Song" (Note: The Supremes' "Children's Christmas Song" peaked at No. 7 on the Christmas singles chart.)	The Supremes	1965	12/18/1965	5	1	2	7
45	"The Chipmunk Song (Christmas Don't Be Late)" /"Alvin's Harmonica"	David Seville and The Chipmunks	1959 (Note: Re-chartings of the original 1958 #1 Hot 100 recording of "The Chipmunk Song" was reissued by Liberty Records with the 1959 #3 non-holiday hit "Alvin's Harmonica" as the flip side. Both sides re-charted on the Hot 100 during the holiday seasons of 1961 and 1962. "Alvin's Harmonica" did not chart the Christmas Hits chart.)	12/7/1963	5	1	2	5
46	"Christmas Shopping"	Buck Owens and The Buckaroos	1968	12/7/1968	5	1	1	4
47	"The Twelve Gifts of Christmas"	Allan Sherman	1963	12/28/1963	5	1	1	2
48	"Mary's Boy Child" (Note: Harry Belfatonte's "Mary's Boy Child" first charted Billboard in 1956 peaking at No. 12 on the Best Sellers In Stores Singles chart.)	Harry Belafonte	1956	11/24/1958	5	1	1	1
49	"Another Lonely Christmas"	Prince and The Revolution	1984	12/22/1984	5	1	1	1
50	"Lonesome Christmas" (Note: Lowell Fulson first peaked at No. 7 on Billboard's Rhythm and Blues chart in 1950 with "Lonesome Christmas")	Lowell Fulson	1950	12/10/1966	6	1	7	15
51	"That's What I Want For Christmas" / "What Are You Doing New Year's Eve" (Note: Nancy Wilson's "What Are You Doing New Year's Eve" peaked at No. 17 on the Christmas singles chart.)	Nancy Wilson	1963	12/14/1963	6	1	1	4
52	"Rudolph the Red-Nosed Reindeer" (Note: Gene Autry first charted Billboard in 1949 with "Rudolph the Red-Nosed Reindeer" peaking at No. 1 January 7, 1950 on the Best Selling Pop Singles chart.)	Gene Autry and The Pinafores	1949	11/24/1958	6	1	1	1
53	"Medley: Winter Wonderland/Sleigh Ride" / "The Greatest Gift of All" (Note: The flip side of Dolly Parton's "Winter Wonderland/Sleigh Ride" is "Once Upon A Christmas", a duet with Kenny Rogers that peaked at No. 81 on the Hot 100, #40 on the Adult Contemporary Chart and #53 on the Hot Country Singles chart the same year, but did not chart the Christmas singles survey.)	Dolly Parton	1984	12/22/1984	6	1	1	1

=== A-Side and B-Side chartings ===
Both the A-side and B-sides of the following 6 records charted the Christmas single surveys. (Note: Bobby Vinton's Songs Of Christmas was the only EP that charted the singles survey peaking at No. 9 on 12/14/1963. It contains the 4 songs "Silver Bells", "White Christmas", "O Holy Night" and "The Christmas Song".)

Artist	Side A	Peak Date	Peak Pos.	Side B	Peak Date	Peak Pos.	Label								
Artist	Side A	Peak Date	Peak Pos.	Side B	Peak Date	Peak Pos.	Label	The Jackson 5	"Santa Claus Is Comin' to Town"	12/19/1970	1	"Christmas Won't Be The Same This Year"	12/26/1970	― (Note: "Christmas Won't Be The Same This Year" was listed twice as the flip side to the Jackson's 5 "Santa Claus Is Comin' to Town" on December 26, 1970 and December 18, 1971, but did not receive a chart ranking on its own. This was the only time Billboard used this practice on their Christmas singles chart.)	Motown 1174
Brenda Lee	"Christmas With Be Just Another Lonely Day"	12/12/1964	24	"This Time Of The Year"	12/19/1964	12	Decca 31688								
Otis Redding	"White Christmas"	12/21/1968	12	"Merry Christmas Baby"	12/28/1968	9	Atco 6631								
The Temptations	"Silent Night"	12/13/1969	7	"Rudolph, The Red-Nosed Reindeer"	12/18/1971	3	Gordy 7082								
Bobby Vinton	"Dearest Santa"	12/19/1964	8	"The Bell That Couldn't Jingle"	12/26/1964	23	Epic 9741								
Nancy Wilson	"That's What I Want For Christmas"	12/14/1963	6	"What Are You Doing New Year's Eve"	12/25/1965	17	Capitol 5084								

=== Artists with multiple charted singles ===
The following artists had more than one single chart the Christmas surveys (A-Side and B-Side chartings of the same single count as one).

Total Singles	Artist		
Total Singles	Artist	5	James Brown
Bing Crosby		5	
4	Charles Brown		
3	The Chipmunks		
3	Perry Como		
3	Brenda Lee		
2	The Beach Boys		
2	Ramsey Lewis		
2	Buck Owens		
2	Elvis Presley		
2	Harry Simeone		
2	Frank Sinatra		
2	The Temptations		
2	Carla Thomas		
2	Bobby Vinton		
2	Andy Williams		

== Top Holiday Albums ==
After no holiday charts were published in 1986, the Christmas Hits section resumed December 12, 1987 with a 30-position album survey, but Billboard stopped publishing a singles sales chart. Only alternate weeks of the survey were available in print with alternating weeks available via the Billboard Information Network. The various artist collection A Very Special Christmas topped the survey for the first 3 weeks of its return. Billboard published the chart for 2 consecutive weeks in 1987, then in 1988 began to run the survey every other week 2-3 times a holiday season.

The album-only Christmas Hits section was retitled Top Christmas Albums in 1990. Barry Manilow's Because It's Christmas was the No. 1 album for the first 2 weeks under the survey's new name. Billboard began running the chart 5 consecutive weeks each holiday season in 1991, but all weeks are still not available in print. In 1992, Billboard increased the survey to 7 weeks and started compiling the Top Christmas Albums chart using actual sales figures (SoundScan). After a 6-week run in 1993, Billboard increased the survey size to 40 positions and began publishing the chart 7–10 weeks a year starting with the 1994 holiday season.

Kenny G's Miracles: The Holiday Album topped the Christmas Albums chart for 17 weeks starting December 12, 1994, the most of any album during the 1990s. Kenny G also spent 5 more weeks at No. 1 in the nineties with his Faith: A Holiday Album from 1999. Celine Dion's These Are Special Times spent the second most weeks at the top during the 90's with 9 weeks at number one starting November 21, 1998. The album made its tenth week at No. 1 on October 29, 2016.

Christina Aguilera's My Kind of Christmas topped the chart when Billboard renames the survey Top Holiday Albums on November 25, 2000. The chart size increased to 50 positions in 2002 and expanded an 11-week run in 2006. On October 20, 2007, Billboard began publishing the chart online in October for 14–15 weeks each holiday season.

Josh Groban's Noël started a 12-week consecutive run at number one on October 27, 2007. It topped the chart 6 more weeks in 2008 making it the top charting Holiday Album of the first decade of the century. Now That's What I Call Christmas! was the second top charting album of the 2000s with 14 inconsecutive weeks at number one from 2000 to 2003. Two follow ups also topped the chart for 2 weeks each that decade, Now That's What I Call Christmas!: The Signature Collection went to number one beginning November 22, 2003 and Now That's What I Call Christmas! 3 beginning January 13, 2007. Andrea Bocelli's My Christmas, Susan Boyle's The Gift and Sarah McLachlan's Wintersong all topped the Top Holiday Albums chart for 8 weeks that decade.

On November 11, 2011, Michael Bublé's Christmas went to No. 1 for its first week. To date, it has spent 52 total weeks at No. 1 on the Top Holiday Albums, the most of any album on the entire Christmas album survey. Pentatonix spent 47 weeks at No. 1 with 4 different albums during the 2010s with 2014's That's Christmas to Me (18 weeks), 2016's A Pentatonix Christmas (18 weeks), 2018's Christmas Is Here! (2 weeks) and 2019's The Best of Pentatonix Christmas (3 weeks). The original soundtrack to 1993's The Nightmare Before Christmas has topped the chart for 15 inconsecutive weeks beginning October 21, 2017.

So far this decade, Michael Bublé's Christmas has topped the chart for 30 inconsecutive weeks. The Nightmare Before Christmas soundtrack has topped the chart for 8 weeks since 2021. Carrie Underwood's My Gift was no. 1 for 7 weeks beginning October 10, 2020. Billboard reduced the Top Holiday Album chart run to 12 weeks in 2022 then 10 weeks in 2023.

=== Most weeks at No. 1 ===
For over 60 years, Billboard has provided a Christmas holiday album survey, consecutively since the 1987 Christmas Hits charts. The following albums have spent at least 6 weeks at the No. 1 position. They have been sorted by the total weeks charted on all the various named Christmas album charts since Deejay's Favorite Christmas Disks was published on November 24, 1958. (Note: 'Billboard's online Top Holiday Album chart history goes back to the December 21, 1985 Christmas Hits chart. Only the data for the #1 position are listed for the weeks of 11/28/92, 12/5/92, 11/26/94 and 11/22/97.)

Rank	Artist	Album	Peak Date	Weeks Charted	
Rank	Artist	Album	Peak Date	at No. 1	Total
1	Michael Bublé	Christmas	11/26/2011	52	160
2	Josh Groban	Noël	10/27/2007	19	209
3	Pentatonix	That's Christmas to Me	11/8/2014	18	100
4	Pentatonix	A Pentatonix Christmas	11/12/2016	18	89
5	Kenny G	Miracles: The Holiday Album	12/3/1994	17	194 (Note: Kenny G's Miracles: The Holiday Album also charted 2 weeks in print on 11/26/1994 and 11/22/1997.)
6	Danny Elfman	The Nightmare Before Christmas (soundtrack) (Note: Tim Burton's The Nightmare Before Christmas: Special Edition also charted a total 55 weeks peaking at No. 1 for 3 weeks beginning 1/6/2007.)	10/21/2017	15	56
7	Various Artists	Now That's What I Call Christmas!	12/1/2001	14	76
8	Celine Dion	These Are Special Times	11/21/1998	10	289
9	Andy Williams	The Andy Williams Christmas Album	11/30/1963	9	91 (Note: The Andy Williams Christmas Album charted a total 30 weeks peaking at No. 1 for 9 weeks between 1963 and 1973.)
10	Andrea Bocelli	My Christmas	11/21/2009	8	80
11	Susan Boyle	The Gift	11/27/2010	8	54
12	Sarah McLachlan	Wintersong	11/18/2006	8	33
13	Carrie Underwood	My Gift	10/10/2020	7	50
14	Harry Connick Jr.	Harry for the Holidays	11/15/2003	7	35
15	Barbra Streisand	A Christmas Album	12/2/1967	6	125 (Note: Barbra Stresidand's A Christmas Album charted 24 weeks between 1967 and 1984.)
16	Mannheim Steamroller	A Fresh Aire Christmas	12/24/1988	6	118 (Note: Mannheim Steamroller's A Fresh Aire Christmas charted 3 weeks in print on 12/5/1992, 11/26/1994, and 11/22/1997.)
17	Mannheim Steamroller	Christmas Extraordinaire	11/17/2001	6	106
18	Diana Krall featuring the Clayton/Hamilton Jazz Orchestra	Christmas Songs	11/19/2005	6	37
19	Charlotte Church	Dream a Dream	12/2/2000	6	35
20	Clay Aiken	Merry Christmas With Love	12/4/2004	6	28
21	Rod Stewart	Merry Christmas, Baby	11/17/2012	6	20
22	Hanson	Snowed In	12/6/1997	6	16

=== Most weeks on the survey ===
The following albums have charted over 200 weeks on Billboard's Christmas Holiday Album surveys since November 24, 1958.

Weeks	Album	Artist	Rlsd.	Debut	Peak						
Weeks	Album	Artist	Rlsd.	Debut	Peak	357 (Note: Elvis' Christmas Album charted for 31 weeks from 1963-1973. It charted in print on 11/26/1994 and charted 189 weeks under the title It's Christmas Time beginning 2003.)	Elvis' Christmas Album	Elvis Presley	1957	12/7/1963	#2
334 (Note: Bing Crosby's White Christmas album first charted for 41 weeks under the original title, Merry Christmas, prior to 1987. It charted in print on 12/5/1992 and 11/26/1994.)	White Christmas	Bing Crosby	1945	11/24/1958	#2						
326 (Note: A Charlie Brown Christmas charted in print the week of 12/5/1992.)	A Charlie Brown Christmas (soundtrack)	Vince Guaraldi Trio	1965	12/12/1987	#2						
317 (Note: Mariah Carey's Merry Christmas charted in print the week of 11/22/1997.)	Merry Christmas	Mariah Carey	1994	11/26/1994	#1						
311 (Note: Nat "King" Cole's The Christmas Song album charted for 37 weeks prior to 1985 and also charted in print the weeks of 12/5/1992, 11/26/1994 and 11/22/1997.)	The Christmas Song	Nat King Cole	1960	12/14/1963	#1						
289	These Are Special Times	Celine Dion	1998	11/21/1998	#1						
252 (Note: The Carpenter's Christmas Portrait charted for 3 weeks prior to 1985 and also charted in print the weeks of 12/5/1992, 11/26/1994 and 11/22/1997.)	Christmas Portrait	The Carpenters	1978	12/15/1984	#2						
243	Rudolph the Red-Nosed Reindeer (soundtrack)	Burl Ives	1964	11/21/1998	#5						
242	Christmas Eve and Other Stories	Trans-Siberian Orchestra	1996	11/28/1996	#3						
209	Noël	Josh Groban	2007	11/20/2007	#1						

=== Most albums on the survey ===
The following artists or series have had at least 6 albums chart Billboard's Christmas Holiday Album surveys since November 24, 1958.

Total Albums	Artist/Series		
Total Albums	Artist/Series	22	Mormon Tabernacle/Choir at Temple Square
19	Walt Disney/Disneyland Records		
16	Mannheim Steamroller		
14	Bing Crosby		
14	Elvis Presley		
14	Twentieth Century Masters – The Christmas Collection		
13	Now That's What I Call Christmas!		
13	Tis The Season		
12	Frank Sinatra		
11	The Classic Christmas Album		
10	Jim Brickman		
10	Bill Gaither/Gloria Gaither and their Homecoming Friends/Gaither Vocal Band		
10	Pentatonix		
9	Amy Grant		
9	Kidz Bop Kids		
9	A Winter Solstice		
8	The Chipmunks		
8	Dean Martin		
8	Johnny Mathis		
8	A Very Special Christmas		
7	Perry Como		
7	Kenny Rogers		
7	Trans-Siberian Orchestra		
6	Celtic Christmas		
6	Neil Diamond		
6	Kenny G		
6	Andy Williams		
6	WOW Christmas		

== Holiday Songs ==
In the mid-1990's, holiday songs with no commercial single availability had begun appearing more often on Billboard's airplay charts. New songs like 1995's "Christmas Eve (Sarajevo 12/24)" by the Trans-Siberian Orchestra (Adult Contemporary #34, Adult Top 40 #25, Hot 100 Airplay #49) and "The Chanukah Song" by Adam Sandler (Adult Contemporary #35, Adult Top 40 #32, Hot 100 Airplay #10, Mainstream Rock #20, Modern Rock Tracks #25) would re-chart annually each Christmas season along with older titles such as 1984's "Last Christmas" by Wham! (Adult Contemporary #22, Adult Top 40 #40, Hot 100 Airplay #58) and 1979's "Wonderful Christmastime" by Paul McCartney (Adult Contemporary #29, Adult Top 40 #32)

The Hot Country Singles & Tracks and Hot R&B/Hip-Hop Airplay survey were also charting earlier classics such as The Temptations' "Silent Night" (Hot R&B Airplay #16) and new songs like Jeff Foxworthy's "Redneck 12 Days of Christmas" (Hot Country Singles & Tracks #18). On the Hot 100, Christina Aguilera's cover of "The Christmas Song (Chestnuts Roasting On An Open Fire)" peaked at #18 for 2 weeks starting December 25, 1999, and Kenny G's "Auld Lang Syne (The Millennium Mix)" peaked at No 7 on January 8, 2000, making both the first holiday songs to enter their top 40 in the past 6 years.

Billboard introduced the 25-position Holiday Songs survey online December 8, 2001. The top 15 has occasionally appeared in the print magazine. The chart differed from the discontinued best-selling Christmas singles survey(s) by ranking songs based solely on radio airplay detections as measured by Nielsen BDS of Adult Contemporary and a few Adult Top 40 stations, most of which switch to all or nearly all Christmas music around Thanksgiving. Billboard later began to compile the chart data from all-format radio airplay audience impressions, as measured by Mediabase and provided by Luminate. The first number one Holiday Song was the 1977 track "Celebrate Me Home" by Kenny Loggins. The initial chart had a 3-week run, then expanded to 6 weeks in 2002. Billboard increased the survey to 30 positions and ran the chart 6–9 weeks each holiday season starting in 2006.

Amy Grant has charted the most songs on the Holiday Song survey with nine. Michael Bublé is second with 6 charted songs. 1964's "A Holly Jolly Christmas" by Burl Ives (Holiday Songs #1) and 1963's "It's The Most Wonderful Time Of The Year" by Andy Williams (Holiday Songs #2) have both charted 132 weeks, the most of any songs on the survey. Both Brenda Lee's 1958 "Rockin" Around The Christmas Tree" (Holiday Songs #1) and Gene Autry's 1949 "Rudolph The Red-Nosed Reindeer" (Holiday Songs #2) tie for second most chart appearances with 130 charted weeks each.

The most weeks at the top of the Holiday Songs survey is held by Mariah Carey's 1994 Hot 100 Airplay Christmas classic, "All I Want for Christmas Is You". It has held the number one position for 55 weeks. Lee's "Rockin' Around The Christmas Tree" has peaked at No. 1 for a total of 30 weeks and Ives' "A Holly Jolly Christmas" has topped the survey the third most times with 20 inconsecutive weeks. Since December 4, 2010, these three songs and 1971's "Feliz Navidad" by Jose Feliciano have alternated the No. 1 position on the Holiday Songs chart.

Billboard changed the name of the Holiday Songs survey to Holiday Airplay after the launch of the Holiday 100 in 2011 and run the charts concurrently each holiday season. At over 20 years, the Holiday Airplay chart is their longest running holiday single or song survey and their second longest running holiday survey after the Top Holiday Albums chart.

=== Holiday Digital Song Sales ===
The Holiday Season Digital Song Sales survey of music download purchases debuted on October 16, 2010. Billboard published the 50-position chart for at least 12 weeks each holiday season mostly coinciding with the Top Holiday Albums chart, until they reduced it to a 7-week run at the beginning of December 2021 and then 6 weeks concurrently with the Holiday 100 in 2022. Mariah Carey's "All I Want for Christmas Is You" was the chart's first No. 1 and has topped the survey the most with 77 inconsecutive weeks. Carey has charted 4 different versions on Holiday Digital Song Sales, including the 2011 "SuperFestive!" duet with Justin Bieber that also peaked at number one for one week. Beginning November 5, 2011, Bieber's "Mistletoe" topped the chart for 11 inconsecutive weeks. "Hallelujah" by Pentatonix has spent the second most weeks at No. 1 on the survey with 19 inconsecutive weeks beginning November 12, 2016.

Holiday Digital Song Sales has charted over 750 songs, significantly more titles than any of the Holiday Songs or Christmas Singles surveys. Pentatonix has charted 49 songs on the survey. The Glee Cast, Kelly Clarkson and Michael Bublé have also charted at least 20 songs each. Carey's "All I Want For Christmas Is You", Trans-Siberian Orchestra's "Christmas Eve" (Holiday Digital Song Sales #2), and Wham!'s "Last Christmas" (Holiday Digital Song Sales #2) have appeared on all 160 weeks surveyed. The top 15 Holiday Digital Song Sales occasionally appear in the print magazine. Billboard reduced the chart to 25 positions with a 5-week run starting December 2, 2023.

== Holiday 100 ==
An increase of Christmas songs occurred on the Hot 100 in 2010 when 6 holiday songs appeared on the survey with 4 more Bubbling Under the Hot 100. On December 25, Coldplay reached No. 25 on the Hot 100 with "Christmas Lights", making it the first holiday song in their top 40 in the past 11 years. On December 10, 2011, Billboard expanded the Holiday Song chart to 50 positions, reduced it back to a 5–6 week run and renamed it Holiday Airplay. The newly reconfigured Hot Holiday Songs, like the Hot 100, ranks holiday tracks based on a formula blending airplay, download sales and streaming data as tracked by Nielsen Entertainment. The 50-position chart survey begins to appear in print and Billboard.com in early December for 5–6 weeks each year. On December 14, 2013, Holiday Songs was expanded to 100 positions and renamed the Holiday 100, although only the top 50 remain in print.

Topping the inaugural Hot Holiday Songs ranking was Mariah Carey's "All I Want for Christmas Is You". It has been No. 1 for 60 total weeks. After 34 weeks at No. 2, Brenda Lee's "Rockin' Around The Christmas Tree" topped the chart for 3 inconsecutive weeks starting December 9, 2023. The other songs that have taken the No. 1 spot on the Holiday 100 are Justin Bieber's "Mistletoe" in 2012, Ariana Grande's "Santa Tell Me" in 2015 and both Pentatonix's "Little Drummer Boy" in 2013 and "Mary, Did You Know?" for 2 weeks in 2014. Michael Bublé, Pentatonix and Bing Crosby have charted the most songs on the Holiday 100 with 15 or more each.

=== Holiday Streaming Songs ===
Billboard also began publishing their 25-position Holiday Streaming Songs chart on December 14, 2013. The survey runs for 5–6 weeks concurrently with the Holiday 100 each holiday season. The chart size increased to 50 positions in 2016. The survey measures the top streamed holiday radio songs, on-demand songs and videos from the leading U.S. online music services. Carey's "All I Want For Christmas Is You" has been No. 1 for 47 inconsecutive weeks on the survey. Besides Carey's hit, the only other songs that have topped the Holiday Streaming Songs charts are Pentatonix's "Mary, Did You Know?" for 3 weeks, Grande's "Santa Tell Me" for 2 weeks and most recently Brenda Lee's "Rockin' Around The Christmas Tree" for 6 weeks.

Michael Bublé has charted 15 songs on the Holiday Streaming Songs survey. Bing Crosby and Pentatonix tie for second most songs with 10 each. Carey's "All I Want For Christmas Is You", Lee's "Rockin' Around The Christmas Tree", Nat King Cole's "The Christmas Song (Merry Christmas To You)" (Holiday Streaming Songs #2), Gene Autry's "Rudolph The Red-Nosed Reindeer" (Holiday Streaming Songs #2) and 2011's "It's Beginning To Look A Lot Like Christmas" by Michael Bublé (Holiday Streaming Songs #2) have charted all 58 weeks of the Holiday Streaming Songs survey. Mariah Carey's chart topping success and other songs that appear on Billboard's Holiday Song surveys every year have met criticism.

=== Holiday 100 Songwriters and Producers ===
In 2022, Billboard launched the Holiday 100 Songwriters and Producers charts that run during the same seasonal period as the Holiday 100. The weekly 25 position charts are based on points accrued by a songwriter and producer, respectively, for each attributed song. They join Billboard's 26 other songwriter and producer rankings covering the Hot 100 and all other "Hot"-named genre charts: Christian, country, dance/electronic, gospel, Latin, R&B/hip-hop, R&B, rap, rock & alternative, rock, alternative and hard rock. On the inaugural Holiday 100 Songwriters survey, Johnny Marks (who died in 1985 at age 75) was No. 1 for seven songwriting credits on the Holiday 100. Lee Gillette (who died in 1981 at age 68) topped the inaugural Holiday 100 Producers chart for seven production credits. Both have held their number 1 positions for the 12 weeks each chart has run.

==== Holiday 100 most charted songs ====
Billboard's Holiday 100 has charted 305 songs. The following ranked by peak position have consecutively charted all 68 weeks since its debut on December 10, 2011.

Rank	Song	Artist	Year Rlsd.	Peak Date	Peak Pos.	Weeks Charted		
Rank	Song	Artist	Year Rlsd.	Peak Date	Peak Pos.	Peak	Top 10	Top 40
1	"All I Want For Christmas Is You" (Note: Mariah Carey first peaked at No. 12 on the Hot 100 Airplay chart on December 31, 1994 with "All I Want For Christmas Is You". Songs with no commercial single available were ineligible for the Hot 100 until December 5, 1998. The song debuted on the Hot 100 at No. 83 on Christmas Day 1999 and went to No. 1 in 2019.)	Mariah Carey	1994	12/10/2011	1	60 (Note: Mariah Carey's "All I Want For Christmas Is You" peaked at No. 1 for 6 weeks on the Holiday Songs chart prior to the Holiday 100. It also peaked at No. 1 for 7 on the Holiday Digital Songs Sales chart in 2010 prior to the Holiday 100.)	68	68
2	"Rockin' Around the Christmas Tree" (Note: Brenda Lee's "Rockin' Around the Christmas Tree" peaked at No. 1 for 23 weeks on the Holiday Songs chart prior to the Holiday 100.)	Brenda Lee	1958	12/9/2023	1	3	68	68
3	"Mistletoe" (Note: Justin Bieber's "Mistletoe" peaked at No. 11 on the Hot 100 in 2011.)	Justin Bieber	2011	1/7/2012	1	1	5	68
4	"It's The Most Wonderful Time Of The Year" (Note: Andy Williams' It's The Most Wonderful Time Of The Year" peaked at No. 5 on the Hot 100 in 2021.)	Andy Williams	1963	12/8/2018	2	4 (Note: Andy Williams' "It's The Most Wonderful Time Of The Year" peaked at No. 2 for 3 weeks on the Holiday Songs chart prior to the Holiday 100.)	68	68
5	"Jingle Bell Rock" (Note: Bobby Helms' "Jingle Bell Rock" peaked at No. 1 for 9 weeks on the Holiday Songs chart prior to the Holiday 100.)	Bobby Helms (Note: Bobby Helms' "Jingle Bell Rock" began to re-chart the Hot 100 annually in 2015, eventually peaking at No. 3 in 2020.)	1957	12/24/2016	2	2	66	68
6	"The Christmas Song (Merry Christmas To You)" (Note: Nat King Cole's "The Christmas Song" peaked at No. 1 for 7 weeks on the Holiday Songs chart prior to the Holiday 100.)	Nat King Cole & Ralph Carmichael Orch.	1961	1/4/2014	2	1	63	68
7	"A Holly Jolly Christmas" (Note: Burl Ives' "Holly Jolly Christmas" peaked at No. 1 for 16 weeks on the Holiday Songs chart prior to the Holiday 100.)	Burl Ives	1964	12/14/2019	3	4	64	68
8	"Feliz Navidad" (Note: Jose Feliciano's "Feliz Navidad" peaked at No. 2 on the Holiday Songs chart prior to the Holiday 100.)	José Feliciano (Note: Jose Feliciano's "Feliz Navidad" first entered the Hot 100 in 2017 and has re-charted annually, peaking at No. 6 in 2021.)	1970	1/7/2012	3	1	63	68
9	"Last Christmas" (Note: Wham's "Last Christmas" first charted in Billboard on the Hot 100 airplay chart at No. 58 in 1997. It peaked at #4 on the Hot 100 in 2023)	Wham!	1984	12/7/2019	3	1	51	67
10	"Christmas Eve (Sarajevo 12/24)" (Note: The same recording of "Christmas Eve (Sarajevo 12/24)" first charted by Savatage on the Hot 100 Airplay chart in 1995, then re-charted as by Trans-Siberian Orchestra peaking at No. 49 in 1996 and 1997.) (Note: Trans-Siberian Orchestra's "Christmas Eve" peaked at No. 3 for 4 weeks on the Holiday Digital Songs Sales chart in 2010 prior to the Holiday 100.)	Trans-Siberian Orchestra	1995	12/5/2012	4	1	19	54
11	"White Christmas" (Note: Bing Crosby's "White Christmas" peaked at No. 1 on the Holiday Songs chart prior to the Holiday 100.)	Bing Crosby with Ken Darby Singers & John Scott Trotter and his Orchestra	1947	12/12/2015	5	2	19	67
12	"Rudolph the Red-Nosed Reindeer" (Note: Gene Autry's "Rudolph the Red-Nosed Reindeer" peaked at No. 3 for 2 weeks on the Holiday Songs chart prior to the Holiday 100.)	Gene Autry and The Pinafores	1949	12/22/2018	7	3	13	67
13	"It's Beginning to Look Like Christmas" (Note: Michael Buble's "It's Beginning to Look a Lot Like Christmas" peaked at No. 96 on the Hot 100 in 2011. It began charting the Hot 100 annually in 2020 peaking at No. 19 in 2023.)	Michael Bublé	2011	12/4/2021	8	1	5	66
14	"Christmas Canon"	Trans-Siberian Orchestra	1998	12/17/2011	9	2	4	38
15	"Happy Xmas (War Is Over)" (Note: John Lennon's "Happy Xmas" peaked at No. 2 for 4 weeks on the Holiday Songs chart prior to the Holiday 100. It also peaked at No. 1 on the Holiday Digital Songs Sales chart on October 23, 2010 prior to the Holiday 100.)	John & Yoko & the Plastic Ono Band with The Harlem Community Choir (Note: John Lennon's "Happy Xmas" peaked at No. 38 on the Hot 100 in 2022.)	1971	12/10/2011	9	1	2	62
16	"Happy Holiday/The Holiday Season" (Note: Andy William's "Happy Holiday/The Holiday Season" peaked at No. 9 for 2 weeks on the Holiday Songs chart prior to the Holiday 100.)	Andy Williams (Note: Andy Williams'" Happy Holiday/The Holiday Season" peaked at No. 18 on the Hot 100 in 2021.)	1963	12/14/2019	12	7	—	60
17	"Blue Christmas" (Note: Elvis Prelsey's "Blue Christmas" peaked at No. 9 for 3 weeks on the Holiday Songs chart prior to the Holiday 100.)	Elvis Presley (Note: Elvis Presley's "Blue Christmas" began to re-chart the Hot 100 annually in 2017, peaking at No. 18 on January 6, 2024.)	1957	1/5/2013	12	1	—	63
18	"You're A Mean One, Mr. Grinch" (Note: "You're A Mean One, Mr. Grinch" first peaked at No. 2 on the Holiday Digital Songs Sales chart on January 1, 2011 prior to the Holiday 100.)	Thurl Ravenscroft (Note: "You're A Mean One, Mr. Grinch" peaked at No. 31 on the Hot 100 in 2022.)	1966	1/7/2017	14	1	—	68
19	"Wonderful Christmastime" (Note: Paul McCartney's "Wonderful Christmastime" first charted Cashbox magazine in 1979 on their Top 100 peaking at No. 83 on January 12, 1980. It first appeared in Billboard peaking at No. 10 on its Christmas Hits chart in 1984.) (Note: Paul McCartney's "Wonderful Christmastime" peaked at No. 8 for 3 weeks on the Holiday Songs chart prior to the Holiday 100.)	Paul McCartney (Note: Paul McCartney's "Wonderful Christmastime" first charted the Hot 100 in 2018, peaking at No. 26 on January 6, 2024.)	1979	12/8/2018	15	2	—	68
20	"It's Beginning to Look Like Christmas" (Note: Johnny Mathis' "It's Beginning to Look Like Christmas" peaked at No. 3 on the Holiday Songs chart prior to the Holiday 100.)	Johnny Mathis	1986	12/10/2016	15	2	—	38
21	"Santa Claus Is Comin' to Town" (Note: Bruce Springsteen's "Santa Claus Is Comin' to Town" peaked at No. 13 on the Holiday Songs chart prior to the Holiday 100.)	Bruce Springsteen	1981	1/7/2012	16	1	—	25
22	"Christmastime Is Here" (Note: The Vince Guaraldi Trio's "Christmastime Is Here" peaked at No. 39 on the Hot 100 on January 6, 2024.)	Vince Guaraldi Trio	1965	1/7/2017	17	1	—	61
23	"Santa Baby" (Note: Eartha Kitt's "Santa Baby" first charted in 1953 peaking at No. 4 on January 2, 1954 on Billboards Best Selling Singles chart.)	Eartha Kitt with Henri René and his Orch.	1953	12/21/2013	18	2	—	52
24	"It's Beginning to Look Like Christmas" (Note: Bing Crosby's "It's Beginning to Look a Lot Like Christmas" peaked at No. 12 on the Holiday Songs chart prior to the Holiday 100.)	Bing Crosby with Jud Conlon's; Rhythmaires & John Scott Trotter & his Orch.	1951	12/10/2011	18	2	—	34
25	"Please Come Home For Christmas" (Note: The Eagles' "Please Come Home For Christmas" peaked at No. 2 for 2 weeks on the Holiday Songs chart prior to the Holiday 100.)	Eagles	1978	1/5/2013	18	1	—	59

The following songs debuted on the Holiday 100 after December 20, 2011, and have consecutively charted every week following for at least two holiday seasons.

Song	Artist	Year Rlsd.	Debut Date	Peak Pos.	Weeks Charted	
Song	Artist	Year Rlsd.	Debut Date	Peak Pos.	Peak	Total
"Sleigh Ride" (Note: The Ronettes's "Sleigh Ride" peaked at No. 8 on the Hot 100 in 2023.)	The Ronettes	1963	12/8/2012	7	1	63
"Linus & Lucy" (Note: The Vince Guaraldi Trio's "Linus & Lucy" peaked at No. 37 on the Hot 100 in 2022.)	Vince Guaraldi Trio	1965	12/8/2012	17	2	63
"Holly Jolly Christmas"	Michael Bublé	2011	12/8/2012	22	1	63
"Underneath the Tree" (Note: Kelly Clarkson's "Underneath the Tree" peaked at No. 11 on the Hot 100 in 2023.)	Kelly Clarkson	2013	12/14/2013	8	1	58
"Mary, Did You Know?"	Pentatonix (Note: Pentatonix's "Mary, Did You Know?" peaked at No. 26 on the Hot 100.)	2014	12/13/2014	1	2	53
"Santa Tell Me" (Note: Ariana Grande's "Santa Tell Me" peaked at No. 11 on the Hot 100.)	Ariana Grande	2014	12/13/2014	1	1	53
"Run Rudolph Run" (Note: Chuck Berry's "Run Rudolph Run" first charted December 28, 1958 on the Hot 100 peaking at No. 69. It began to re-chart annual in 2018, peaking at No. 10 in 2021.)	Chuck Berry	1958	12/20/2014	9	1	55
"Hallelujah" (Note: Pentatonix's "Hallelujah" peaked at No. 23 on the Hot 100.)	Pentatonix	2016	12/10/2016	2	3	43
"Deck The Halls"	Nat King Cole (Note: Nat King Cole's "Deck The Halls" peaked at No. 16 on the Hot 100 in 2022.)	1960	12/8/2018	13	1	33
"Cozy Little Christmas" (Note: Katy Perry's "Cozy Little Christmas" peaked at No. 53 on the Hot 100.)	Katy Perry	2018	12/8/2018	30	2	33
"Silver Bells"	Andy Williams	1965	12/8/2018	36	2	33
"O Come, All Ye Faithful"	Nat King Cole	1960	12/8/2018	38	1	33
"Like It's Christmas" (Note: The Jonas Brothers' "Cozy Little Christmas" peaked at No. 40 on the Hot 100 on January 6, 2024.)	Jonas Brothers	2019	12/7/2019	18	1	28
"Merry Christmas" (Note: Ed Sheeran and Elton John's "Merry Christmas" peaked at No. 42 on the Hot 100 in 2022.)	Ed Sheeran & Elton John	2021	12/18/2021	29	1	16

==== Holiday 100 artists with the most charted songs ====
The following artists have had at least 4 songs chart the Holiday 100.

Total Songs	Artist		
Total Songs	Artist	20	Michael Bublé
18	Pentatonix		
15	Bing Crosby		
10	Ariana Grande		
10	Frank Sinatra		
8	Mariah Carey		
8	Nat King Cole		
7	Andy Williams		
6	Justin Bieber		
6	Kelly Clarkson		
6	Dean Martin		
6	Johnny Mathis		
5	The Carpenters		
5	Amy Grant		
5	Meghan Trainor		
4	Gene Autry		
4	Perry Como		
4	Celine Dion		
4	The Percy Faith Orchestra		
4	John Legend		
4	Taylor Swift		
4	Carrie Underwood		
4	Stevie Wonder		

== Lists of albums, singles and songs on Billboard's Christmas/Holiday charts ==
- Best Bets for Christmas 1963–1973
- Christmas Hits 1983–1989
- List of number one Holiday Songs:
  - 2000s
  - 2010s
  - 2020s
- Top Christmas Albums of the 1990s
- Top Holiday Albums number ones:
  - 2000s
  - 2010s
  - 2020s

== See also ==
- Billboard magazine
  - Charts
  - Greatest Christmas Hits CD collection
  - Hot 100 Holiday Songs with the Biggest drops off the chart
  - Hot 100 Holiday Songs with the Most weeks on the chart
  - List of Hot 100 top-ten Holiday season singles:
    - 2017 2018 2019 2020
    - 2021 2022 2023
- Christmas: Music
- Hit Christmas singles in the United Kingdom
- Popular Christmas singles in the United States
- U.S. best-selling Christmas albums & singles

== Billboard external links ==
=== Articles ===
- Billboard’s Top 25 Holiday Albums, From Crosby & Cole to Bublé & Bocelli: By Paul Grein, 12/8/2022
- The 100 Best Christmas Songs of All Time: Billboard Staff List, 11/30/2022
- The Best Holiday Song From Each of the Last 50 Years: By Andrew Unterberger, 12/1/2017

=== Christmas Singles Chart ===
- Internet Archive: a non-profit library of millions of free books, movies, software, music, websites, and more. (Billboard chart reference books)
- Records That Made Billboard's Christmas Singles Charts 1963-1985 (45cat.com)
- WorldRadioHistory.Com: A non-profit free online library (back issues of Billboard and other music charts)

=== Current Holiday charts (Subscription required for full chart data.) ===
- Airplay
- Digital Song Sales
- Holiday 100
- Holiday 100 Producers
- Holiday 100 Songwriters
- Streaming Songs
- Top Albums

=== Greatest of All Time ===
- Holiday 100 Songs
- Top Holiday Albums
