= Billboard Christmas Hits 1983–1989 =

Music charts

The Billboard Christmas Hits survey ran each holiday season between 1983 until 1989 except for 1986. The singles chart only ran a total 6 of weeks between 1983 and 1985.

== List of number one Billboard Christmas Hits 1983–1989 ==
These are the Billboard Christmas Hits chart number-one albums and singles from 1983 until 1989.

Issue date	Albums	Artist	Singles	Artist	Ref.
December 17, 1983	Christmas	Kenny Rogers	"White Christmas"	Bing Crosby	
December 24, 1983	Christmas	Kenny Rogers	"Grandma Got Run Over by a Reindeer"	Elmo N' Patsy	
December 15, 1984	Once Upon a Christmas	Kenny Rogers and Dolly Parton	"Grandma Got Run Over by a Reindeer"	Elmo N' Patsy	
December 22, 1984	Once Upon a Christmas	Kenny Rogers and Dolly Parton	"Grandma Got Run Over by a Reindeer"	Elmo N' Patsy	
December 21, 1985	Alabama Christmas	Alabama	"Grandma Got Run Over by a Reindeer"	Elmo N' Patsy	
December 28, 1985	Alabama Christmas	Alabama	"Santa Claus Is Coming to Town"	Bruce Springsteen	
December 12, 1987	A Very Special Christmas	Various artists	no chart	no chart	
December 19, 1987	A Very Special Christmas	Various artists	no chart	no chart	
December 10, 1988	A Very Special Christmas	Various artists	no chart	no chart	
December 24, 1988	A Fresh Aire Christmas	Mannheim Steamroller	no chart	no chart	
January 7, 1989	A Fresh Aire Christmas	Mannheim Steamroller	no chart	no chart	
December 23, 1989	Merry, Merry Christmas	New Kids on the Block	no chart	no chart	
January 6, 1990	Merry, Merry Christmas	New Kids on the Block	no chart	no chart	

== Top Christmas Hits Albums of the 1980s ==
The Billboard Christmas Hits album charts ran a total of 13 weeks. Those that reached the top ten are ranked below. The peak position reflects the highest position the album reached on the Christmas Hits chart between December 17, 1983 and January 6, 1990, but the top 10 and total weeks include the total weeks charted since the first Christmas Records chart in 1958.

The current online chart history of Billboard Top Holiday Albums begins with the December 21, 1985 Christmas Hits album chart.

Rank	Album	Artist	Year Rlsd.	Peak Date	Peak Pos.	Weeks		
Rank	Album	Artist	Year Rlsd.	Peak Date	Peak Pos.	Peak	Top 10	Chart
1	A Very Special Christmas	Various Artists	1987	12/12/1987	#1	3	7	7
2	Once Upon A Christmas	Kenny Rogers & Dolly Parton	1984	12/15/1984	#1	2	5	11
3	Alabama Christmas	Alabama	1985	12/21/1985	#1	2	4	9
4	Kenny Rogers' Christmas Album	Kenny Rogers	1981	12/17/1983	#1	2	4	6
5	A Fresh Aire Christmas	Mannheim Steamroller	1988	12/24/1988	#1	2	4	4
6	Merry, Merry Christmas	New Kids On The Block	1989	12/23/1989	#1	2	2	2
7	Mannheim Steamroller Christmas	Mannheim Steamroller	1984	12/21/1985	#2	5	11	11
8	A Christmas Album (Note: Barbra Streisand's A Christmas Album peaked at #1 on the Best Bets For Christmas 12/2/1967.)	Barbra Streisand	1967	12/17/1983	#2	2	29	33
9	Christmas Portrait	The Carpenters	1978	12/15/1984	#2	2	10	13
10	December	George Winston	1982	12/19/1987	#2	2	9	9
11	Merry Christmas	Bing Crosby	1955	12/17/1983	#3 (Note: Bing Crosby's Merry Christmas peaked at #2 on the Christmas Records chart 12/26/1964.)	2	36	49
12	Christmas Rap (Profile 1247)	Various Artists	1987	12/12/1987	#4	3	3	3
13	Christmas Wishes	Anne Murray	1981	12/17/1983	#4	2	4	6
14	A GRP Christmas Collection	Various Artists	1988	12/24/1988	#5	3	4	4
15	The Christmas Song (Note: Nat "King" Cole's The Christmas Song peaked at #2 on the Best Bets For Christmas 12/13/1969.)	Nat King Cole	1963	12/17/1983	#5	2	40	46
16	An Old Time Christmas	Randy Travis	1989	12/23/1989	#5	1	2	2
17	Elvis' Christmas Album (Note: Elvis' Christmas Album peaked at #2 on the Top Christmas Sellers 12/11/1965.)	Elvis Presley	1957	12/21/1985	#6	1	32	41
18	O Holy Night	Luciano Pavarotti/Kurt Herbert Adler/National Philharmonic Orchestra	1976	12/15/1984	#6	1	4	8
19	Give Love at Christmas	The Temptations	1980	12/17/1983	#6	1	2	9
20	A Winter Solstice II	Various Artists	1988	12/24/1988	#8	2	2	4
21	A Chipmunk Christmas	The Chipmunks	1981	12/22/1984	#8	1	3	3
22	Christmas at Our House	Barbara Mandrell	1984	12/15/1984	#8	1	2	2
23	Grandma Got Run Over By A Reindeer	Elmo & Patsy	1982	12/12/1987	#8	1	1	7
24	Christmas Time with the Judds	The Judds	1987	12/12/1987	#9	3	3	6
25	A Charlie Brown Christmas (soundtrack)	Vince Guaraldi Trio	1965	12/24/1988	#9	2	3	7
26	Pretty Paper	Willie Nelson	1979	12/17/1983	#9	2	2	2
27	A Christmas Album	Amy Grant	1983	12/28/1985	#9	1	2	9
28	Christmas All Over the World	New Edition	1985	12/21/1985	#9	1	2	2
29	My Gift To You	Alexander O'Neal	1988	1/7/1989	#9	1	1	2
30	Christmas with Placido	Placido Domingo	1981	12/15/1984	#9	1	1	1
31	The Christmas Album	Air Supply	1987	12/19/1987	#10	2	2	3
32	A Jolly Christmas from Frank Sinatra	Frank Sinatra (Note: A Jolly Christmas from Frank Sinatra peaked at #2 on Deejay's Favorite Christmas Disks 11/24/1958.)	1957	12/22/1984	#10	1	2	13
33	A Christmas Together	John Denver and The Muppets	1979	12/17/1983	#10	1	1	1

== See also ==
- Billboard Best Bets for Christmas 1963-1973
- Billboard Christmas Holiday Charts
- Billboard Top Christmas Albums of the 1990s
