= The Classic Christmas Album (Barbra Streisand album) =

Compilation album by Barbra Streisand
- Released: September 27, 2013
- Recorded: 1966–2001
- Genre: Christmas
- Length: 55:17
- Label: Legacy; Sony Music Entertainment
- Producer: Didier C. Deutsch; Jeffrey James; Tim Sturges

Barbra Streisand chronology
| Release Me (2012) | The Classic Christmas Album (2013) | Back to Brooklyn (2013) |

The Classic Christmas Album is a compilation album of holiday music by American vocalist Barbra Streisand, with all material selected from her two prior releases A Christmas Album (1967) and Christmas Memories (2001). Produced by Didier C. Deutsch, Jeffrey James, and Tim Sturges, the collection was initially released on September 27, 2013, through Legacy Recordings and Sony Music Entertainment, with a revised version released digitally a few months later and physically on October 7, 2014.

Responding positively to the compilation, critics from AllMusic rated both versions of The Classic Christmas Album 3.5 out of 5 stars. It was greeted by moderate success, peaking at number 95 on the Billboard 200 and at number two on the Top Holiday Albums component chart. It also charted in the Czech Republic at number 93.

== Release ==
The Classic Christmas Album collects previously distributed material from Streisand's music catalog. Album label Legacy Recordings announced plans to release Christmas collection albums from several musicians, including Streisand, Frank Sinatra, Johnny Mathis, Perry Como, and Il Divo. The compilation was produced by Didier C. Deutsch, Jeffrey James, and Tim Sturges, while Streisand, Mike Berniker, Robbie Buchanan, Jack Gold, William Ross, and Ettore Stratta were credited as the producers of the album's original recordings. The 2013 digital edition features different photography compared to the original release, in addition to a new overall sequence; this version had a subsequent CD release on October 7, 2014, by Legacy and Columbia Records.

== Critical reception ==
Professional ratings
Review scores
| Source | Rating |
|---|---|
| AllMusic; 2013 version | 3.5/5 stars |
| AllMusic; 2014 version | 3.5/5 stars |

Regarding the 2013 standard release, AllMusic's Steve Leggett awarded The Classic Christmas Album 3.5 out of 5 stars, even though he noted how simple it is to create a holiday album within a small amount of time. For the 2013 digital version and 2014 physical release, Stephen Thomas Erlewine from the same publication gave the same rating and wrote: "this holds together well because it's impeccably arranged, produced and performed and, as it contains the bulk of each holiday record from Barbra, it's a nice bargain to boot."

== Commercial performance ==
In the United States, the album debuted at number 150 on the Billboard 200 chart for the week ending November 30, 2013. The following publication revealed it dropped to number 152 and the week after that it moved to number 193. However, on December 21 of the same year, The Classic Christmas Album rose and peaked at number 95 on the list, increasing its position by 98 places. It spent an additional two weeks on the publication's list before dropping off the chart completely. In addition to its time spent on the Billboard 200, it was reported that the record was number 75 on the Top Current Albums component chart, which ranks the best-selling albums of the week in the United States. For the Holiday Albums chart, the album debuted and peaked at number 2, blocked from the top spot by the compilation album Now That's What I Call Christmas! (2001).

During the following holiday season in 2014, the record debuted on the Top Catalog Albums component chart, where it peaked at number 28 for the week ending January 3, 2015. The Classic Christmas Album also re-entered several charts. It was at number 159 on the Billboard 200, reappearing along with Streisand's 1967 Christmas album, A Christmas Album, which was currently at number 194. To date, her record has spent 11 weeks on the chart. Outside of North America, it peaked at number 93 in the Czech Republic.

== Track listing ==
The Classic Christmas Album – 2013 edition
| No. | Title | Writer(s) | Original Album | Length |
|---|---|---|---|---|
| 1. | "Have Yourself a Merry Little Christmas" | Hugh Martin, Ralph Blane | A Christmas Album | 3:11 |
| 2. | "The Christmas Song (Chestnuts Roasting on an Open Fire)" | Robert Wells, Mel Tormé | A Christmas Album | 3:58 |
| 3. | "I'll Be Home for Christmas" | Walter Kent, Kim Gannon, Buck Ram | Christmas Memories | 4:13 |
| 4. | "A Christmas Love Song" | Alan Bergman; Marilyn Bergman; Johnny Mandel | Christmas Memories | 3:58 |
| 5. | "The Best Gift" | Lan O'Kun | A Christmas Album | 3:11 |
| 6. | "It Must Have Been the Mistletoe" | Douglas Konecky; Justin Wilde | Christmas Memories | 3:11 |
| 7. | "I Remember" | Stephen Sondheim | Christmas Memories | 4:58 |
| 8. | "I Wonder as I Wander" | John Jacob Niles | A Christmas Album | 3:16 |
| 9. | "Sleep in Heavenly Peace (Silent Night)" | Franz Gruber, Josef Mohr | A Christmas Album | 3:04 |
| 10. | "Snowbound" | Russell Faith; Clarence Kehner | Christmas Memories | 3:01 |
| 11. | "Jingle Bells?" | James Lord Pierpont; New adaptation by Jack Gold and Marty Paich | A Christmas Album | 1:54 |
| 12. | "My Favorite Things" | Oscar Hammerstein II, Richard Rodgers | A Christmas Album | 3:06 |
| 13. | "Christmas Lullaby" | Ann Hampton Callaway | Christmas Memories | 3:31 |
| 14. | "O Little Town of Bethlehem" | Phillips Brooks, Lewis Redner; New adaptation by Jack Gold | A Christmas Album | 2:55 |
| 15. | "Christmas Mem'ries" | A. Bergman; M. Bergman; Don Costa | Christmas Memories | 4:47 |
| 16. | "White Christmas" | Irving Berlin | A Christmas Album | 3:03 |
| Total length: | | | | 55:17 |

The Classic Christmas Album – 2013 digital edition & 2014 physical edition
| No. | Title | Writer(s) | Original Album | Length |
|---|---|---|---|---|
| 1. | "Jingle Bells?" | James Lord Pierpont; New adaptation by Jack Gold and Marty Paich | A Christmas Album | 1:54 |
| 2. | "I'll Be Home for Christmas" | Walter Kent, Kim Gannon, Buck Ram | Christmas Memories | 4:13 |
| 3. | "Sleep in Heavenly Peace (Silent Night)" | Franz Gruber, Josef Mohr | A Christmas Album | 3:04 |
| 4. | "What Are You Doing New Year's Eve?" | Frank Loesser | Christmas Memories | 3:54 |
| 5. | "My Favorite Things" | Oscar Hammerstein II, Richard Rodgers | A Christmas Album | 3:06 |
| 6. | "Ave Maria Op. 52 No. 6" | Franz Schubert | Christmas Memories | 3:25 |
| 7. | "I Remember" | Stephen Sondheim | Christmas Memories | 4:58 |
| 8. | "One God" | Ervin Drake; Jimmy Shirl | Christmas Memories | 3:39 |
| 9. | "Christmas Lullaby" | Ann Hampton Callaway | Christmas Memories | 3:31 |
| 10. | "The Best Gift" | Lan O'Kun | A Christmas Album | 3:11 |
| 11. | "I Wonder as I Wander" | John Jacob Niles | A Christmas Album | 3:16 |
| 12. | "Snowbound" | Russell Faith; Clarence Kehner | Christmas Memories | 3:01 |
| 13. | "Christmas Mem'ries" | A. Bergman; M. Bergman; Don Costa | Christmas Memories | 4:47 |
| 14. | "Gounod's Ave Maria" | Charles Gounod | A Christmas Album | 3:26 |
| 15. | "The Lord's Prayer" | Albert Hay Malotte | A Christmas Album | 2:43 |
| Total length: | | | | 52:08 |

== Charts ==
Weekly charts for The Classic Christmas Album
| Chart (2013–2016) | Peak position |
|---|---|
| Czech Albums (ČNS IFPI) | 93 |
| US Billboard 200 | 95 |
| US Top Catalog Albums (Billboard) | 28 |
| US Top Current Albums (Billboard) | 75 |
| US Top Holiday Albums (Billboard) | 2 |
