= Jim Nabors discography =

Albums recorded by singer-actor Jim Nabors. Nabors recorded multiple albums for Columbia Records and Ranwood Records. Like many easy listening pop vocalists of the period Nabors had little U.S. chart singles success. His singles "Love Me With All Your Heart" reached No. 111 in the Cash Box survey (1966), and "The Impossible Dream" hit the top 30 on the Australian Go-Set chart (1968). His albums were considerably more successful with twelve of them placing on Billboard magazine's Hot 200 chart and three of them earning Nabors gold records between 1968 and 1974.

== Albums ==
| Title | Details | Peak positions |
| Title | Details | Billboard Hot 200 |
|---|---|---|
| Shazam! Gomer Pyle U. S. M. C. | Release date: 1965; Label: Columbia Records | — |
| Jim Nabors Sings Love Me with All Your Heart | Release date: 1966; Label: Columbia Records | 34 |
| Jim Nabors' Christmas Album | Release date: 1966; Label: Columbia Records | 1 |
| By Request | Release date: 1967; Label: Columbia Records | 50 |
| The Things I Love | Release date: 1967; Label: Columbia Records | 67 |
| Kiss Me Goodbye | Release date: 1968; Label: Columbia Records | 153 |
| The Lord's Prayer and other Sacred Songs | Release date: 1969; Label: Columbia Records | — |
| Galveston | Release date: 1970; Label: Columbia Records | 145 |
| The Jim Nabors Hour | Release date: 1970; Label: Columbia Records | 34 |
| Everything is Beautiful | Release date: 1970; Label: Columbia Records | 124 |
| For The Good Times | Release date: 1970; Label: Columbia Records | 75 |
| Help Me Make it Through the Night | Release date: 1971; Label: Columbia Records | 122 |
| Somewhere My Love | Release date: 1971; Label: Columbia Records | — |
| How Great Thou Art | Release date: 1971; Label: Columbia Records | — |
| The Way of Love | Release date: 1972; Label: Columbia Records | 157 |
| Man of La Mancha | Release date: 1972; Label: Columbia Records | — |
| Merry Christmas | Release date: 1972; Label: Columbia Records | — |
| The Twelfth of Never | Release date: 1973; Label: Columbia Records | — |
| A Very Special Love Song | Release date: 1974; Label: Columbia Records | — |
| Peace in the Valley | Release date: 1974; Label: Columbia Records | — |
| Old Time Religion | Release date: 1976; Label: Ranwood Records | — |
| Town and Country | Release date: 1976; Label: Ranwood Records | — |
| I See God | Release date: 1977; Label: Ranwood Records | — |
| Sincerely | Release date: 1977; Label: Ranwood Records | — |
| Hawaiian Memories | Release date: 1984; Label: Naborly Records | — |
| 16 Most Requested Songs | Release date: 1989; Label: Columbia Records | — |
| When He Spoke | Release date: 2000; Label: Mavis Records | — |
"—" denotes releases that did not chart

== Singles ==
| Year | Titles (A-side / B-side) Both sides from same album except where indicated | Label | Album |
|---|---|---|---|
| 1958 | "There's No Tomorrow" b/w "I'm Working"; As "Jimmy Nabors" | Roulette 4105 | Non-album tracks |
| 1966 | "Old Blue" b/w "Shazam!" | Columbia 43395 | Shazam! |
| 1967 | "Love Me With All Your Heart" b/w "Rock-A-Bye Your Baby With A Dixie Melody" | Columbia 43553 | Jim Nabors Sings "Love Me With All Your Heart" |
| 1967 | "You Don't Know Me" b/w "You're Gonna Hear From Me" | Columbia 43751 | Jim Nabors Sings "Love Me With All Your Heart" |
| 1967 | "You Know You Don't Want Me" b/w "It Hurts To Say Goodbye" | Columbia 44114 | By Request |
| 1967 | "White Christmas" b/w "In A Humble Place" | Columbia 44359 | Jim Nabors' Christmas Album |
| 1968 | "The Impossible Dream" b/w "Time After Time" (from By Request) | Columbia 44462 | Jim Nabors Sings "Love Me With All Your Heart" |
| 1968 | "I Must Have Been Out Of My Mind" b/w "To Give" | Columbia 44537 | Kiss Me Goodbye |
| 1969 | "It's My Life" b/w "Young Hearts" (Non-album track) | Columbia 44965 | The Jim Nabors Hour |
| 1969 | "I Was A King At Jesus' Birth" b/w "O Holy Night" (from Jim Nabors Christmas Album) | Columbia 45053 | Non-album track |
| 1970 | "Tomorrow Never Comes" b/w "It's My Life" | Columbia 45126 | The Jim Nabors Hour |
| 1970 | "I'll Begin Again" b/w "Louisiana Lady" | Columbia 45271 | For The Good Times -- The Jim Nabors Hour |
| 1972 | "(At) The End (of a Rainbow)" b/w "It Won't Hurt To Try It" (Non-album track) | Columbia 45636 | The Way Of Love |
| 1973 | "Cardboard, Crayons and Clay" b/w "Oh Babe, What Would You Say" | Columbia 45932 | The Twelfth Of Never |
| 1977 | "Always Leave 'Em Laughin'" b/w "Sing Me A Love Song" | Ranwood 1081 | Sincerely |
