= Sweet Little Jesus Boy =

Christmas song composed by Robert MacGimsey

Song by Lawrence Tibbett
- Published: 1934
- Genre: Christmas
- Songwriter: Robert MacGimsey

"Sweet Little Jesus Boy" is a spiritual Christmas song composed by Robert MacGimsey and published in 1934 by Carl Fischer Music.

Baritone Lawrence Tibbett was the first to record it. Robert Merrill covered the song in 1947 (Victor 10-1303). Other versions were subsequently recorded by various artists including Mahalia Jackson, Andy Williams, Kenny Rogers and Trisha Yearwood.

== Lyrics ==
The song's lyrics are retrospective, one person singing for a group of people, collectively asking Jesus for His forgiveness for the way He was treated- from being born in a manger to His crucifixion, with the recurring statement, "We didn't know who you were".

== See also ==
- List of Christmas carols
