= The Classic Christmas Album =

The Classic Christmas Album may refer to:

- The Classic Christmas Album, a 2013 Alabama compilation
- The Classic Christmas Album, a 2011 Tony Bennett compilation
- The Classic Christmas Album, a 2013 Johnny Cash compilation
- The Classic Christmas Album, a 2015 Celtic Thunder compilation
- The Classic Christmas Album, a 2014 Perry Como compilation
- The Classic Christmas Album, a 2012 Doris Day compilation
- The Classic Christmas Album, a 2012 John Denver compilation
- The Classic Christmas Album, a 2013 Neil Diamond compilation
- The Classic Christmas Album, a 2014 reissue of the 2005 album The Christmas Collection by Il Divo
- The Classic Christmas Album (Earth, Wind & Fire album), 2015
- The Classic Christmas Album, a 2012 Kenny G compilation
- The Classic Christmas Album, a 2013 George Jones and Tammy Wynette compilation
- The Classic Christmas Album, a 2013 Gladys Knight & the Pips compilation
- The Classic Christmas Album, a 2012 Barry Manilow compilation
- The Classic Christmas Album (Johnny Mathis album), 2014
- The Classic Christmas Album, a 2013 Martina McBride compilation
- The Classic Christmas Album (Sarah McLachlan album), 2015
- The Classic Christmas Album, a 2012 Willie Nelson compilation
- The Classic Christmas Album, a 2012 Elvis Presley compilation
- The Classic Christmas Album, a 2014 Frank Sinatra compilation
- The Classic Christmas Album (Barbra Streisand album), 2013
- The Classic Christmas Album, a 2012 Luther Vandross compilation
- The Classic Christmas Album (Andy Williams album), 2013
- The Classic Christmas Country Album, a 2014 various artists compilation
- The Classic Christmas Hard Rock Album, a 2014 various artists compilation
- The Classic Christmas Pop Album, a 2014 various artists compilation
- The Classic Christmas '80s Album, a 2015 various artists compilation
