= You're Gonna Hear from Me =

You're Gonna Hear from Me may refer to:

- "You're Gonna Hear from Me" (song), a 1965 song from the film Inside Daisy Clover
- You're Gonna Hear from Me (album), a 1988 live album by jazz pianist Bill Evans
