= Merry Christmas (Andy Williams album) =

Studio album by Andy Williams
- Released: October 18, 1965
- Recorded: 1965
- Genre: Christmas; traditional pop; vocal pop; early pop/rock
- Length: 35:37
- Label: Columbia
- Producer: Robert Mersey

Andy Williams chronology
Canadian Sunset (1965)	Merry Christmas (1965)	Andy Williams' Newest Hits (1966)

Merry Christmas is the second Christmas album by American pop singer Andy Williams that was released by Columbia Records in 1965, and his seventeenth studio album overall. This seasonal LP is focused exclusively on 20th century compositions, unlike 1963's The Andy Williams Christmas Album, which, of its 12 tracks, had six with origins predating the turn of the century.

For the six consecutive holiday seasons from 1965 through 1970, Merry Christmas charted on Billboard magazine's special year-end weekly Christmas Albums sales chart. The album spent two weeks as the number one selling Christmas album during the holiday season of 1966 and one week atop that same chart in 1969. it debuted on the Cashbox albums chart in the issue dated December 18, 1965, and remained on the chart for 2 weeks, peaking at number 78 The single from the album, "Do You Hear What I Hear?", reached number 18 on the Christmas Singles chart in 1965.

On May 23, 1968, Merry Christmas was certified Gold by the Recording Industry Association of America for sales of 500,000 copies in the United States. Platinum certification for sales of one million copies followed on November 10, 1989.

== Reception ==
Professional ratings
Review scores
Source	Rating
Allmusic	4.5/5 stars
The Encyclopedia of Popular Music	3/5 stars

Allmusic's Aaron Latham described this holiday outing as "another well-rounded set of traditional favorites that became a perfect companion to The Andy Williams Christmas Album." He found much to praise about this LP. "Williams's dark reading of 'My Favorite Things' from The Sound of Music helped to turn the non-holiday oriented song into a Christmas standard while a delicate 'Some Children See Him' and the joyous 'The Bells of St. Mary's' round out an album that is sung to perfection. Williams would go on to release other holiday collections, but none of them would capture the magical memories created by Merry Christmas and its predecessor. Thanks to good timing, excellent selections, and a voice that makes one feel warm and at home, Andy Williams recorded not just one, but two perennial classics that will be heard for generations to come."

Billboard magazine also appreciated the finished product. "Williams's warmth and style bring freshness to a group of holiday chestnuts." They had their own favorites: "'Let It Snow, Let It Snow, Let It Snow' is given a fine, easy go ballad reading, while the new 'Christmas Holiday' is a bright jazz waltz winner."

== Track listing ==
=== Side one ===
1. "Sleigh Ride" (Leroy Anderson, Mitchell Parish) – 2:11
2. "Have Yourself a Merry Little Christmas" from Meet Me in St. Louis (Ralph Blane, Hugh Martin) – 3:27
3. "Winter Wonderland" (Felix Bernard, Richard B. Smith) – 2:14
4. "My Favorite Things" from The Sound of Music (Oscar Hammerstein II, Richard Rodgers) – 2:29
5. "Let It Snow! Let It Snow! Let It Snow!" (Sammy Cahn, Jule Styne) – 2:20
6. "Christmas Holiday" (Craig Vincent Smith) – 1:56

=== Side two ===
1. "Some Children See Him" (Alfred Burt, Wihla Hutson) – 3:26
2. "Do You Hear What I Hear?" (Gloria Shayne Baker, Noël Regney) – 2:55
3. "Little Altar Boy" (Howlett Peter Smith) – 4:59
4. "Silver Bells" from The Lemon Drop Kid (Ray Evans, Jay Livingston) – 3:12
5. "Mary's Little Boy Child" (Jester Hairston) – 3:57
6. "The Bells of St. Mary's" (A. Emmett Adams, Douglas Furber) – 2:38

== Song information ==
"The Bells of St. Mary's" first charted as a number seven hit for Frances Alda in 1920. The Lombardo Trio provided vocals for Guy Lombardo & His Royal Canadians on their number two hit, "Winter Wonderland", in 1934. Judy Garland reached number 27 with "Have Yourself A Merry Little Christmas" upon the release of the 1944 film Meet Me in St. Louis, in which she performs it. "Let It Snow! Let It Snow! Let It Snow!" by Vaughn Monroe & His Orchestra spent five weeks at number one that began in December 1945. And Arthur Fiedler and the Boston Pops Orchestra took "Sleigh Ride" to number 24 on the Best Selling Pop Singles chart in 1949.

The recording of "Silver Bells" by Bing Crosby and Carol Richards was first released in 1950 but did not chart until 1952. "Some Children See Him" was written in 1951, and its composer's website summarizes its message: "With the U.S. engaged in the Korean War--following so closely after the Second World War with Germany and Japan--the simple but moving lyric of this carol affirmed that children of any nationality could imagine Jesus to be like them, with the underlying message that love is more important than any claim of race or nationality."

"Mary's Little Boy Child" was a number 12 hit for Harry Belafonte in 1956 under the title "Mary's Boy Child". "My Favorite Things" was first performed by Mary Martin and other members of the original Broadway cast of the 1959 musical The Sound of Music. Vic Dana first charted with "Little Altar Boy" in 1961 on the Billboard Hot 100, where he reached number 45, and Bing Crosby reached number two on the Christmas Singles chart in 1963 with "Do You Hear What I Hear?".

"Christmas Holiday" was composed by Craig Vincent Smith, a member of The Good Time Singers folk group that regularly appeared on The Andy Williams Show . Smith also composed "Salesman", recorded by The Monkees for their 1967 album Pisces, Aquarius, Capricorn & Jones Ltd.

== Billboard Christmas Albums chart positions ==
Debut date	Peak position
12/18/65	5
12/3/66	1
12/9/67	20
12/7/68	4
12/6/69	1
12/19/70	19

== Personnel ==
From the liner notes for the original album:

- Andy Williams – vocals
- Robert Mersey - arranger (except as noted), conductor, producer
- Bob Florence - arranger ("Christmas Holiday")
- Glenn Adams - cover photo

== Bibliography ==
- Whitburn, Joel (1986), Joel Whitburn's Pop Memories, 1890-1954, Record Research Inc., ISBN 0-89820-083-0
- Whitburn, Joel (2004), Christmas in the Charts (1920-2004), Record Research Inc., ISBN 0-89820-161-6
