= Christmas (Kenny Rogers album) =

Studio album by Kenny Rogers
- Released: 1981
- Recorded: 1981
- Genre: Seasonal
- Length: 33:37
- Label: Liberty
- Producer: Kenny Rogers

Kenny Rogers chronology
Share Your Love (1981)	Christmas (1981)	Love Will Turn You Around (1982)

Rogers' Christmas chronology
Christmas (1981)	Once Upon a Christmas (1984)

Alternative cover
- 1995 re-release cover titled Christmas Wishes from Kenny Rogers

Christmas is the twelfth studio album and the first Christmas album by Kenny Rogers released in 1981.

== Overview ==
The album features several songs that were already well known at the time including "White Christmas," "When A Child is Born," "Carol of the Bells" and "My Favorite Things." Several original Christmas songs are also included, which have also now become well-known via this album.

Christmas was also the origin of Kenny's first holiday single, "Kentucky Home Made Christmas."

The album peaked at #10 on the U.S. Country charts and #34 on the overall U.S. charts.

== Track listing ==
No.	Title	Writer(s)	Length
1.	"Christmas Everyday"	Peter McCann	3:44
2.	"Kentucky Homemade Christmas"	Bill Caswell, Kin Vassy	4:16
3.	"Carol of the Bells"	Mykola Leontovych, Peter Wilhousky	2:44
4.	"Kids"	Mac Davis	2:44
5.	"Sweet Little Jesus Boy"	Bob MacGimsey	3:04
6.	"Christmas Is My Favorite Time of Year"	Peter McCann	2:44
7.	"White Christmas"	Irving Berlin	2:50
8.	"My Favorite Things"	Oscar Hammerstein II, Richard Rodgers	3:02
9.	"O Holy Night"	Adolphe Adam, John Sullivan Dwight	4:39
10.	"When a Child Is Born"	Fred Jay, Zacar	3:50

== Personnel ==
- Kenny Rogers – lead vocals, backing vocals (3, 6), vocal arrangements
- Gene Page – arrangements
- Barnaby Finch – acoustic piano
- Lincoln Mayorga – acoustic piano
- John Hobbs – keyboards
- Clarence McDonald – Fender Rhodes
- Kin Vassy – acoustic guitar, backing vocals
- Paul Jackson Jr. – guitar
- Ira Newborn – guitar
- David T. Walker – guitar
- Nathan East – bass guitar
- David Hungate – bass guitar
- Jerry Scheff – bass guitar
- Leon "Ndugu" Chancler – drums
- Gary Coleman – percussion
- Paulinho Da Costa – percussion
- Cindy Fee – backing vocals
- Terry Williams – backing vocals
- Jon Joyce – backing vocals (3, 6)
- Maxi Anderson – backing vocals (5)
- Marlena Jeter – backing vocals (5)
- Gwenchie Machu – backing vocals (5)
- Juance Charmaine O’Neal – backing vocals (6)

== Production ==
- Producer – Kenny Rogers
- Assistant Producer – Brenda Harvey-Richie
- Engineers – Reginald Dozier (Tracks 1, 3–6, 8 & 9); Al Schmitt (Tracks 2 & 7); John Arrias (Track 10).
- Second Engineer (Track 10) – Stephen Schmitt
- Mixed by Reggie Dozier
- Art Direction and Design – Bill Burks
- Photography – Tom Gibson and Reid Miles

== Re-releases ==
=== Christmas Wishes from Kenny Rogers ===
The album was reissued in 1995 with an alternate track list along with a title change to Christmas Wishes from Kenny Rogers in some regions (including the United Kingdom and United States). However, in other countries, the title remained Christmas.

==== Alternate track list ====
1. "White Christmas" [2:47]
2. "Carol of the Bells" [2:43]
3. "O Holy Night" [4:38]
4. "Christmas Everyday" [3:42]
5. "Kids" (CD Only) [2:42]
6. "Kentucky Homemade Christmas" [4:14]
7. "Christmas Is My Favorite Time of Year" [2:43]
8. "Sweet Little Jesus Boy" [3:03]
9. "When a Child Is Born" [3:49]
10. "My Favorite Things" (CD Only) [2:59]

== Charts ==
Chart (1981)	Peak position
US Billboard 200	34
US Top Country Albums (Billboard)	10
US Top Holiday Albums (Billboard)	27

== Certifications ==
Region	Certification	Certified units/sales
Canada (Music Canada)	Platinum	100,000^{^}
United States (RIAA)	2× Platinum	2,000,000^{^}
^{^} Shipments figures based on certification alone.
