= The Andy Williams Christmas Album =

- Standard artwork

Studio album by Andy Williams
- Released: October 14, 1963
- Recorded: September 9–13, 1963
- Genres: Christmas; early pop/rock; standards; traditional pop
- Length: 33:29
- Label: Columbia
- Producer: Robert Mersey

Andy Williams chronology
Days of Wine and Roses and Other TV Requests (1963)	The Andy Williams Christmas Album (1963)	The Wonderful World of Andy Williams (1964)

The Andy Williams Christmas Album is the first Christmas holiday album released by singer Andy Williams and his twelfth studio album overall. It was issued by Columbia Records in 1963, the first of eight Christmas albums released by Williams. Though it was also the album that introduced Williams's perennial holiday classic "It's the Most Wonderful Time of the Year", Columbia instead released Williams's cover of "White Christmas" as the album's promotional single at the time.

A front-page story in Billboard magazine on November 23, 1963, made clear that the album was already destined to be a big hit: "Though the majority of retailers around the country that were contacted reported that Christmas product sales were just starting, they have already singled out the new 'Andy Williams Christmas Album' as the probably No. 1 LP for the next two months; at least of those albums thus far on the market. It is already registering heavy sales, as is his single 'White Christmas.'"

From 1963 to 1973, Billboard published special weekly Christmas Albums and Christmas Singles sales charts. For all five weeks that these special charts were published in 1963 (for the weeks ending November 30, through December 28, 1963), The Andy Williams Christmas Album was the top-selling Christmas album, while Williams' cover of "White Christmas" was the number one selling Christmas single. The Andy Williams Christmas Album spent three weeks as the best-selling Christmas album in the holiday season of 1964, and one week as the best-Christmas album in the holiday season of 1965. It charted on Billboard's Christmas Albums chart at least one week for each of the years that the chart was published. In 2018, when separate Christmas rankings were not published in the magazine, the album made its debut on the Billboard 200 chart at number 152, peaking at number 11 in December 2025. it also debuted on the Cashbox albums chart in the issue dated November 23, 1963, and remained on the chart for in a total of 12 weeks, peaking at number seven.

On December 14, 1964, The Andy Williams Christmas Album was certified Gold by the Recording Industry Association of America for sales of 500,000 copies in the United States. The album was reissued with a different cover in the UK in 1975 and was awarded Silver certification by the British Phonographic Industry in 1976 for selling 60,000 units. Platinum certification in the United States was awarded on November 21, 1986.

== Reception ==
Professional ratings
Review scores
Source	Rating
AllMusic	4.5/5 stars
The Encyclopedia of Popular Music	3/5 stars
Record Mirror	4/5 stars

Aaron Latham of AllMusic summed up the release as an "album of wonderful holiday songs perfectly performed" and singled out several noteworthy tracks, describing Williams as "at his playful best on the irresistibly raucous 'Kay Thompson's Jingle Bells.' He also wraps his voice around chestnuts like 'White Christmas' and 'The Christmas Song' with all the warmth of a favorite blanket, while a soaring version of 'O Holy Night' is both enchanting and moving. His tender reading of the lesser-known 'Sweet Little Jesus Boy' is as beautiful and serene as a crystal clear winter's night, but it is the instantly catchy opening line of 'It's the Most Wonderful Time of the Year' that people remember the most."

"Strong arranging, good programming, and the sincerity of Williams' performing" were the high points of the album for Billboard magazine that they mentioned in their capsule review at the time of its release.

Cashbox notes "Williams continues with lyrical and flavorful readings of 'The Christmas Song', 'O Holy Night', and 'The Little Drummer Boy"."

== Track listing ==
Side one is made up of secular Christmas songs, whereas side two covers traditional spirituals and carols.

=== Side one ===
1. "White Christmas" (Irving Berlin) – 2:29
2. "Happy Holiday/The Holiday Season" (Irving Berlin/Kay Thompson) – 2:38
3. "The Christmas Song (Chestnuts Roasting on an Open Fire)" (Mel Tormé, Robert Wells) – 2:34
4. "It's the Most Wonderful Time of the Year" (Edward Pola, George Wyle) – 2:33
5. "A Song and a Christmas Tree (The Twelve Days of Christmas)" (Traditional) – 3:57
6. "Kay Thompson's Jingle Bells" (James Pierpont, Kay Thompson) – 2:06

=== Side two ===
1. "The First Noël" (Traditional) – 3:08
2. "O Holy Night" (Adolphe Adam, John Sullivan Dwight) – 3:24
3. "Away in a Manger" (Traditional) – 2:51
4. "Sweet Little Jesus Boy" (Robert MacGimsey) – 3:17
5. "The Little Drummer Boy" (Katherine K. Davis, Henry Onorati, Harry Simeone) – 2:17
6. "Silent Night, Holy Night" (Franz Xaver Gruber, Joseph Mohr) – 2:15

== “It's the Most Wonderful Time of the Year” ==
In a 2005 interview Williams discusses how The Andy Williams Show figured into his recording of "It's the Most Wonderful Time of the Year": "George Wyle, who's a vocal director, who wrote all of the choir stuff and all of the duets and trios and things that I did with all the guests, he wrote a song just for the show—I think the second Christmas show we did—called "Most Wonderful Time of the Year". So I did that, you know, every Christmas, and then other people started doing it. And then suddenly it's become—not suddenly but over 30 years—it's become a big standard. I think it's one of the top 10 Christmas songs of all time now."

In the issue of Billboard magazine dated November 28, 2009, the list of the "Top 10 Holiday Songs (Since 2001)" places the Williams recording of "It's the Most Wonderful Time of the Year" at number five. 2001 also marks the first year in which the American Society of Composers, Authors and Publishers (also known as ASCAP) started compiling data regarding the radio airplay of holiday songs, and although the Williams classic started out at number 25 of 25 songs that were ranked that year, it gained steam over the next 10 years, reaching number 18 in 2002, number 13 in 2003, and eventually getting to number four in 2010.

In December 2017, Williams' original version of the song entered the Top 40 of the Billboard Hot 100 for the first time, and peaked at #34.

== Personnel ==
From the liner notes for the original album:

- Andy Williams – vocals
- Robert Mersey – arranger (except as noted), conductor, producer
- Marty Paich – arranger ("Happy Holiday/The Holiday Season")
- Johnny Mandel – arranger ("It's the Most Wonderful Time of the Year", "Kay Thompson's Jingle Bells")
- George Wyle – arranger ("A Song and a Christmas Tree (The Twelve Days of Christmas)", "Silent Night, Holy Night")

== Charts ==
Chart performance for The Andy Williams Christmas Album (1963)
Chart (1963)	Peak position
US Christmas Albums (Billboard)	1

Chart performance (1964)
Chart (1964)	Peak position
US Christmas Albums (Billboard)	1

Chart performance (1965)
Chart (1965)	Peak position
US Christmas Albums (Billboard)	1

Chart performance (1966)
Chart (1966)	Peak position
US Christmas Albums (Billboard)	60

Chart performance (1967)
Chart (1967)	Peak position
US Christmas Albums (Billboard)	6

Chart performance (1968)
Chart (1968)	Peak position
US Christmas Albums (Billboard)	17

Chart performance (1968)
Chart (1969)	Peak position
US Christmas Albums (Billboard)	30

Chart performance (1970)
Chart (1970)	Peak position
US Christmas Albums (Billboard)	4

Chart performance (1971)
Chart (1971)	Peak position
US Christmas Albums (Billboard)	4

Chart performance (1972)
Chart (1972)	Peak position
US Christmas Albums (Billboard)	8

Chart performance (1973)
Chart (1973)	Peak position
US Christmas Albums (Billboard)	6

Chart performance (2012)
Chart (2012)	Peak position
US Holiday Albums (Billboard)	5

Chart performance (2018)
Chart (2018)	Peak position
US Holiday Albums (Billboard)	19
US Billboard 200	63

Chart performance (2019)
Chart (2019)	Peak position
US Holiday Albums (Billboard)	18
US Billboard 200	40

Chart performance (2020)
Chart (2020)	Peak position
Canadian Albums (Billboard)	26
Danish Albums (Hitlisten)	38
US Holiday Albums (Billboard)	9
US Billboard 200	68

Chart performance (2021)
Chart (2021)	Peak position
Canadian Albums (Billboard)	15
US Holiday Albums (Billboard)	6
US Billboard 200	14

Chart performance (2022)
Chart (2022)	Peak position
Canadian Albums (Billboard)	14
Danish Albums (Hitlisten)	26
Finnish Albums (Suomen virallinen lista)	47
Lithuanian Albums (AGATA)	25
US Holiday Albums (Billboard)	8
US Billboard 200	14

Chart performance (2023)
Chart (2023)	Peak position
Canadian Albums (Billboard)	26
Danish Albums (Hitlisten)	23
Hungarian Albums (MAHASZ)	18
Icelandic Albums (Tónlistinn)	30
Lithuanian Albums (AGATA)	11
Norwegian Albums (VG-lista)	34
Polish Albums (ZPAV)	77
Swedish Albums (Sverigetopplistan)	22
US Holiday Albums (Billboard)	8
US Billboard 200	15

Chart performance (2024)
Chart (2024)	Peak position
Canadian Albums (Billboard)	10
Danish Albums (Hitlisten)	21
Finnish Albums (Suomen virallinen lista)	41
Hungarian Albums (MAHASZ)	18
Icelandic Albums (Tónlistinn)	33
Lithuanian Albums (AGATA)	13
Norwegian Albums (VG-lista)	27
Polish Albums (ZPAV)	51
Swedish Albums (Sverigetopplistan)	15
US Holiday Albums (Billboard)	9
US Billboard 200	17

Chart performance (2025)
Chart (2025)	Peak position
Canadian Albums (Billboard)	19
Danish Albums (Hitlisten)	30
German Pop Albums (Offizielle Top 100)	15
Icelandic Albums (Tónlistinn)	34
Lithuanian Albums (AGATA)	20
Norwegian Albums (VG-lista)	42
Swedish Albums (Sverigetopplistan)	23
US Holiday Albums (Billboard)	9
US Billboard 200	11

== Bibliography ==
- Clancy, Ronald (2006), Best-Loved Christmas Carols: The Stories Behind Twenty-Five Yuletide Favorites, Sterling Publishing Co., Inc., ISBN 1-4027-4187-1
- Hill, Richard S. (December 1945). "Not So Far Away in a Manger: Forty-One Settings of an American Carol". Notes: Quarterly Journal of the Music Library Association. III (1). Music Library Association: 20.
- Nobmann, Dale (1999), Christmas Music Companion Fact Book: The Chronological History of Our Most Well-Known Traditional Christmas Hymns, Carols and Songs As Well As the Writers & Composers Who Create Them, Perigree Books, ISBN 0-399-52477-0
- Simon, William L., ed. (1981), Merry Christmas Songbook, The Reader's Digest Association, Inc., ISBN 0-89577-105-5
- Whitburn, Joel (2004), Christmas in the Charts (1920-2004), Record Research Inc., ISBN 0-89820-161-6
