= Jim Nabors' Christmas Album =

Studio album by Jim Nabors
- Released: October 1967
- Recorded: July 22, 1967
- Genre: Christmas
- Length: 35:01
- Labels: Columbia; CL-2731; CS-9531
- Producer: Jack Gold

Jim Nabors chronology
The Things I Love (1967)	Jim Nabors' Christmas Album (1967)	Kiss Me Goodbye (1968)

Singles from Jim Nabors' Christmas Album
- 1. "White Christmas" Released: November 6, 1967

Jim Nabors' Christmas Album is a Christmas-themed studio album by American singer and actor Jim Nabors released in late 1967 by Columbia Records. The album mainly included traditional Christmas standards and carols. It received positive reviews upon its release and appeared on the charts published by Billboard in five consecutive years, from 1967 to 1971, reaching No. 1 in 1969.

== Background, recording, and content ==
Jim Nabors had been recording for Columbia since the mid-1960s, releasing several hit albums. He was known as being an easy-listening ballad singer. In 1967, he cut a Christmas album, which was common for popular vocalists at the time. Jim Nabors' Christmas Album consisted of 12 tracks in total, which included seasonal hits and traditional hymns. The hits included songs that made the Billboard pop charts such as "White Christmas", "Do You Hear What I Hear?", and "Sleigh Ride". "Go Tell It on the Mountain" was the only traditional song, while there were two more traditional carols, including "O Come, All Ye Faithful" and "Silent Night." Three new songs were recorded as well: "Christmas Eve in My Hometown", "In a Humble Place", and "Three Wise Men, Wise Men Three". Like his previous releases, the album was produced by Jack Gold with arrangements by Alan Copeland. It was recorded in the summer on July 22, 1967.

== Release and critical reception ==
The album was released in October 1967. Columbia offered it as a vinyl LP, available in stereo and mono sound, but by 1969 only stereo pressings were available. Billboard stated that "Jim Nabors' homespun quality is a natural for the Christmas mood," but "more importantly, he's got the voice to carry the carols and the ballads into the winner's circle, too." Cashbox magazine stated that a "good, happy Christmas seems to be the theme of this shiny new set from Jim Nabors," believing: "Looks like plenty of seasonal spins for this one." The Santa Barbara News-Press told Nabors fans to "give it a listen," noting that it "makes you want to go back to grandma's for a good, old-fashioned, snow-on-the-ground and candles-on-the-tree kind of Christmas. Calling it an "easy-listening treat," David A. Milberg of AllMusic stated that "it includes one of the best versions of 'White Christmas' ever."

== Chart performance and singles ==
Jim Nabors' Christmas Album successfully reached the US Christmas LP's chart published by Billboard magazine on several years, omitted from their usual Billboard Top LP's chart due to their policy regarding holiday albums. It debuted in the issue dated December 2, 1967, peaking at No. 7 during a five-week run. One lead single was released from the album in November 1967: "White Christmas". In 1968, the album again made an appearance on it at No. 7, but in 1969, two days after Christmas it topped the chart at No. 1. It made the chart another time in 1970, at No. 3. In 1971, it re-charted for a final time at No. 9.

== Track listing ==
Side one
No.	Title	Writer(s)	Length
1.	"Go Tell It on the Mountain"	Traditional	2:58
2.	"Do You Hear What I Hear?"	Noël Regney; Gloria Shayne Baker	3:32
3.	"Three Wise Men, Wise Men Three"	Gloria Shayne Baker; Noël Regney	2:41
4.	"O Holy Night"	Placide Cappeau; Adolphe Adam	4:05
5.	"In a Humble Place"	Gloria Shayne Baker	2:49
6.	"O Come, All Ye Faithful"	John Francis Wade	2:33
Total length:			18:38

Side two
No.	Title	Writer(s)	Length
1.	"Jingle Bells"	James Lord Pierpont	2:21
2.	"White Christmas"	Irving Berlin	2:52
3.	"Christmas Eve in My Hometown"	Don Upton; Stan Zabka	2:47
4.	"Sleigh Ride"	Leroy Anderson; Mitchell Parish	2:44
5.	"I'll Be Home for Christmas"	Buck Ram; Kim Gannon; Walter Kent	2:50
6.	"Silent Night"	Joseph Mohr; Franz Xaver Gruber	2:49
Total length:			16:23

== Charts ==
Chart peaks for Jim Nabors' Christmas Album
Chart (1967)	Peak position
US Billboard Christmas LP's	7
Chart (1968)	Peak position
US Billboard Christmas LP's	7
Chart (1969)	Peak position
US Billboard Christmas LP's	1
Chart (1970)	Peak position
US Billboard Christmas LP's	3
Chart (1971)	Peak position
US Billboard Christmas LP's	9

== Personnel ==
All credits are adapted from the liner notes of Jim Nabors' Christmas Album.

- Jim Nabors – lead vocals
- Alan Copeland – arranger, conductor
- Frank Bez – photography
- Jack Gold – producer
- Tom May – engineer
