= Holiday Sing Along with Mitch =

Studio album by Mitch Miller and The Gang
- Released: 1961
- Genre: Easy listening, Christmas music
- Label: Columbia

Mitch Miller and The Gang chronology
Your Request Sing Along with Mitch (1961)	Holiday Sing Along with Mitch (1961)	Rhythm Sing Along with Mitch (1962)

Holiday Sing Along with Mitch is an album by Mitch Miller and The Gang. It was released in 1961 on the Columbia label (catalog nos. CL-1701 and CS-8501). This album consisted of more contemporary Christmas songs, while his Miller's previous Christmas album, Christmas Sing Along with Mitch, consisted of more traditional carols, a few of them of a religious character.

The album debuted on Billboard magazine's popular albums chart on December 4, 1961, reached the No. 1 spot, and remained on the chart for 13 weeks. It returned to the popular albums chart in 1962 and made Billboard's special holiday chart in 1963, 1964, 1965, 1966, 1967, and 1968. It was certified as a gold record by the RIAA.

AllMusic later gave the album a rating of four-and-a-half stars. Reviewer Stephen Thomas Erlewine wrote: "There are no surprises here -- Miller's records are all essentially the same; the only things that change are the songs -- but anyone who enjoys his sound should find this holiday album worth adding to their collection."

This album, like many of Mitch Miller's records, had a strict, metronomic rhythm-- every syllable was sung precisely on the beat. This is partly due to the tear-out lyric sheets found in his albums-- you were expected to 'sing along with Mitch.' The rhythm was to help you keep your place.

== Track listing ==
Side 1

1. "Santa Claus Is Coming to Town"
2. "Frosty the Snowman"
3. "I Saw Mommy Kissing Santa Claus"
4. "Sleigh Ride"
5. "Must Be Santa"
6. "The Christmas Song (Merry Christmas to You)"

Side 2

1. "Rudolph, the Red-Nosed Reindeer"
2. "The Twelve Days of Christmas"
3. "Winter Wonderland"
4. "Let It Snow! Let It Snow! Let It Snow!"
5. "Silver Bells"
6. "Jingle Bells"
7. "White Christmas"
