= Once Upon a Christmas (Kenny Rogers and Dolly Parton album) =

Studio album by Kenny Rogers and Dolly Parton
- Released: October 29, 1984
- Recorded: August 1984
- Studios: Lion Share Studios (Los Angeles); Sunset Sound (Hollywood); Evergreen Studios (Nashville); Caecca Sound (Dallas); Lighthouse Recorders (Los Angeles)
- Genres: Christmas; country
- Length: 35:25
- Label: RCA Victor
- Producers: David Foster; Kenny Rogers

Kenny Rogers chronology
What About Me? (1984)	Once Upon a Christmas (1984)	Duets (1984)

Dolly Parton chronology
Rhinestone (1984)	Once Upon a Christmas (1984)	Real Love (1985)

Rogers' Christmas chronology
Christmas (1981)	Once Upon a Christmas (1984)	Christmas in America (1989)

Parton's Christmas chronology
Once Upon a Christmas (1984)	Home for Christmas (1990)

Singles from Once Upon a Christmas
- 1. "The Greatest Gift of All" Released: November 26, 1984; 2. "Medley: Winter Wonderland / Sleigh Ride" Released: November 26, 1984; 3. "The Christmas Song" Released: November 26, 1984; 4. "Christmas Without You" Released: November 25, 1985; 5. "I Believe in Santa Claus" Released: November 23, 1987

Once Upon a Christmas is a collaborative studio album by Kenny Rogers and Dolly Parton. It was released on October 29, 1984, by RCA Records. The album was produced by Rogers with David Foster. It was Rogers' second Christmas album, following 1981's Christmas, and Parton's first. The album's release was accompanied by a CBS television special, Kenny & Dolly: A Christmas to Remember. The album was certified 2× Platinum by the RIAA in 1989.

== Background ==
Rogers and Parton first worked together in 1976 when Rogers was a guest on Parton's syndicated variety series, Dolly. The pair joined forces again on Rogers' 1983 single, "Islands in the Stream", which was a number one hit. Rogers contacted Parton in late 1983 to see if she would be interested in doing a Christmas album with him. Due to the pair's busy schedules, recording did not take place until August 1984. According to an article in Billboard, the album was completed and mixing had taken place by late September.

In an issue of Cashbox, Rogers said of the album, "I was raised in a Baptist family and I've always thought of Christmas as a special time, a time when families who might be apart the rest of the year can come close together again. Something special also happens when Dolly and I get together: it's a case of the whole being even greater than the sum of its parts." Parton said, "This is the first Christmas special or album that I've ever done, so when Kenny called me with the idea, I jumped at it. Kenny and I love singing together; I think the blend of our voices creates a real electricity that comes across on record. He also has a real Santa Claus spirit. He makes working fun, and approaches things like I do, enjoying the people around him."

== Release and promotion ==
The album was released October 29, 1984 on LP, CD, and cassette.

Rogers and Parton promoted the album's release with a television special titled Kenny & Dolly: A Christmas to Remember, which aired December 2, 1984 on CBS. The Bob Giraldi directed special featured performances of all ten songs from the album. These range from a performance with Rogers and Parton as Santa Claus and Mrs. Claus to a performance at a USO party in World War II London to a rousing finale in a down-home country church. The television special was viewed by 30 million people. Following the special, a video excerpt of the "Christmas Without You" performance was serviced to television stations.

Three singles were issued simultaneously in November 1984: "The Greatest Gift of All" (a duet), "Medley: Winter Wonderland/Sleigh Ride" (a Dolly Parton solo), and "The Christmas Song" (a Kenny Rogers solo). "The Greatest Gift of All" peaked at number 40 on the Billboard Adult Contemporary chart. It also peaked at number 53 on the Hot Country Singles chart and number 81 on the Billboard Hot 100. The Parton solo, "Medley: Winter Wonderland/Sleigh Ride", did not chart during its initial release, but peaked at number 70 on the Billboard Hot Country Songs chart in January 1999. Rogers' solo, "The Christmas Song", failed to chart.

"Christmas Without You" was issued as a single in Europe in November 1984 and peaked at number 88 on the UK Singles Chart. It would be issued as a single in the United States in November 1985, but failed to chart.

A fifth single, "I Believe in Santa Claus", was issued in the United States in November 1987 and also failed to chart.

== Critical reception ==
Professional ratings
Review scores
Source	Rating
The Encyclopedia of Popular Music	3/5 stars

In a positive review, Billboard said the album "shows signs of emerging as a seasonal blockbuster." The review called Parton's compositions "lively" and said that the album is "devoid of schmaltz" and "sparkles with warmth."

== Accolades ==
The album received the Canadian Country Music Association Award for Top Selling Album in 1985.

Year	Nominee / work	Award	Result
1985	Once Upon a Christmas	Top Selling Album	Won

== Commercial performance ==
The album debuted at number 19 on the Billboard Top Country Albums chart dated December 15, 1984. It peaked at number 12 on the chart dated January 12, 1985. The album has spent a total of 35 weeks on the chart as of December 2019. The album also peaked at number 31 on both the Billboard 200 and the Canadian Albums Chart. The album also saw success in European countries, peaking at number 33 on the Norwegian Albums chart, number 37 on the Dutch Albums chart, and number 40 on the Swedish Albums chart.

The album received Gold and Platinum certifications from the RIAA on December 3, 1984, and was certified 2× Platinum on October 25, 1989, for shipment of 2 million copies. The album received Gold and Platinum certifications from Music Canada on December 1, 1984. The album was certified 3× Platinum on November 14, 1985, and 4× Platinum on January 21, 1987. It was certified 5× Platinum on April 13, 1988, for shipments of 500,000 copies.

== Reissues ==
In 1997, the album was reissued on the BMG Special Products label with an altered track listing. The song order was slightly rearranged and Rogers' two solos were omitted ("The Christmas Song" and "Silent Night"). However, Parton's 1982 recording of "Hard Candy Christmas" from The Best Little Whorehouse in Texas was added.

== Track listing ==
Once Upon a Christmas track listing
No.	Title	Writer(s)	Length
1.	"I Believe in Santa Claus"	Dolly Parton	3:30
2.	"Medley: Winter Wonderland/Sleigh Ride" (Dolly Parton solo)	Dick Smith; Felix Bernard; Mitchel Parish; Leroy Anderson	3:43
3.	"Christmas Without You"	Parton; Steve Goldstein	3:55
4.	"The Christmas Song" (Kenny Rogers solo)	Mel Tormé; Robert Wells	3:23
5.	"A Christmas to Remember"	Parton	3:41
6.	"With Bells On"	Parton	2:42
7.	"Silent Night" (Kenny Rogers solo)	Joseph Mohr; Franz Gruber	3:18
8.	"The Greatest Gift of All"	John Jarvis	3:46
9.	"White Christmas" (Dolly Parton solo)	Irving Berlin	3:06
10.	"Once Upon a Christmas"	Parton	4:21
Total length:			35:25

1997 reissue track listing
No.	Title	Writer(s)	Length
1.	"I Believe in Santa Claus"	Parton	3:30
2.	"Medley: Winter Wonderland/Sleigh Ride" (Dolly Parton solo)	Smith; Bernard; Parish; Anderson	3:43
3.	"With Bells On"	Parton	2:42
4.	"Christmas Without You"	Parton; Goldstein	3:55
5.	"White Christmas" (Dolly Parton solo)	Berlin	3:06
6.	"A Christmas to Remember"	Parton	3:41
7.	"Hard Candy Christmas" (Dolly Parton solo)	Carol Hall	3:39
8.	"The Greatest Gift of All"	Jarvis	3:46
9.	"Once Upon a Christmas"	Parton	4:21
Total length:			32:23

== Personnel ==
Adapted from the album liner notes.

Performance

- Dolly Parton – vocals
- Kenny Rogers – vocals
- Erich Bulling – keyboards, synthesizer programming
- Jimmy Cox – keyboards
- David Foster – keyboards, rhythm arrangements
- John Hobbs – keyboards
- Randy Waldman – keyboards
- John Goux – guitars
- Paul Jackson Jr. – guitars
- Michael Landau – guitars
- Fred Tackett – guitars
- Kin Vassy – guitars
- Billy Joe Walker Jr. – guitars
- Dennis Belfield – bass
- Joe Chemay – bass
- Neil Stubenhaus – bass
- Ed Greene – drums
- Paul Leim – drums, percussion
- John Robinson – drums
- Victor Feldman – percussion
- Jeremy Lubbock – string arrangements, rhythm arrangements

Production

- David Foster – producer
- Kenny Rogers – producer
- Debbie Caponetta – production assistant
- Humberto Gatica – engineer, mixing
- Tommy Vicari – engineer
- Terry Christian – additional engineer
- Larry Fergusson – additional engineer
- Tom Fouce – additional engineer
- Stuart Furusho – additional engineer
- David Leonard – additional engineer
- Laura Livingston – additional engineer
- Bob Pickering – additional engineer
- John Richards – additional engineer
- Stephen Schmitt – additional engineer
- Stephen Shelton – additional engineer
- Wally Traugott – mastering

Other personnel

- Sandy Gallin – management for Dolly Parton
- Tzetzi Ganev – Dolly Parton's costume
- John Coulter Design – art direction
- Ken Kragen for Kragen & Company – management for Kenny Rogers
- Reid Miles – front and back cover photography
- Dianne Roberson – Dolly Parton's hair
- Cassie Seaver – Dolly Parton's makeup
- Diana Thomas – creative consultant for Dolly Parton
- Gene Trindl for CBS Photography – inner sleeve photography

== Charts ==
=== Weekly charts ===
Chart (1984)	Peak position
Canadian Albums (Billboard)	31
Dutch Albums (Album Top 100)	37
Norwegian Albums (VG-lista)	33
Swedish Albums (Sverigetopplistan)	40
US Billboard 200	31
US Top Country Albums (Billboard)	12
US Cashbox Country Albums	12
US Cash Box Top Albums	36

=== Year-end charts ===
Chart (2001)	Position
Canadian Country Albums (Nielsen SoundScan)	41

Chart (2002)	Position
Canadian Country Albums (Nielsen SoundScan)	43

Chart (2018)	Position
US Top Country Albums (Billboard)	89

Chart (2020)	Position
US Top Country Albums (Billboard)	98

Chart (2021)	Position
US Top Country Albums (Billboard)	99

== Certifications ==
Region	Certification	Certified units/sales
Canada (Music Canada)	5× Platinum	500,000^{^}
Norway (IFPI Norway)	4× Platinum	80,000^{‡}
United States (RIAA)	2× Platinum	2,000,000^{^}
^{^} Shipments figures based on certification alone.^{‡} Sales+streaming figures based on certification alone.
