= Harry Simeone =

American music arranger, conductor and composer (1911–2005)

- Born: May 9, 1911; Newark, New Jersey, U.S.
- Died: February 22, 2005 (aged 93) New York, New York, U.S.
- Occupations: Music arranger; conductor; composer
- Spouse: Margaret McCravy (died 2001)

Harry Simeone (May 9, 1911 – February 22, 2005) was an American music arranger, conductor, and composer. He spent much of his career working in film and television, but he is best remembered for directing the Harry Simeone Chorale, which popularized the Christmas song "The Little Drummer Boy" in 1958.

== Early years ==
Harry Moses Simeone was born in Newark, New Jersey on May 9, 1911. He grew up listening to stars performing at the Metropolitan Opera, just across the river in New York City. Initiated and inspired by this childhood passion, he sought a career as a concert pianist. Simeone attended the Juilliard School of Music for three years, but dropped out to accept a job as an arranger at CBS. This brought him to the attention of bandleader Fred Waring, who hired him as an arranger and conductor. During this time he married Margaret McCravy, who was one of Fred Waring's singers, and who had previously sung with Benny Goodman's orchestra under the name Margaret McCrae.

== Initial prominence ==
After garnering vocal and music arrangement credits for the 1938 RKO motion picture Radio City Revels, Simeone relocated to Hollywood. There he had various music production jobs for several Paramount films between 1939 and 1946, including some that starred Bing Crosby. He began a second stint with Fred Waring in 1945. In 1948, Simeone joined NBC's The Swift Show as the program's orchestra leader, and from 1952 to 1959 he served as conductor and choral arranger for NBC's The Firestone Hour.

== "The Little Drummer Boy" ==
When 20th Century Fox Records contracted Simeone to make a Christmas album in 1958, he assembled a group he called "The Harry Simeone Chorale" and searched for recording material. After being introduced to an obscure song titled "Carol of the Drum" by producer and credited song co-author Henry Onorati (originally composed by Katherine Kennicott Davis in 1941 and arranged to present form by Jack Halloran), Simeone changed the title to "The Little Drummer Boy" and recorded it for his album Sing We Now of Christmas. He received joint authorship-and-composition credit for the song, although he did not actually write it. "The Little Drummer Boy" was issued as a single and quickly became extremely popular, appearing on the U.S. music charts annually from 1958 to 1962.

In 1964, Simeone signed with Kapp Records. The following year he recorded a new version of "The Little Drummer Boy" for his album O Bambino – The Little Drummer Boy. Unlike the earlier recording, this version was in stereo.

== Other recordings ==
Simeone organized another group in 1960 called The Harry Simeone Songsters, whose style he made similar to that of the Ray Conniff Singers. Under his direction, that group produced a baseball-oriented song called "It's a Beautiful Day for a Ball Game", which many major-league teams played at their ballparks or used to open their radio/TV broadcasts. The song is on one of the Baseball's Greatest Hits CDs.

The Harry Simeone Chorale had another Christmas success in 1962 with their rendition of the then-new song "Do You Hear What I Hear?" for Mercury Records.

== Final years ==
On May 22, 2000, Simeone and his wife, by then living on the Upper East Side of New York City, officially established the Harry and Margaret Simeone Music Scholarship at Yale University by bestowing a gift of one million dollars.

His wife Margaret died the following year, after which Harry's health declined. He died on February 22, 2005, at the age of 93, at Beth Israel Medical Center in Manhattan.

Simeone's granddaughter Laura Stevenson also became a musician, becoming the frontwoman of Laura Stevenson and the Cans.

== See also ==
- List of arrangers
