= A Christmas Album (Barbra Streisand album) =

Studio album by Barbra Streisand
- Released: October 16, 1967 (LP and cassette); October 30, 1984 (CD)
- Recorded: June 26, 1966 at Olympic Sound Studios in London; 9–16 September 1967 in Los Angeles, California
- Genre: Pop, Christmas
- Length: 33:40
- Label: Columbia
- Producer: Jack Gold, Ettore Stratta

Barbra Streisand chronology
Simply Streisand (1967)	A Christmas Album (1967)	Funny Girl (soundtrack) (1968)

A Christmas Album (1967) is the first Christmas album and the tenth studio album released by American singer Barbra Streisand.

== Background and release ==
The album is one of Streisand's best-selling albums and is ranked as one of the best-selling Christmas albums of all time. The cover photograph of the album was taken on June 16, 1967, during the rehearsal for her concert, A Happening in Central Park. The album is also Streisand's last album to use Columbia's "Stereo 360 sound" banner, and the last to be issued originally in monaural and stereo. Most copies of the LP edition seen today are stereophonic.

Many of the tracks from this album were re-issued in 1970 as Side 1 of a compilation album titled Season's Greetings from Barbra Streisand...and Friends, pieced together by Maxwell House Coffee and Columbia Special Products. (Side 2 of the compilation featured various tracks from Streisand's Columbia labelmates Doris Day, Jim Nabors, and Andre Kostelanetz.) Streisand also recorded an alternate, English-language version of "Gounod's Ave Maria" during sessions for the album in 1966. This track remained unreleased until 2005 when it was licensed to a Starbucks Christmas compilation CD titled Baby, It's Cold Outside.

The album was released on CD in November 1989. It was remastered and reissued once again in October 2004 for the Columbia Records "Essential Holiday Classics" series. The album was yet again reissued in October 2007 to commemorate the album's 40th anniversary.

== Singles ==
- "Sleep in Heavenly Peace (Silent Night)" / "Gounod's Ave Maria" 1967
- "Jingle Bells?" / "Have Yourself a Merry Little Christmas" 1967
- "My Favorite Things" / "The Christmas Song" 1967
- "The Lord's Prayer" / "I Wonder As I Wander" 1967

== Critical reception ==
Professional ratings
Review scores
Source	Rating
Allmusic	4.5/5 stars

Reviewing the album for AllMusic, William Ruhlman gave it a retrospective four and a half (out of five) stars and called it "a timeless classic", stating that "If Simply Streisand ... indicated that Streisand was overly reverent when it came to standards, reverence was no problem with seasonal fare."

== Commercial performance ==
On Billboard magazine's special year-end weekly Christmas Albums chart, A Christmas Album spent all five weeks that the chart was published in late 1967 at No. 1, making it the best-selling holiday album of 1967 in the U.S. The album charted for the first time on Billboard's weekly Billboard 200 album sales chart in December 1981, peaking at position No. 108 during a five-week chart run. On May 5, 1999, A Christmas Album was certified Quintuple Platinum by the Recording Industry Association of America for shipments of five million copies in the United States.

For the week ending November 24, 2012, the album re-entered the Billboard 200 chart at No. 195 and climbed to No. 183 the following week. It also reached No. 38 on the Billboard Top Pop Catalog Albums chart.

== Track listing ==
=== Side one ===
No.	Title	Writer(s)	Length
1.	"Jingle Bells?"	James Lord Pierpont; New adaptation by Jack Gold and Marty Paich	1:58
2.	"Have Yourself a Merry Little Christmas"	Ralph Blane, Hugh Martin	3:14
3.	"The Christmas Song (Chestnuts Roasting on an Open Fire)"	Mel Tormé, Bob Wells	4:00
4.	"White Christmas"	Irving Berlin	3:08
5.	"My Favorite Things"	Oscar Hammerstein II, Richard Rodgers	3:09
6.	"The Best Gift"	Lan O'Kun	3:11

=== Side two ===
No.	Title	Writer(s)	Length
1.	"Sleep in Heavenly Peace (Silent Night)"	Franz Gruber, Josef Mohr	3:07
2.	"Gounod's Ave Maria" (Latin Version)	Charles Gounod	3:26
3.	"O Little Town of Bethlehem"	Phillips Brooks, Lewis Redner; New adaptation by Jack Gold	2:58
4.	"I Wonder as I Wander"	John Jacob Niles	3:18
5.	"The Lord's Prayer"	Albert Hay Malotte	2:43

== Personnel ==
- Barbra Streisand – singer
- Marty Paich – arranger, conductor (Tracks 1–5)
- Ray Ellis – arranger, conductor (*) (Tracks 7, 8, 10, 11)
- Jack Gold – producer
- Raphael Valentin – recording engineer
- Jack Lattig – recording engineer
- Don Meehan – mixing engineer
- Steve Horn / Norm Griner – cover photography

== Certifications ==
Region	Certification	Certified units/sales
Australia (ARIA)	Gold	35,000^{‡}
United States (RIAA)	5× Platinum	5,000,000^{^}
^{^} Shipments figures based on certification alone.^{‡} Sales+streaming figures based on certification alone.
