= Christmas Isn't Canceled (Just You) =

Single by Kelly Clarkson

from the album When Christmas Comes Around...
- Released: September 23, 2021
- Recorded: 2021
- Studio: Glenwood Place Studios (Burbank, CA); The Listening Station (Pasadena, CA); The Vibe Room (Universal City, CA)
- Genre: Pop
- Length: 3:51
- Label: Atlantic
- Songwriters: Kelly Clarkson; Jessi Collins; Jason Halbert
- Producers: Jason Halbert; Joseph Trapanese

Kelly Clarkson singles chronology
"I Would've Loved You" (2021)	"Christmas Isn't Canceled (Just You)" (2021)	"9 to 5" (2022)

"Christmas Isn't Canceled (Just You)" is a song by American singer Kelly Clarkson from her ninth studio album and second Christmas album, When Christmas Comes Around... (2021). Produced by Jason Halbert and Joseph Trapanese, it was released as album's lead single by Atlantic Records on September 23, 2021.

== Background and release ==
Following the release of her sixth studio album and first Christmas album Wrapped in Red in 2013, Clarkson continued to release the holiday songs "Christmas Eve", "Under the Mistletoe" (with Brett Eldredge, and covers of Sarah McLachlan's "Wintersong" and Vince Vance & The Valiants' "All I Want for Christmas Is You".

"Christmas Isn't Canceled (Just You)" was issued by Atlantic Records on September 23, 2021, as the lead single from her ninth studio album and second Christmas album. On September 17, 2021, she shared a preview of the song's lyrical content on her social media accounts. "Christmas Isn't Canceled" was written by Clarkson with Jessi Collins and Jason Halbert, who co-produced the track with Joseph Trapanese. Its lyrical inspiration came in part from Clarkson's divorce from Brandon Blackstock, which came in the midst of (and partially influenced by) the COVID-19 pandemic that had led to widespread cancellations of Christmas celebrations in 2020.

== Charts ==
=== Weekly charts ===
Weekly chart performance for "Christmas Isn't Canceled (Just You)"
Chart (2021)	Peak position
Canada Digital Song Sales (Billboard)	50
Canada AC (Billboard)	17
Canada Hot AC (Billboard)	26
New Zealand Hot Singles (RMNZ)	40
US Billboard Hot 100	79
US Adult Contemporary (Billboard)	3
US Holiday 100 (Billboard)	64

=== Year-end charts ===
2022 year-end chart performance for "Christmas Isn't Canceled (Over You)"
Chart (2022)	Position
US Adult Contemporary (Billboard)	34

== Release history ==
List of release dates, showing region, release format, catalog, and label
Region	Date	Format	Label	Catalog No.	Ref.
Various	September 23, 2021	Digital download; streaming	Atlantic	USAT22106041	
Italy	November 29, 2024	Radio airplay	Warner		
