= Bomb Iran =

Several parodies of 1961 song Barbara Ann

"Bomb Iran" (or "Bomb, Bomb, Bomb, Bomb, Bomb Iran") is the name of several parodies of the Regents' 1961 song "Barbara Ann", originally written by Fred Fassert and popularized in a "party" cover version by the Beach Boys in 1965. The most popular of the parodies was recorded by Vince Vance & the Valiants in 1980. "Bomb Iran" gained a resurgence in notoriety in 2007 during John McCain's 2008 presidential campaign, as well as during the 2025 US strikes on Iranian nuclear sites and the 2026 Iran war.

== Origins ==
In reaction to the Iran hostage crisis which began in November 1979, the first publicly known version of this parody was recorded by a group called "the Baritone Dwarfs" and aired on the radio in Boston in December 1979.

A second version, with different lyrics, aired on KIXS-FM (now KGSR) in Killeen, Texas (which broadcasts to the military institution Fort Hood) for a single weekend in January 1980. At least five more "Bomb Iran" songs were written and copyrighted in 1980. The lyrics have the line "Went to a mosque, gonna throw some rocks...Tell the Ayatollah...'Gonna put you in a box!'", referring to Ayatollah Ruhollah Khomeini. Khomeini would die of natural causes in 1989, but his successor, Ali Khamenei would be assassinated by airstrike in 2026.

In addition to these parodies, another version of "Bomb Iran" was written by radio personalities Dana Michaels and Tom Rivers. This version of the song was produced by Rivers and performed by Michaels (guitar and vocals), Ernie Norris (guitar and vocals), John Rode (guitar and vocals), Mark Lewis (vocals), and Tony Blake (vocals), who called themselves the "Not Current in This Time Zone Singers". It was first aired on KFQD Radio (where Rivers was program director) in Anchorage, Alaska on April 25, 1980, immediately after an attempt to rescue the American hostages in Tehran failed. Rivers later wrote in Billboard Magazine, "the phones lit up like a Christmas tree. We logged more than 20,000 calls in three days...and they were 97 percent positive." Because of the song's popularity in Australia and New Zealand, EMI Records called Rivers to discuss a possible recording contract and tour.

Another version of "Bomb Iran" was recorded in 1980 by a group called "J.C. & the B-1 Bombers".

== Vince Vance & the Valiants ==
"Bomb Iran"
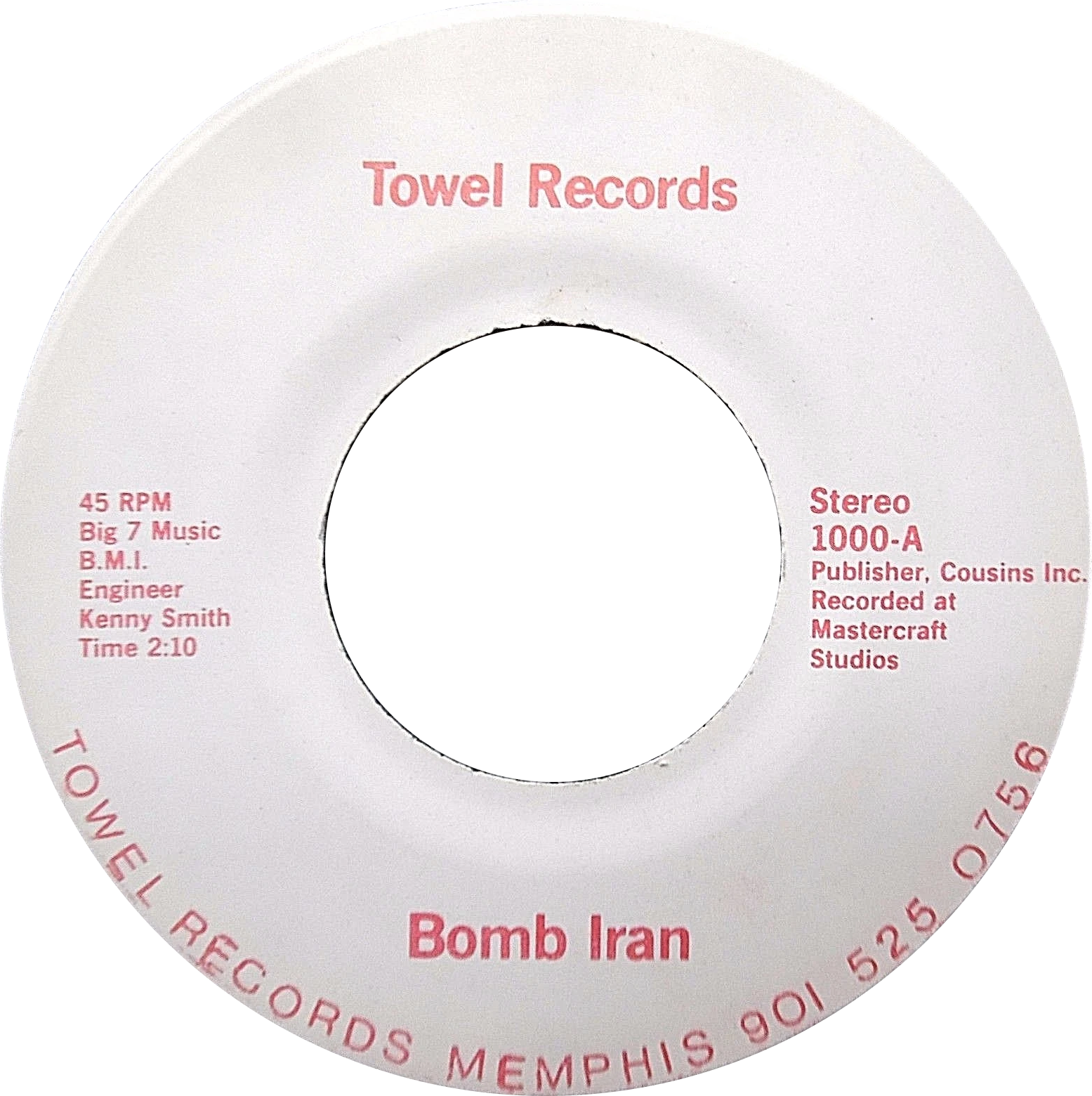
- One of earliest US singles

Single by Vince Vance & the Valiants
- Released: June 4, 1980
- Genre: Novelty
- Length: 2:23
- Label: Paid
- Songwriter: Fred Fassert
- Producers: Vince Vance & the Valiants

Vince Vance & the Valiants singles chronology
"Bomb Iran" (1980)	"All I Want for Christmas Is You" (1989)

The most popular version of "Bomb Iran" was recorded by Vince Vance & the Valiants in 1980. The single was popular and frequently requested on the radio, but never charted because it lacked distribution and the rights to the music were not properly acquired. The song threatening Iran with nuclear annihilation also provoked retaliatory death threats and other altercations against the lead singer. However, after some legal wrangling, the single was finally re-released by Paid Records in September 1980. After its second release, the song reached number 101 on the Billboard Bubbling Under Hot 100 Singles chart. The 1980 recording, along with a 1987 remix, was eventually included in the band's album I Know What it Means to Miss New Orleans, released in 1996.

One year after the original single release, in 1981, the band released another parody on the same topic called "Nuke Iran", to the tune of Gene Chandler's "Duke of Earl". In 2005, they created a similarly themed parody of the Coasters' song "Yakety Yak", this time with Iraq as the target, called "Yakety Yak (Bomb Iraq)". Foreshadowing this, The Rush Limbaugh Show in 1990 featured a parody of "Barbara Ann" called "Bomb Iraq" following the start of the Gulf War.

== John McCain controversy ==
The parody lived on and became political fodder when, on April 17, 2007, in Senator John McCain's (R-AZ) campaign for the 2008 presidential election, at an appearance in Murrells Inlet, South Carolina, he responded to an audience question about military action against Iran by referring to "that old Beach Boys song, 'Bomb Iran'", then singing the parody chorus, "Bomb, bomb, bomb, bomb, anyway, ah ..." McCain later claimed he was only joking, but his opponents used his comments against him throughout the 2008 campaign.

== 2025 US strikes on Iranian nuclear sites ==
Following the United States strikes on Iranian nuclear sites, President Donald Trump posted a video on Truth Social featuring the Vince Vance & the Valiants version of "Bomb Iran." The video included footage of B-2 Spirit stealth bombers, which were used in the operation to deploy GBU-57A/B MOP (Massive Ordnance Penetrator) bombs. The United States, along with Israel, would later attack Iran again on February 28, 2026, which included the assassination of Ali Khamenei.

== See also ==
- "Ayatollah", a parody version of "My Sharona" by Chicago radio personality Steve Dahl
