= List of Billboard Top Holiday Albums number ones of the 2020s =

The Top Holiday Albums chart is a seasonal chart published weekly by Billboard during the holiday months of each year. It tracks the best-selling Christmas and holiday albums in the United States. Throughout the 2020s, many albums, compilation albums, extended plays, and soundtrack albums reached the top spot of the chart.

== Chart history ==
Issue date	Title	Artist	Ref.
January 4, 2020	Christmas	Michael Bublé	
January 11, 2020	The Best of Pentatonix Christmas	Pentatonix	
October 10, 2020	My Gift	Carrie Underwood	
October 17, 2020	A Holly Dolly Christmas	Dolly Parton	
October 24, 2020	My Gift	Carrie Underwood	
October 31, 2020	My Gift	Carrie Underwood	
November 7, 2020	A Holly Dolly Christmas	Dolly Parton	
November 14, 2020	My Gift	Carrie Underwood	
November 21, 2020	My Gift	Carrie Underwood	
November 28, 2020	A Holly Dolly Christmas	Dolly Parton	
December 5, 2020	My Gift	Carrie Underwood	
December 12, 2020	Christmas	Michael Bublé	
December 19, 2020	Christmas	Michael Bublé	
December 26, 2020	Christmas	Michael Bublé	
January 2, 2021	Christmas	Michael Bublé	
January 9, 2021	Christmas	Michael Bublé	
October 9, 2021	My Gift	Carrie Underwood	
October 16, 2021	Soundtrack	Tim Burton's The Nightmare Before Christmas	
October 23, 2021	Soundtrack	Tim Burton's The Nightmare Before Christmas	
October 30, 2021	When Christmas Comes Around	Kelly Clarkson	
November 6, 2021	Soundtrack	Tim Burton's The Nightmare Before Christmas	
November 13, 2021	Soundtrack	Tim Burton's The Nightmare Before Christmas	
November 20, 2021	Christmas	Michael Bublé	
November 27, 2021	Christmas	Michael Bublé	
December 4, 2021	Christmas	Michael Bublé	
December 11, 2021	Christmas	Michael Bublé	
December 18, 2021	Christmas	Michael Bublé	
December 25, 2021	Christmas	Michael Bublé	
January 1, 2022	Christmas	Michael Bublé	
January 8, 2022	Christmas	Michael Bublé	
October 22, 2022	Soundtrack	Tim Burton's The Nightmare Before Christmas	
October 29, 2022	A Very Backstreet Christmas	Backstreet Boys	
November 5, 2022	Soundtrack	Tim Burton's The Nightmare Before Christmas	
November 12, 2022	Soundtrack	Tim Burton's The Nightmare Before Christmas	
November 19, 2022	Christmas	Michael Bublé	
November 26, 2022	Christmas	Michael Bublé	
December 3, 2022	Christmas	Michael Bublé	
December 10, 2022	Christmas	Michael Bublé	
December 17, 2022	Christmas	Michael Bublé	
December 24, 2022	Christmas	Michael Bublé	
December 31, 2022	Christmas	Michael Bublé	
January 7, 2023	Christmas	Michael Bublé	
November 4, 2023	Christmas	Cher	
November 11, 2023	Soundtrack	Tim Burton's The Nightmare Before Christmas	
November 18, 2023	Christmas	Michael Bublé	
November 25, 2023	Christmas	Michael Bublé	
December 2, 2023	Christmas	Michael Bublé	
December 9, 2023	Christmas	Michael Bublé	
December 16, 2023	Christmas	Michael Bublé	
December 23, 2023	Christmas	Michael Bublé	
December 30, 2023	Christmas	Michael Bublé	
January 6, 2024	Christmas	Michael Bublé	

== See also ==
- List of Billboard number one Holiday Digital Song Sales of the 2020s
- Billboard Christmas Holiday Charts
- List of best-selling Christmas albums in the United States
