= Fred Fassert =

American songwriter

Fred Fassert (born 1935) is an American songwriter most famously known for his composition "Barbara Ann", which was originally written for the band he was in at the time, The Regents. In 1961, the song reached #13 on the Billboard Hot 100 chart. It was covered by other artists, including the Beach Boys on their 1965 album, Beach Boys' Party!, with the single reaching #2 on the Billboard chart. Fassert wrote "Barbara Ann" for his sister, Barbara Ann Fassert. His brother, Chuck Fassert, was the original 2nd tenor of the Regents.

Vince Vance and the Valiants covered it with their 1980 hit song "Bomb Iran", inspired by the Iran hostage crisis of the previous year: this song indeed was set to the same tune, and the band credited Fassert as the composer.
