= Cord of 3 =

American rock band

Cord of 3 was an American rock band from Bowling Green, Kentucky. The band consisted of Randall Erskine (lead vocalist, rhythm guitar) and Robbie Bennett (lead guitar). The name refers to a paraphrasing of a Bible verse in Ecclesiastes 4:12. Since the release of the band's first album "Broken but Undeniably Hopeful" they have released four radio singles, and have reached #16 on billboard charts and #2 on the Christian rock CRW chart. After the death of their bass player Brandon Bradshaw, the name was retired and Erkine and Bennett reformed under the name Black Masquerade.

== Band history ==
=== Early years (2003-06) ===
The lead vocalist Randall Erskine started his own project (contemporary Christian) as a solo artist, traveling to churches in his local town. Erskine later recruited bass guitar player Dale Avery, Liz Okeson and drummer Chris Collins, to form "Big Daddy Dale". The name was based on their like of the band Big Daddy Weave, and their joke about Avery's weight. Robbie Bennett joined the band after filling in for Okeson at a show. Collins subsequently left the band to join the military, and was replaced by Michael Ballard.

=== Metamorphosis (2006) ===
Metamorphosis was the band's first single recorded as the group Cord of 3. It was recorded and engineered by Andrew Woody of Pendlwood studios in Nashville, Tennessee. The single be included on a self-titled EP recorded in their own home studio. This album was only available at live shows, and is no longer in production.

=== Broken but Undeniably Hopeful (2010) ===
Broken but Undeniably Hopeful was released in early June 2010. The album cover features Amanda Bradshaw, sister of former bass player Brandon Bradshaw. It was recorded and engineered by Tim Kenning Jr. of Pendlwood Studios, in Plain City, Ohio., with the exception of "Letter of My Life", which was recorded in Atlanta by Alex Rexroat of Pendlwood Studios. The album spawned 3 radio singles: "Broken but Undeniably Hopeful", "Breathe", and "Mask".

=== Additions and contributions ===
- Radio version of "Breathe" remixed and remastered by Robert Venable, of Off the Wall Studios.
- Radio version of "Letter of My Life" was remixed and remastered by Robert Venable as well. The song features Lester Estelle Jr. formerly of the band Pillar and Laura Jones as the female vocals from the band Silversyde.

In February 2013, the band's bass guitarist Brandon Bradshaw was shot during a road-rage incident in Bowling Green, KY, succumbing four days later from his wounds. In 2015, Erskine/Bennett changed the name of the band to Black Masquerade and released the Freak Show EP.

== Band members ==
=== Current ===
- Randall Erskine- lead vocalist, rhythm guitarist (2003–present)
- Robbie Bennett- lead guitarist (2003–present)
- Egg - lead egg (2003–present)

=== Former ===
- Cameron Hagan- bass guitarist (2013–2014)
- Tim Miller- drummer (2010–2013)
- Brandon Bradshaw - bass guitar (2008–2013) (deceased)
- Evan Butler- Bass guitar (2011)
- Mike Ballard- Drums (2004–2010)
- Dale Avery- Bass guitar (2003–2008)
- Trevor "Trigger" Thompson- Bass guitar (2005–2006)
- T.C. Huddleston- Bass guitar (2007–2008)
- Jerry McDonner- Guitar (2007–2008)
- Liz Okeson- Acoustic guitar (2003–2005)
- Nathan Hornback- Drums (2003–2004)

== Discography ==
Broken but Undeniably Hopeful (2010)
