= List of Billboard number one Holiday Digital Song Sales of the 2020s =

These are the Billboard Holiday Digital Song Sales chart number one hits from 2020 until 2023. The chart represents the top-downloaded Holiday songs, ranked by sales data as compiled by Nielsen SoundScan.

Issue date	Title	Artist	Released	Ref.
October 10, 2020	"Hallelujah"	Carrie Underwood & John Legend	2020	
October 17, 2020	"Hallelujah"	Pentatonix	2016	
October 24, 2020	"My Kind Of Present"	Meghan Trainor	2020	
October 31, 2020	"Hallelujah"	Pentatonix	2016	
November 7, 2020	"Under The Mistletoe"	Kelly Clarkson & Brett Eldredge	2020	
November 14, 2020	"I Need You Christmas"	Jonas Brothers	2020	
November 21, 2020	"Amazing Grace (My Chains Are Gone)"	Pentatonix	2020	
November 28, 2020	no chart	no chart	no chart	
December 5, 2020	"Rockin' Around the Christmas Tree"	Brenda Lee	1958	
December 12, 2020	"Rockin' Around the Christmas Tree"	Brenda Lee	1958	
December 19, 2020	"Oh Santa!"	Mariah Carey Featuring Ariana Grande & Jennifer Hudson	2020	
December 26, 2020	"All I Want For Christmas Is You"	Mariah Carey	1994	
January 2, 2021	"All I Want For Christmas Is You"	Mariah Carey	1994	
January 9, 2021	"All I Want For Christmas Is You"	Mariah Carey	1994	
December 4, 2021	"All I Want For Christmas Is You"	Mariah Carey	1994	
December 11, 2021	"Santa's Gotta Dirty Job"	John Rich & Mike Rowe	2021	
December 18, 2021	"Santa's Gotta Dirty Job"	John Rich & Mike Rowe	2021	
December 25, 2021	"All I Want For Christmas Is You"	Mariah Carey	1994	
January 1, 2022	"Sausage Rolls For Everyone"	LadBaby Featuring Ed Sheeran & Elton John	2021	
January 8, 2022	"Christmas Tree"	V	2021	
January 15, 2022	"Auld Lang Syne (The New Year's Anthem)"	Mariah Carey	2010	
December 3, 2022	"All I Want For Christmas Is You"	Mariah Carey	1994	
December 10, 2022	"All I Want For Christmas Is You"	Mariah Carey	1994	
December 17, 2022	"All I Want For Christmas Is You"	Mariah Carey	1994	
December 24, 2022	"All I Want For Christmas Is You"	Mariah Carey	1994	
December 31, 2022	"All I Want For Christmas Is You"	Mariah Carey	1994	
January 7, 2023	"All I Want For Christmas Is You"	Mariah Carey	1994	
December 2, 2023	"Fairytale of Philadelphia"	Jason Kelce & Travis Kelce	2023	
December 9, 2023	"DJ Play a Christmas Song"	Cher	2023	
December 16, 2023	"Rockin' Around The Christmas Tree"	Brenda Lee	1958	
December 23, 2023	"All I Want For Christmas Is You"	Mariah Carey	1994	
January 6, 2024	"All I Want For Christmas Is You"	Mariah Carey	1994	

== See also ==
- Billboard Christmas Holiday Charts
- Billboard number one Holiday Digital Song Sales 2010-2019
- Billboard Top Holiday Albums number ones of the 2020s
