= List of Billboard number one Holiday Songs 2010–2019 =

These are the Billboard Holiday Digital Song Sales chart number one hits from 2010 until 2019. The chart represents the top-downloaded Holiday songs, ranked by sales data as compiled by Nielsen SoundScan.

Issue date	Title	Artist	Released	Ref.
October 16, 2010	"All I Want For Christmas Is You"	Mariah Carey	1994	
October 23, 2010	"Happy Xmas (War Is Over)"	John & Yoko/The Plastic Ono Band	1971	
October 30, 2010	"Oh Santa!"	Mariah Carey	2010	
November 6, 2010	"Pie Jesu"	Jackie Evancho	2010	
November 13, 2010	"All I Want For Christmas Is You"	Mariah Carey	1994	
November 20, 2010	"All I Want For Christmas Is You"	Mariah Carey	1994	
November 27, 2010	"All I Want For Christmas Is You"	Mariah Carey	1994	
December 4, 2010	"O Holy Night"	Glee Cast	2010	
December 11, 2010	"All I Want For Christmas Is You"	Mariah Carey	1994	
December 18, 2010	"Christmas Lights"	Coldplay	2010	
December 25, 2010	"Christmas Lights"	Coldplay	2010	
January 1, 2011	"All I Want For Christmas Is You"	Mariah Carey	1994	
January 8, 2011	"All I Want For Christmas Is You"	Mariah Carey	1994	
January 15, 2011	"Shake Up Christmas"	Train	2010	
January 22, 2011	"Baby, It's Cold Outside"	Glee Cast	2010	
October 22, 2011	"All I Want For Christmas Is You"	Mariah Carey	1994	
October 29, 2011	"Baby, It's Cold Outside"	Dean Martin	1959	
November 5, 2011	"Mistletoe"	Justin Bieber	2011	
November 12, 2011	"The Christmas Song"	Justin Bieber Featuring Usher	2011	
November 19, 2011	"All I Want For Christmas Is You (SuperFestive!)"	Justin Bieber Duet With Mariah Carey	2011	
November 26, 2011	"Mistletoe"	Justin Bieber	2011	
December 3, 2011	"Mistletoe"	Justin Bieber	2011	
December 10, 2011	"Mistletoe"	Justin Bieber	2011	
December 17, 2011	"Mistletoe"	Justin Bieber	2011	
December 24, 2011	"Mistletoe"	Justin Bieber	2011	
December 31, 2011	"Mistletoe"	Justin Bieber	2011	
January 7, 2012	"Mistletoe"	Justin Bieber	2011	
January 14, 2012	"Mistletoe"	Justin Bieber	2011	
October 13, 2012	"It's The Most Wonderful Time Of The Year"	Andy Williams	1963	
October 20, 2012	"Mistletoe"	Justin Bieber	2011	
October 27, 2012	"Mistletoe"	Justin Bieber	2011	
November 3, 2012	"Christmas In Heaven"	Scotty McCreery	2012	
November 10, 2012	"All I Want For Christmas Is You"	Mariah Carey	1994	
November 17, 2012	"All I Want For Christmas Is You"	Mariah Carey	1994	
November 24, 2012	"It's Christmas Time Again"	Backstreet Boys	2012	
December 1, 2012	"All I Want For Christmas Is You"	Mariah Carey	1994	
December 8, 2012	"All I Want For Christmas Is You"	Mariah Carey	1994	
December 15, 2012	"All I Want For Christmas Is You"	Mariah Carey	1994	
December 22, 2012	"All I Want For Christmas Is You"	Mariah Carey	1994	
December 29, 2012	"All I Want For Christmas Is You"	Mariah Carey	1994	
January 5, 2013	"All I Want For Christmas Is You"	Mariah Carey	1994	
January 12, 2013	"All I Want For Christmas Is You"	Mariah Carey	1994	
October 26, 2013	"All I Want For Christmas Is You"	Mariah Carey	1994	
November 2, 2013	"White Christmas"	Kelly Clarkson	2013	
November 9, 2013	"White Christmas"	Kelly Clarkson	2013	
November 16, 2013	"Silent Night"	Kelly Clarkson	2013	
November 23, 2013	"All I Want For Christmas Is You"	Mariah Carey	1994	
November 30, 2013	"All I Want For Christmas Is You"	Mariah Carey	1994	
December 7, 2013	"Last Christmas"	Ariana Grande	2013	
December 14, 2013	"Last Christmas"	Ariana Grande	2013	
December 21, 2013	"Little Drummer Boy"	Pentatonix	2013	
December 28, 2013	"All I Want For Christmas Is You"	Mariah Carey	1994	
January 4, 2014	"All I Want For Christmas Is You"	Mariah Carey	1994	
January 11, 2014	"Do You Want to Build a Snowman?"	Kristen Bell, Agatha Lee Monn & Katie Lopez	2013	
October 25, 2014	"Do You Want to Build a Snowman?"	Kristen Bell, Agatha Lee Monn & Katie Lopez	2013	
November 1, 2014	"Do You Want to Build a Snowman?"	Kristen Bell, Agatha Lee Monn & Katie Lopez	2013	
November 8, 2014	"Do You Want to Build a Snowman?"	Kristen Bell, Agatha Lee Monn & Katie Lopez	2013	
November 15, 2014	"Do You Want to Build a Snowman?"	Kristen Bell, Agatha Lee Monn & Katie Lopez	2013	
November 22, 2014	"Do You Want to Build a Snowman?"	Kristen Bell, Agatha Lee Monn & Katie Lopez	2013	
November 29, 2014	"Mary, Did You Know?"	Pentatonix	2014	
December 6, 2014	"Do They Know It's Christmas? (2014)"	Band Aid 30	2014	
December 13, 2014	"Santa Tell Me"	Ariana Grande	2014	
December 20, 2014	"Mary, Did You Know?"	Pentatonix	2014	
December 27, 2014	"Mary, Did You Know?"	Pentatonix	2014	
January 3, 2015	"All I Want For Christmas Is You"	Mariah Carey	1994	
January 10, 2015	"Santa Tell Me"	Ariana Grande	2014	
October 24, 2015	"All I Want For Christmas Is You"	Mariah Carey	1994	
October 31, 2015	"All I Want For Christmas Is You"	Mariah Carey	1994	
November 7, 2015	"All I Want For Christmas Is You"	Mariah Carey	1994	
November 14, 2015	"All I Want For Christmas Is You"	Mariah Carey	1994	
November 21, 2015	"All I Want For Christmas Is You"	Mariah Carey	1994	
November 28, 2015	"All I Want For Christmas Is You"	Mariah Carey	1994	
December 5, 2015	"All I Want For Christmas Is You"	Mariah Carey	1994	
December 12, 2015	"All I Want For Christmas Is You"	Mariah Carey	1994	
December 19, 2015	"All I Want For Christmas Is You"	Mariah Carey	1994	
December 26, 2015	"All I Want For Christmas Is You"	Mariah Carey	1994	
January 2, 2016	"Mary Did You Know"	Jordan Smith	2015	
January 9, 2016	"All I Want For Christmas Is You"	Mariah Carey	1994	
October 22, 2015	"All I Want For Christmas Is You"	Mariah Carey	1994	
October 29, 2015	"All I Want For Christmas Is You"	Mariah Carey	1994	
November 5, 2016	"All I Want For Christmas Is You"	Mariah Carey	1994	
November 12, 2016	"Hallelujah"	Pentatonix	2016	
November 19, 2016	"Hallelujah"	Pentatonix	2016	
November 26, 2016	"Hallelujah"	Pentatonix	2016	
December 3, 2016	"Hallelujah"	Pentatonix	2016	
December 10, 2016	"Hallelujah"	Pentatonix	2016	
December 17, 2016	"Hallelujah"	Pentatonix	2016	
December 24, 2016	"Hallelujah"	Pentatonix	2016	
December 31, 2016	"Hallelujah"	Pentatonix	2016	
January 7, 2017	"Hallelujah"	Pentatonix	2016	
October 21, 2017	"Hallelujah"	Pentatonix	2016	
October 28, 2017	"Hallelujah"	Pentatonix	2016	
November 4, 2017	"Hallelujah"	Pentatonix	2016	
November 11, 2017	"Hallelujah"	Pentatonix	2016	
November 18, 2017	"All I Want For Christmas Is You"	Mariah Carey	1994	
November 25, 2017	"All I Want For Christmas Is You"	Mariah Carey	1994	
November 26, 2017	"All I Want For Christmas Is You"	Mariah Carey	1994	
December 2, 2017	"All I Want For Christmas Is You"	Mariah Carey	1994	
December 9, 2017	"All I Want For Christmas Is You"	Mariah Carey	1994	
December 16, 2017	"All I Want For Christmas Is You"	Mariah Carey	1994	
December 23, 2017	"All I Want For Christmas Is You"	Mariah Carey	1994	
December 30, 2017	"All I Want For Christmas Is You"	Mariah Carey	1994	
January 3, 2018	"O Holy Night"	Brooke Simpson	2017	
January 6, 2018	"All I Want For Christmas Is You"	Mariah Carey	1994	
October 20, 2018	"Hallelujah"	Pentatonix	2016	
October 27, 2018	"Hallelujah"	Pentatonix	2016	
November 3, 2018	"I Wonder As I Wander"	Lindsey Stirling	2017	
November 10, 2018	"All I Want For Christmas Is You"	Mariah Carey	1994	
November 17, 2018	"All I Want For Christmas Is You"	Mariah Carey	1994	
November 24, 2017	"All I Want For Christmas Is You"	Mariah Carey	1994	
December 1, 2018	"All I Want For Christmas Is You"	Mariah Carey	1994	
December 8, 2018	"All I Want For Christmas Is You"	Mariah Carey	1994	
December 15, 2018	"All I Want For Christmas Is You"	Mariah Carey	1994	
December 22, 2018	"All I Want For Christmas Is You"	Mariah Carey	1994	
December 29, 2018	"All I Want For Christmas Is You"	Mariah Carey	1994	
January 5, 2019	"All I Want For Christmas Is You"	Mariah Carey	1994	
October 19, 2019	"Hallelujah"	Pentatonix	2016	
October 26, 2019	"Hallelujah"	Pentatonix	2016	
November 2, 2019	"All I Want For Christmas Is You"	Mariah Carey	1994	
November 9, 2019	"All I Want For Christmas Is You"	Mariah Carey	1994	
November 16, 2019	"All I Want For Christmas Is You"	Mariah Carey	1994	
November 23, 2019	"Like It's Christmas"	Jonas Brothers	2017	
November 30, 2019	"All I Want For Christmas Is You"	Mariah Carey	1994	
December 7, 2019	"All I Want For Christmas Is You"	Mariah Carey	1994	
December 14, 2019	"All I Want For Christmas Is You"	Mariah Carey	1994	
December 21, 2019	"All I Want For Christmas Is You"	Mariah Carey	1994	
December 28, 2019	"Wintersong"	Jake Hoot & Kelly Clarkson	2019	
January 4, 2020	"All I Want For Christmas Is You"	Mariah Carey	1994	
January 11, 2020	"Auld Lang Syne"	Guy Lombardo	1947	

== Holiday Songs / Holiday Airplay 2010-2019 ==
Five songs alternated topping the Holiday Airplay chart from 2010 and 2019:

- Bobby Helms' 1957 "Jingle Bell Rock" for one week on 11/27/10,
- Mariah Carey's "All I Want for Christmas Is You" for 31 weeks (2 weeks from 12/4-11/2010, 2 weeks from 1/1-8/2011, 3 weeks from 12/24/2011-1/7/2012, 1 week on 1/5/2013, 3 weeks from 12/28/2013-1/11/2014, 1 week on 1/3/2015, 4 weeks from 12/19/2015-1/9/2016, 3 weeks from 12/24/2016-1/7/2017 and 12 weeks from 12/30/2017-1/4/2020),
- Brenda Lee's 1958 "Rockin' Around the Christmas Tree" for 9 weeks (1 week on 12/18/2010, 1 week on 12/10/2011, 3 weeks from 12/15-29/2012, 2 weeks from 12/14-21/2013, 1 week on 12/12/2015 and 1 week on 12/10/2016),
- Burl Ives' 1964 "A Holly Jolly Christmas" for 5 weeks (on the weeks of 12/25/2010, 12/17/2011, 12/8/2012, 12/13/2014, and 12/9/2017) and
- Jose Feliciano's 1971's "Feliz Navidad" for 6 total weeks (2 weeks from 12/20-27/2014, 1 week on 1/10/2015, 1 week on 12/17/2016 and 2 weeks from 12/16-23/2017).

== Hot Holiday Songs / Holiday 100 2011-2019 ==
Five songs topped the Holiday 100 from the chart's debut in 2011 until 2019:

- Mariah Carey's "All I Want for Christmas Is You" for 40 weeks,
- Justin Bieber's "Mistletoe" on 1/7/2012,
- Pentatonix's "Little Drummer Boy" on 12/21/13,
- Pentatonix's "Mary, Did You Know?" for 2 weeks from 12/13-20/2014 and
- Ariana Grande's "Santa Tell Me" on 1/10/2015.

== Holiday Streaming Songs 2013-2019 ==
The only songs that topped Holiday Streaming Songs from the chart's debut in 2013 until 2019 are Mariah Carey's "All I Want For Christmas Is You" for 30 weeks, Pentatonix's "Mary, Did You Know?" for 3 weeks from 12/13-27/2014 and Ariana Grande's "Santa Tell Me" for 2 weeks from 1/3-10/2015 .

== See also ==
- Billboard Christmas Holiday Charts
- List of Billboard number one Holiday Digital Song Sales of the 2020s
- List of Billboard number one Holiday Songs 2001-2010
- List of Billboard Top Holiday Albums number ones of the 2010s
