= Do You Hear What I Hear? =

1962 song by Gloria Shayne and Noël Regney

Single by The Harry Simeone Chorale
- Written: October 1962
- Label: Mercury
- Songwriter: Noël Regney
- Composer: Gloria Shayne
- Lyricist: Noël Regney

"Do You Hear What I Hear?" is a song written in October 1962, with lyrics by Noël Regney and music by Gloria Shayne. The pair, married at the time, wrote it as a plea for peace during the Cuban Missile Crisis. Regney had been invited by a record producer to write a Christmas song, but he was hesitant due to the commercialism of Christmas. It has sold tens of millions of copies and has been covered by hundreds of artists.

== Synopsis ==
"Do You Hear What I Hear?" tells a story loosely based upon the story of the Nativity of Jesus as told in the Gospel of Matthew, incorporating fragments of the annunciation to the shepherds from the Gospel of Luke, though Jesus is never mentioned by name or explicitly identified. A "night wind" tells a lamb of a star, following which the lamb tells his young shepherd that he also hears a loud song. They are each led to a "mighty king," whom they tell of a child in the cold and ask to bring the child silver and gold (much as the Biblical Magi, which are often characterized as kings, did with their gifts of gold, frankincense, and myrrh). The king proclaims a prayer of peace and announces that the child will "bring goodness and light".

== Lyrics ==
Regney wrote the lyrics for the song, while Shayne composed the music in October 1962. This was an unusual arrangement for the two writers. Usually, it was Shayne who wrote the lyrics for their songs while Regney composed the music, as they did when they wrote a song based on the classic children's song "Rain, Rain, Go Away".

Regney was inspired to write the lyrics "Said the night wind to the little lamb, 'Do you see what I see?'" and "Pray for peace, people everywhere" after watching babies being pushed in strollers on the sidewalks of New York City. Shayne stated in an interview years later that neither could personally perform the entire song at the time they wrote it because of the emotions surrounding the Cuban Missile Crisis: "Our little song broke us up. You must realize there was a threat of war at the time".

== Recordings ==
=== Original ===
"Do You Hear What I Hear?" was released shortly after Thanksgiving in 1962. The song was originally recorded for Mercury Records by the Harry Simeone Chorale, a group that had also popularized "The Little Drummer Boy", and released as part of the album The Wonderful Songs of Christmas with the Harry Simeone Chorale. As a 45 rpm single, it went on to sell more than a quarter-million copies during the 1962 Christmas holiday season.

Bing Crosby made the song into a hit when he recorded his own version of it on October 21, 1963. Released as a single on October 26, it peaked at no. 2 in the Billboard Christmas Singles chart dated 28 December (behind "White Christmas" by Andy Williams). Crosby also performed the song on a Bob Hope Christmas television special on December 13 of that year. Over the years, Crosby's recording of the song has been widely played on the radio and has been available on numerous compilation Christmas albums and compact discs put out by Capitol Records.

=== Cover versions ===
The song has been recorded by hundreds of artists. Among the most notable are:

- Andy Williams (1965 – Merry Christmas)
- Pat Boone (1966 – Christmas Is A Comin')
- Kate Smith (1966 – The Kate Smith Christmas Album)
- Diahann Carroll (1967 – The Great Songs of Christmas, Album Seven)
- Jim Nabors (1967 – Jim Nabors' Christmas Album)
- Perry Como (1968 – The Perry Como Christmas Album)
- Robert Goulet (1968 – Robert Goulet's Wonderful World of Christmas)
- Mahalia Jackson (1968 – Christmas with Mahalia)
- Johnny Mathis (1969 – Give Me Your Love for Christmas)
- Whitney Houston (1987 – A Very Special Christmas)
- Bob Dylan (2009 – Christmas in the Heart)

Regney said that his favorite version of the song was performed by Robert Goulet; as The New York Times noted, when the singer came to the line "pray for peace, people everywhere", he "almost shouted the words".

== Charts ==
=== Whitney Houston version ===
"Do You Hear What I Hear?"

Promotional single by Whitney Houston

from the album A Very Special Christmas
- Released: 1987
- Studio: A&M Studios (Hollywood, CA); Reflection Sound Studios (Charlotte, NC)
- Genre: Christmas music; R&B; soul; gospel
- Length: 3:32
- Label: Arista; Legacy
- Songwriters: Gloria Shayne; Noël Regney
- Producer: Jimmy Iovine

"Do You Hear What I Hear?"

Promotional single by Pentatonix and Whitney Houston

from the album The Best of Pentatonix Christmas
- Released: October 25, 2019
- Length: 3:33
- Label: RCA
- Songwriters: Gloria Shayne; Noël Regney
- Producers: Pentatonix; Ben Bram

Houston originally recorded the song as part of the various-artists compilation A Very Special Christmas in 1987, omitting the first verse. In 1995, Houston included the song in her CD single for her number one single, "Exhale (Shoop Shoop)". Her version peaked at the top of Billboard Gospel Digital Songs and Gospel Streaming Songs on 2011 and 2018 and stayed for a record 42 weeks on the former while 30 weeks on the latter.

When the song topped the former chart, it made Houston one of the few artists to score a number one Billboard single in four decades. When she topped the same chart with the song for the week of December 5, 2020, Houston became one of the few to have entered number one on a Billboard chart for five.

On October 25, 2019, Pentatonix released their cover version featuring Houston's vocals, as part of the group's compilation album The Best of Pentatonix Christmas. The Pentatonix version would go on to peak at number 9 on the US Adult Contemporary chart, making it Houston's 25th Top 10 single on the chart.

=== Weekly charts ===
2011 weekly chart performance for Houston's Do You Hear What I Hear?
Chart (2011)	Peak position
US Gospel Digital Songs (Billboard)	1
US Holiday 100 (Billboard)	35

2018 weekly chart performance for Houston's Do You Hear What I Hear?
Chart (2018)	Peak position
US Gospel Streaming Songs (Billboard)	1

2022–2024 weekly chart performance for Houston's Do You Hear What I Hear?
Chart (2022–2024)	Peak position
US Digital Song Sales (Billboard)	37
Romania Airplay (TopHit)	98
US Holiday Digital Song Sales (Billboard)	16
US R&B Digital Song Sales (Billboard)	4
US R&B/Hip-Hop Digital Song Sales (Billboard)	4

==== Whitney Houston with Pentatonix version ====
2018–2019 weekly chart performance for Houston's Do You Hear What I Hear? with Pentatonix
Chart (2018–2019)	Peak position
US Adult Contemporary (Billboard) with Pentatonix	9
US Holiday Digital Song Sales (Billboard) with Pentatonix	3

=== Year-end charts ===
2013 year-end chart performance for Houston's Do You Hear What I Hear?
Chart (2013)	Position
US Gospel Digital Songs (Billboard)	20

2016 year-end chart performance for Houston's Do You Hear What I Hear?
Chart (2016)	Position
US Gospel Digital Songs (Billboard)	23

2017 year-end chart performance for Houston's Do You Hear What I Hear?
Chart (2017)	Position
US Gospel Digital Songs (Billboard)	20
US Gospel Streaming Songs (Billboard)	30

2018 year-end chart performance for Houston's Do You Hear What I Hear?
Chart (2018)	Position
US Gospel Digital Songs (Billboard)	11
US Gospel Streaming Songs (Billboard)	26

2019 year-end chart performance for Houston's Do You Hear What I Hear?
Chart (2019)	Position
US Gospel Digital Songs (Billboard)	21
US Gospel Streaming Songs (Billboard)	27

2020 year-end chart performance for Houston's Do You Hear What I Hear?
Chart (2020)	Position
US Gospel Digital Songs (Billboard)	18
US Gospel Streaming Songs (Billboard)	16

2021 year-end chart performance for Houston's Do You Hear What I Hear?
Chart (2021)	Position
US Gospel Digital Songs (Billboard)	14

2022 year-end chart performance for Houston's Do You Hear What I Hear?
Chart (2022)	Position
US Gospel Digital Songs (Billboard)	8
US Gospel Streaming Songs (Billboard)	23

2023 year-end chart performance for Houston's Do You Hear What I Hear?
Chart (2023)	Position
US Gospel Digital Songs (Billboard)	9
US Gospel Streaming Songs (Billboard)	16

2024 year-end chart performance for Houston's Do You Hear What I Hear?
Chart (2024)	Position
US Gospel Digital Songs (Billboard)	15
US Gospel Streaming Songs (Billboard)	17

2025 year-end chart performance for Houston's Do You Hear What I Hear?
Chart (2025)	Position
US Gospel Digital Songs (Billboard)	14
US Gospel Streaming Songs (Billboard)	15

=== All-time charts ===
All-time chart performance for Houston's Do You Hear What I Hear?
Chart	Peak position
US Holiday 100 (Billboard)	85

=== Certifications ===
Region	Certification	Certified units/sales
United States (RIAA)	Gold	500,000^{‡}
^{‡} Sales+streaming figures based on certification alone.

== See also ==
- List of Christmas carols
