= The Regents (doo-wop band) =

American vocal group

- Origin: The Bronx, New York, U.S.
- Genres: Doo-wop; R&B
- Years active: 1958–1990s
- Labels: Gee Records
- Past members: Ernie Maresca; Chuck Fassert; Guy Villari; Sal Cuomo; Tony Gravagna; Ron Hunerberg

The Regents were an American doo-wop vocal group from New York, operating in the late 1950s and early 1960s.

They are best known for recording the hit "Barbara-Ann" in 1958, which was released in 1961 and reached No. 13 on the Billboard Hot 100 chart. (It was covered by the Beach Boys in 1965 on their album, Beach Boys' Party!; this version when released as a single made No. 2.) The Regents also had a second chart hit with "Runaround", which hit No. 28 later in 1961.

== Original members ==
- Ernie Maresca (replaced by Don Jacobucci)
- Chuck Fassert (brother of "Barbara-Ann" author Fred Fassert)
- Guy Villari (Gaetano Villari, August 11, 1942, The Bronx, New York – September 21, 2017, Middletown, Orange County, New York)
- Sal Cuomo (Salvatore Cuomo 1939 – 2013 The Bronx, New York)
- Tony 'Hot Rod' Gravanga (played sax, too)
- Ron Hunerberg (1941 – 2017 West Palm Beach, Florida)

== Biography ==
The group formed in The Bronx, New York, in 1958.

Group members included Guy Villari on lead; Sal Cuomo, first tenor-lead on "Laura" & “I'm So Lonely"; Chuck Fassert, second tenor; Don Jacobucci (who co-wrote "Barbara Ann" B-side "I’m So Lonely" with Cuomo) sax player/baritone; Tony Gravagna on bass; Ron Hunerberg on drums.

An earlier version of the group from 1957 was called The Monterays, and included Villari, Cuomo, Fassert and Ernie Maresca (who later had a hit with "Shout! Shout! (Knock Yourself Out)", and also wrote songs such as the Regents' "Runaround" and "The Wanderer" recorded by Dion).

The group recorded demos at Bell Sound, Associated, and Regent Sound studios. They were signed to Seville Records as The Desires, however, none of the songs they recorded were released, until the group had success three years later as The Regents. The Regents' name came from a combination of recording a demo at Regent Sound studio, and the fact that Villari smoked Regents cigarettes.

In 1958 the group recorded Cuomo's "A Teenager's Love". At the same recording session they waxed "Barbara-Ann" in three takes. Shortly afterwards, Tony Gravagna was installed into the group. Unable to secure a recording contract, they disbanded about a year later.

Eddie Jacobucci revived the Regents by accident. His group, the Consorts, lacked original songs for an audition, so they recorded a version of "Barbara-Ann". The owner of Cousins Records heard the track and decided to release the original version by the Regents. The original group reunited, and Cousins released "Barbara-Ann" in March 1961. It became a No. 1 record in New York; the demand was such that Cousins leased it to Roulette/Gee for worldwide distribution, and it reached No. 13 in the Billboard Hot 100. Their follow-up release, "Runaround", written by Maresca, went to No. 28 on the pop chart and No. 30 R&B. They released two more records for Gee, but after a royalties dispute with the record label, the group broke up.

They reformed in 1970 with Villari the only remaining original member. Joining Villari was Ron Lapinsky (aka Ron Anthony) and Bob Falcone, both of whom performed with the original Regents group post recording and in various offshoots (eg The Runarounds). They were soon joined by guitarist and vocalist Jamie Bannon who remained with group throughout its lifetime as musical director. The group enjoyed success in personal appearances and toured extensively across the United States. They also made many television appearances. In 1988 they were selected as one of only four "oldies" groups to appear on the Grammy Awards Show.

In 1995, "Guy Villari and the Regents" was formed, which included Tony Valitutto, Frank Civatillo and Tony Cacace making up the vocals, while Richard Rogers, Joel DeRuggiero and Sal DiCicco provided the instrumentation. Concurrently, Lapinsky, Falcone and Bannon and the long running Regents band continued as "The Regents" into the 21st century. This version of the group along with original member Chuck Fassert appeared on the TJ Lubinski PBS music series in 2007. Villari died in 2017. Ron Anthony Lapinsky died in 2021.

== Namesakes ==
A group called The Regents released a gatefold album in 1964 (unusual for rock groups at the time). It was recorded live in Hollywood, California and titled Live at the AM/PM Discotheque (Capitol SKAO 2153).

Another band by the name of The Regents recorded the song "7 Teen" in 1979. It reached No. 11 on the UK Singles Chart.

== Discography ==
=== Singles ===
Year	Title	Peak chart positions		Record Label	B-side	Album
Year	Title	US Pop	US R&B	Record Label	B-side	Album
1961	"Barbara-Ann"	13	7	Gee	"I'm So Lonely"	Barbara-Ann
1961	"Runaround"	28	30	Gee	"Laura My Darling"	Barbara-Ann
1961	"Liar"	—	—	Gee	"Don't Be a Fool"	
1961	"Lonesome Boy"	—	—	Gee	"Oh Baby"	Barbara-Ann
