= You for Christmas =

Single by Kelly Clarkson

from the album When Christmas Comes Around... Again
- Released: September 27, 2024
- Recorded: 2024
- Studio: Zelig Studios (New York, NY); Abbey Road Studios (London, England)
- Genre: Pop
- Length: 2:54
- Label: Atlantic
- Songwriters: Kelly Clarkson; Mark Ronson; Andrew Wyatt
- Producer: Mark Ronson

Kelly Clarkson singles chronology
"From the Jump" (2024)	"You for Christmas" (2024)	"DJ Play a Christmas Song" (remix) (2024)

"You for Christmas" is a song by American singer Kelly Clarkson from the deluxe reissue of her ninth studio album When Christmas Comes Around.... She and Andrew Wyatt co-wrote the track with its producer Mark Ronson. The song was released by Atlantic Records on September 27, 2024. This is the first time she has collaborated with Wyatt and Ronson.

== Release ==
Clarkson first announced the single on September 23, 2024. It was released by Atlantic Records on September 27, 2024. On September 26, she shared a preview of the songs lyrics on her social media accounts.

== Composition ==
"You for Christmas" is a Christmas song written by Clarkson, Andrew Wyatt, and Mark Ronson with production by Ronson.

== Promotion ==
Clarkson first sang the track live during NBC's Christmas in Rockefeller on December 4, 2024. On December 9, 2024, she performed the song on The Today Show. She also sang it on the twenty-sixth season finale The Voice on December 10, 2024.

== Charts ==
=== Weekly charts ===
Weekly chart performance for "You for Christmas"
Chart (2024)	Peak position
Canada AC (Billboard)	2
New Zealand Hot Singles (RMNZ)	13
US Adult Contemporary (Billboard)	5

=== Year-end charts ===
Year-end chart performance for "You for Christmas"
Chart (2025)	Position
US Adult Contemporary (Billboard)	37

== Release history ==
List of release dates, showing region, release format, catalog, and label
Region	Date	Format	Label	Catalog No.	Ref.
Various	September 27, 2024	Digital download; streaming	Atlantic		
