= When Christmas Comes Around... =

2021 studio album by Kelly Clarkson

Studio album by Kelly Clarkson
- Released: October 15, 2021
- Studios: Brooklyn Bridge Music; The Eastwood Stage at Warner Bros. Studio; Everland Studios; Glenwood Place Studios; The Listening Station; Manhattan Beach Recording; Ocean Way; The Ribcage; Southern Ground; The Vibe Room
- Genre: Pop
- Length: 47:51
- Label: Atlantic
- Producers: Aben Eubanks; Jason Halbert; Mark Ronson; Jesse Shatkin; Joseph Trapanese

Kelly Clarkson chronology
Meaning of Life (2017)	When Christmas Comes Around... (2021)	Kellyoke (2022)

Singles from When Christmas Comes Around...
- 1. "Christmas Isn't Canceled (Just You)" Released: September 23, 2021; 2. "Santa, Can't You Hear Me" Released: December 9, 2022

Alternative cover
- Reissue cover

When Christmas Comes Around... is the second Christmas album and ninth studio album by American singer Kelly Clarkson, released through Atlantic Records on October 15, 2021. Produced by Jesse Shatkin, Jason Halbert, Joseph Trapanese and Aben Eubanks, it is her second Christmas album after Wrapped in Red (2013) and a follow-up to her eighth album Meaning of Life (2017). Conceived after the emotional turmoil of her public divorce, When Christmas Comes Around... is a breakup holiday album that features cover versions of Christmas songs, as well as original co-penned tracks and duets with Chris Stapleton, Ariana Grande, and Brett Eldredge.

Critics broadly praised When Christmas Comes Around... for Clarkson’s powerful, versatile vocals and mix of fresh originals with standout classics, though some noted uneven production and felt the new songs failed to match her previous holiday work. At the 65th Annual Grammy Awards, the album was nominated for Best Traditional Pop Vocal Album. Promotion for the album included a Christmas special of the same title, which premiered on NBC on December 1, 2021. The Christmas special premiered with a 0.6 rating and 4.3 million total viewers. Its release was preceded by the singles "Christmas Isn't Canceled (Just You)" and "Santa, Can't You Hear Me". It also includes previously released singles "Christmas Eve", "All I Want for Christmas Is You", and "Under the Mistletoe" as bonus tracks. A deluxe reissue of the album featuring two new tracks was released on November 1, 2024, including the single "You for Christmas".

== Background and recording ==
"My purpose for choosing this lyric as the title of this project was to bring forth a sense of reality to the fact that we are probably in very different places emotionally When Christmas Comes Around... Some of us are consumed with a new love, some of us reminded of loss, some filled with optimism for the coming new year, others elated for some much deserved time away from the chaos our work lives can sometimes bring us. Wherever you are, and whatever you may be experiencing, I wanted everyone to be able to connect to a message on this album. Each year you may even have a new favorite depending on where you are in your life, but while change can be unpredictable there is no better time of year, in my opinion, to breathe hope into one’s life and let possibility wander."

— Clarkson on naming the album When Christmas Comes Around...

Following the release of her first Christmas album Wrapped in Red in 2013 on RCA Records, Clarkson transferred to Atlantic Records and has issued the Christmas tracks "Christmas Eve" (2017), "Under the Mistletoe" (with Brett Eldredge), and a cover of Vince Vance & the Valiants' "All I Want for Christmas Is You" (2020). In an interview on the television program Entertainment Tonight, she revealed that she was not originally intending to record another Christmas studio album due to her fondness for her first, but later decided to following the emotional stress induced by the highly publicized divorce the previous year. In recording the album, Clarkson recorded cover versions of various Christmas classics and wrote new material featuring duets with American recording artists Chris Stapleton and Ariana Grande.

=== Themes and inspirations ===
Atlantic Records has promoted When Christmas Comes Around... as an exploration of "a wide range of holiday emotions and experiences anchored by Clarkson's incomparable vocal prowess". Clarkson has elaborated that the album will explore various themes of love, loss, hope, and optimism — emotions that people tend to experience during the holiday season.

Drawing inspiration from her experiences during the past two years, she remarked of the album's title, her first to not have a titular track since My December (2007), as "when Christmas comes around, we are all in different places." Further adding that its selection of tracks will both evoke a somber and posit a jolly atmosphere. Characterizing it as "a different Christmas album", she portrayed When Christmas Comes Around... as feeling more like a normal studio album, but "there's Christmas sprinkled on it."

== Release ==
When Christmas Comes Around... was released by Atlantic Records on October 15, 2021. A special edition shipped exclusively to Target retail stores would also feature a Christmas card signed by Clarkson. Its lead single "Christmas Isn't Canceled (Just You)", was released on September 23, 2021. "Glow" with Stapleton and "Santa, Can't You Hear Me" with Grande were released as promotional singles alongside the album's release. The deluxe reissue of the album entitled When Christmas Comes Around… Again was released on November 1, 2024.

== Critical reception ==
Professional ratings
Review scores
Source	Rating
AllMusic	3/5 stars
Slant Magazine	3.5/5 stars

In a roundup of new holiday albums, The New York Times music critic Jon Caramanica praised Clarkson's "nimble" vocals and wrote that the original tracks, some of them strikingly "uncelebratory," make the album stand out. In the year-end episode of his Times podcast Popcast, Caramanica again praised the album, calling it "very, very good [...] solid [and] impressive," though "not quite Mariah-level." Mike DeWald of Riff Magazine praised how Clarkson's original songs are "something fresh and listenable." Alan Sculley, writing for The Wichita Eagle, called When Christmas Comes Around... another "stellar holiday album". He found that it was "anything but the typical holiday album" and concluded: "Whatever the songs, they often come with full orchestration and plenty of studio polish, yet don't sound overproduced. Now with two stellar holiday albums to her credit, fans will be ready whenever another Clarkson Christmas album comes around again.

Sal Cinquemani of Slant Magazine, who gave the album three-and-a-half out of five stars, criticized some production choices but praised Clarkson's "impressive" vocals and "melodic variations" on the classics as the "chief selling point." Marcy Donelson of AllMusic gave the album three out of five stars, called it "a vibrant, fully orchestral, high-volume set on average", and singled out "Merry Christmas (To the One I Used to Know)" and "Santa, Can't You Hear Me" as highlights among the newest tracks." Helmi Yusof from The Business Times noted that "Clarkson keeps it classy with her second Christmas album." He felt that "the best songs are the familiar ones, such as George Michael's "Last Christma"s sung as a slinky jazz number and "Jingle Bell Rocks" getting some lift from her powerful lungs." Vulture's Justin Curto called Clarkson "the queen of the holidays", calling the album a gift for Christmas. Curto especially appreciated the collaboration with Ariana Grande, as it sounds "as majestic as you would expect from the two singers." Sal Cinquemani from Slant Magazine found that while the original songs on When Christmas Comes Around... "don't quite live up to the lofty bar she previously set" on Wrapped in Red, the album "juxtaposes the yuletide blues with jubilant holiday standards," further noting that "Clarkson's vocals, then, are the album’s chief selling point."

== Commercial performance ==
By December 2021, the album had sold 93,000 album-equivalent units.

== Track listing ==
When Christmas Comes Around...
No.	Title	Writer(s)	Producer(s)	Length
1.	"Merry Christmas Baby"	Kelly Clarkson; Aben Eubanks	Jesse Shatkin	3:45
2.	"It's Beginning to Look a Lot Like Christmas"	Meredith Willson	Shatkin	1:54
3.	"Christmas Isn't Canceled (Just You)"	Clarkson; Jason Halbert; Jessi Collins	Halbert; Joseph Trapanese	3:51
4.	"Merry Christmas (To the One I Used to Know)"	Clarkson; Eubanks; Halbert	Halbert; Trapanese	4:10
5.	"Rockin' Around the Christmas Tree"	Johnny Marks	Shatkin	1:52
6.	"Glow" (with Chris Stapleton)	Clarkson; Halbert; Floyd Nathaniel Hills; Hayley Warner; Jesse Thomas	Halbert	3:18
7.	"Santa Baby"	Joan Javits; Philip Springer	Halbert	2:50
8.	"Santa, Can't You Hear Me" (with Ariana Grande)	Clarkson; Eubanks	Halbert	4:02
9.	"Last Christmas"	George Michael	Halbert	3:09
10.	"Jingle Bell Rock"	Joseph Beal; James Ross Boothe	Shatkin	1:56
11.	"Blessed"	Lindy Robbins; Toby Gad; Nicole Cohen	Halbert	3:34
12.	"Christmas Come Early"	Bobby Strand; Brock Baker; Molly Kate Kestner; Dave Lubben	Halbert	2:59
13.	"Under the Mistletoe" (with Brett Eldredge; Bonus track)	Clarkson; Eubanks	Eubanks; Shatkin	3:45
14.	"All I Want for Christmas Is You" (Bonus track)	Andy Stone; Troy Powers	Shatkin	3:46
15.	"Christmas Eve" (Bonus track)	Clarkson; Halbert	Halbert	3:00
Total length:				47:51

When Christmas Comes Around... Again – Deluxe edition
No.	Title	Writer(s)	Producer(s)	Length
1.	"You for Christmas"	Clarkson; Mark Ronson; Andrew Wyatt	Ronson	2:54
2.	"Sleigh Ride"	Leroy Anderson; Mitchell Parish	Ronson	2:10
3.	"Merry Christmas Baby"	Clarkson; Eubanks	Shatkin	3:45
4.	"It's Beginning to Look a Lot Like Christmas"	Willson	Shatkin	1:54
5.	"Christmas Isn't Canceled (Just You)"	Clarkson; Halbert; Collins	Halbert; Trapanese	3:51
6.	"Merry Christmas (To the One I Used to Know)"	Clarkson; Eubanks; Halbert	Halbert; Trapanese	4:10
7.	"Rockin' Around the Christmas Tree"	Marks	Shatkin	1:52
8.	"Glow" (with Chris Stapleton)	Clarkson; Halbert; Hills; Warner; Thomas	Halbert	3:18
9.	"Santa Baby"	Joan Javits; Philip Springer	Halbert	2:50
10.	"Santa, Can't You Hear Me" (with Ariana Grande)	Clarkson; Eubanks	Halbert	4:02
11.	"Last Christmas"	Michael	Halbert	3:09
12.	"Jingle Bell Rock"	Beal; Boothe	Shatkin	1:56
13.	"Blessed"	Robbins; Gad; Cohen	Halbert	3:34
14.	"Christmas Come Early"	Strand; Baker; Kestner; Lubben	Halbert	2:59
15.	"Under the Mistletoe" (with Brett Eldredge; Bonus track)	Clarkson; Eubanks	Eubanks; Shatkin	3:45
16.	"All I Want for Christmas Is You" (Bonus track)	Stone; Powers	Shatkin	3:46
17.	"Christmas Eve" (Bonus track)	Clarkson; Halbert	Halbert	3:00
Total length:				53:05

== Personnel ==
Credits adapted from the album's liner notes

Recorded and engineered at

- Brooklyn, New York (Brooklyn Bridge Music)
- Burbank, California (The Eastwood Stage at Warner Bros. Studio, The Listening Station, Glenwood Place Studios)
- Los Angeles, California (The Ribcage)
- Nashville, Tennessee (Ocean Way, Southern Ground)
- New York City (Manhattan Beach Recording)
- Pasadena, California (The Vibe Room)
- Studio City, California (Everland Studios)
- Universal City, California

Performance credits

- Kelly Clarkson – all vocals
- Jessi Collins – background vocals
- Luke Edgemon – background vocals
- Brett Eldredge – featured vocals
- Ariana Grande – featured vocals
- Nayanna Holley – background vocals
- Tiffany Palmer – background vocals
- Bridget Sarai – background vocals
- Chris Stapleton – featured vocals
- Brandon Winbush – background vocals

Musicians

- Isabel Bartles – violin
- Kevin Bate – cello
- Hari Bernstein – viola
- Idalynn Besser – viola
- Jenny Bifano – violin
- Charlie Bisharat – violin
- Laura Brenes – French horn
- Jimmy Bowland – saxophone
- Jaco Caraco – guitar
- Paul Cartwright – violin
- Bruce Christiansen – viola
- Leroy Clampitt – bass
- Stuart Clark – clarinet
- Ryan Cockman – violin
- Maria Conti – violin
- Mike Cordone – trumpet
- Phil Cornish – Hammond B3 organ
- Wade Culbreath – timpani
- Janet Darnall – violin
- Charles Dixon – viola
- Andrew Duckles – viol
- Timothy Eckert – bass
- Conni Ellisor – violin
- Alicia Enstrom – violin
- Lester Estelle – drums
- Aben Eubanks – bass, guitar, keyboards, percussion
- Leslie Fagan – flute
- Katelyn Faraudo – French horn
- Nicholas Gold – cello
- Ali Gooding – violin
- Erik Gratton – flute
- Gerald Greer – violin
- Jim Grosjean – viola
- Jason Halbert – Hammond B3 organ, keyboards, piano, programming
- Erin Hall – violin
- Dylan Hart – French horn
- Neel Hammond – violin
- Keyon Harrold – trumpet
- Amy Helman – violin
- Mark Hill – bass
- Luanne Homzy – violin
- Jack Jezserio – bass
- Tommy King – organ, piano
- Pete Korpela – percussion
- Jennifer Kummer – French horn
- Marisa Kunney – violin
- Anthony LaMarchina – cello
- Jules Levy – bass
- Keith Loftis – tenor saxophone
- Tim Loo – cello
- Lucia Micarelli – violin
- Camille Miller – violin
- Jeffrey Miller – trombone
- Jesse McGinty – saxophone
- Ray Montiero – trumpet
- Craig Nelson– bass
- Jenni Olsen – flute
- Alyssa Park – violin
- Anthony Parnther – bassoon
- Greg Phillinganes – piano
- Peter Povey – violin
- Linnea Powell – viola
- Aaron Redfield – drums, percussion
- Sari Reist – cello
- Danny Rivera – baritone saxophone
- Katty Rodriguez – baritone saxophone
- Rob Schaer – trumpet
- Erick Serna – guitar, ukulele
- Jesse Shatkin – drum programming, percussion, synthesizers
- Jung-Min Shin – violin
- Garrett Smith – trombone
- Vanessa Freebairn Smith – cello
- Ron Sorbo – timpani, percussion
- Anna Spina – French horn
- Marcus Strickland – tenor saxophone
- Luke Sullivant – guitar
- Amy Tatum – flute
- Charlie Tyler – cello
- Alan Umstead – violin
- Catherine Umstead – violin
- Mary Kathryn VanOsdale – violin
- Ina Veli – violin
- Diana Wade – violin
- Corey Wallace – trombone
- Bruce Wethey – violin
- Kyle Whalum – bass, upright bass
- Lara Wickes – oboe
- Karen Winklemann – violin
- Shu-Zheng – viola

Production

- BTW Productions – music preparation
- Drew Atz – brass recording
- Greg Gigendad Burke – art direction and design
- Nick Cazares – music librarian
- John Chapman – orchestra recording
- Nathan Cimino – engineer
- Anthony Circo – scoring coordinator
- Kelly Clarkson – executive producer
- Jessi Collins – vocal arrangements
- Mike Cordone – brass arrangement
- Danja – co-producer (track 6)
- Spencer Dennis – assistant
- John DeNosky – additional engineer, additional programming
- Sam Dent – engineer
- Jeff Fitzpatrick – pro tools operator
- Gloria Elias-Foeillet – makeup
- Chris Gehringer – mastering
- Serban Ghenea – mixing
- Jason Halbert – arrangement, producer
- Jennifer Hammond – additional orchestrations
- John Hanes – engineer
- Tom Hardisty – Eastwood Stage crew
- Keyon Harrold – brass arrangement
- Luanne Hornzy – concertmaster
- Jason Lazarus – additional arrangement
- Mark Lubetski – backline technician
- Craig Kallman – executive producer
- Whitney Martin – orchestra contractor
- Candace Lambert McAndrews – styling
- Jamie Olvera – Eastwood Stage crew
- Rachel Orscher – additional programming
- Tom Peltier – 2nd engineer
- Greg Phillinganes – arrangement
- Robert Ramos – hair
- Clark Rhea – additional arrangement
- Mark Ronson – producer
- Jesse Shatkin – engineer, producer
- Carter Smith – photography
- Nick Spezia – orchestra recording engineer
- Andy Taub – engineer
- Joseph Trapanese – orchestra arrangement, conductor, production
- Robert Venable – engineer
- Alan Umstead – orchestra contractor
- Sam Wahl – engineer
- Richard Wheeler, Jr. – Eastwood Stage crew
- Booker White – music preparation
- Shane Wilson – engineer
- Derek Zeoli – technical coordinato
- Ginna Zimmitti – orchestra contractor

== Charts ==
Chart performance for When Christmas Comes Around...
Chart (2021–2025)	Peak position
Australian Albums (ARIA)	61
Belgian Albums (Ultratop Flanders)	147
Canadian Albums (Billboard)	31
Dutch Albums (Album Top 100)	26
German Albums (Offizielle Top 100)	42
Hungarian Albums (MAHASZ)	23
Lithuanian Albums (AGATA)	58
New Zealand Albums (RMNZ)	19
Norwegian Albums (IFPI Norge)	55
Polish Streaming Albums (ZPAV)	67
Portuguese Streaming Albums (AFP)	160
Scottish Albums (Official Charts)	80
Swiss Albums (Schweizer Hitparade)	41
UK Albums (Official Charts)	94
US Billboard 200	22
US Top Holiday Albums (Billboard)	1

== Release history ==
When Christmas Comes Around... release history
Region	Date	Edition(s)	Format	Label	Catalog number	Ref.
Various	October 15, 2021	Standard	CD; digital download; streaming	Atlantic	864083-4	
Various	October 15, 2021	Standard	Christmas card CD	Atlantic	864006-3	
Various	November 1, 2024	When Christmas Comes Around... Again reissue	CD; digital download; streaming	Atlantic	860289-4	
