= The Best of Pentatonix Christmas =

Compilation album by Pentatonix
- Released: October 25, 2019
- Recorded: 2012–2018
- Genre: A cappella; Christmas
- Length: 63:00
- Label: RCA

Pentatonix chronology
Christmas Is Here! (2018)	The Best of Pentatonix Christmas (2019)	At Home EP (2020)

The Best of Pentatonix Christmas is the first compilation album by American a cappella group Pentatonix. It contains Christmas songs originally recorded for and included on their holiday albums PTXmas, That's Christmas to Me, A Pentatonix Christmas and Christmas Is Here!, as well as four new songs: "Do You Hear What I Hear?", "God Only Knows", "Joyful, Joyful", and "You're a Mean One, Mr. Grinch". It was released via RCA Records on October 25, 2019. In December 2019, the group toured the United States in support of the album.

== Track listing ==
1. "Deck the Halls" (solos by Scott Hoying, Mitch Grassi, and Kirstin Maldonado) – 2:46
2. "Carol of the Bells" (entirely lead sung by Mitch Grassi) – 3:15
3. "God Only Knows" (solos by Mitch Grassi, Scott Hoying, Kirstin Maldonado, Matt Sallee, and Kevin Olusola) – 2:48
4. "Hallelujah" (solos by Scott Hoying, Avi Kaplan, Kirstin Maldonado, and Mitch Grassi) – 4:29
5. "Dance of the Sugar Plum Fairy" – 2:07
6. "Mary, Did You Know?" (solos by Scott Hoying, Avi Kaplan, Kirstin Maldonado, Mitch Grassi, and Kevin Olusola) – 3:22
7. "Joyful Joyful" (featuring Jazmine Sullivan; solos by Jazmine Sullivan, Kevin Olusola, Matt Sallee, and Mitch Grassi) – 3:54
8. "Do You Hear What I Hear?" (featuring Whitney Houston; entirely lead sung by Whitney Houston) – 3:33
9. "Little Drummer Boy" (solos by Avi Kaplan, Scott Hoying, Mitch Grassi, Kirstin Maldonado, and Kevin Olusola) – 4:13
10. "God Rest Ye Merry Gentlemen" (solos by Mitch Grassi and Kirstin Maldonado) – 2:29
11. "Winter Wonderland/Don't Worry Be Happy" (featuring Tori Kelly; solos by Scott Hoying and Tori Kelly) – 3:27
12. "White Winter Hymnal" – 2:47
13. "Grown-Up Christmas List" (featuring Kelly Clarkson; entirely lead sung by Kelly Clarkson) – 4:42
14. "You're a Mean One, Mr. Grinch" (entirely lead sung by Matt Sallee) – 3:00
15. "When You Believe" (featuring Maren Morris; solos by Maren Morris and Scott Hoying) – 3:52
16. "Here Comes Santa Claus" (solos by Kirstin Maldonado, Scott Hoying, and Matt Sallee) – 2:36
17. "How Great Thou Art" (featuring Jennifer Hudson; solos by Jennifer Hudson and Scott Hoying) – 4:09
18. "That's Christmas to Me" (solos by Scott Hoying, Mitch Grassi, and Avi Kaplan) – 3:02
19. "Coldest Winter" (Bobby Alt Drum Mix; solos by Kirstin Maldonado and Mitch Grassi) – 2:28

== Personnel ==
- Scott Hoying – producer, baritone lead and backing vocals, and bass backing vocals on "You're a Mean One, Mr. Grinch"
- Mitch Grassi – producer, tenor lead and backing vocals
- Kirstin Maldonado – producer, soprano lead and backing vocals
- Matt Sallee – producer, bass lead and backing vocals, lead vocals on "You're a Mean One, Mr. Grinch", and rapping on "Joyful, Joyful"
- Kevin Olusola – producer, vocal percussion, beatboxing, tenor lead and backing vocals, lead vocals on "God Only Knows", and rapping on "Joyful, Joyful"

== Charts ==
=== Weekly charts ===
Chart (2019–2021)	Peak position
Australian Albums (ARIA)	25
Austrian Albums (Ö3 Austria)	17
Canadian Albums (Billboard)	21
Dutch Albums (Album Top 100)	55
German Albums (Offizielle Top 100)	88
Swiss Albums (Schweizer Hitparade)	56
UK Albums (OCC)	81
US Billboard 200	7
US Top Holiday Albums (Billboard)	1

=== Year-end charts ===
2020 year-end chart performance for The Best of Pentatonix Christmas
Chart (2020)	Position
US Billboard 200	158

2021 year-end chart performance for The Best of Pentatonix Christmas
Chart (2021)	Position
US Billboard 200	187

== See also ==
- List of Billboard Top Holiday Albums number ones of the 2010s
- List of Billboard Top Holiday Albums number ones of the 2020s
