= List of Billboard number one Holiday Songs 2001–2010 =

These are the Billboard Holiday Songs number one hits from the chart's debut on December 8, 2001 until January 8, 2011. The survey of radio airplay of Adult Contemporary and Adult Top 40 stations is published seasonally for 5-6 weeks after Thanksgiving. When the Holiday 100 was launched on December 10, 2011, the chart was renamed Holiday Airplay. Since December 4, 2010, only Brenda Lee's "Rockin' Around the Christmas Tree", Burl Ives' "A Holly Jolly Christmas", Jose Feliciano's "Feliz Navidad" (1970) and Mariah Carey's "All I Want for Christmas Is You" have alternated the #1 position.

Issue date	Title	Artist	Released	Ref.
December 8, 2001	"Celebrate Me Home"	Kenny Loggins	1977	
December 15, 2001	"Rockin' Around the Christmas Tree"	Brenda Lee	1958	
December 22, 2001	"Jingle Bell Rock"	Bobby Helms	1957	
December 7, 2002	"The Gift"	Jim Brickman Featuring Collin Raye & Susan Ashton	1999	
December 14, 2002	"Jingle Bell Rock"	Bobby Helms	1957	
December 21, 2002	"Jingle Bell Rock"	Bobby Helms	1957	
December 28, 2002	"Jingle Bell Rock"	Bobby Helms	1957	
January 4, 2003	"Jingle Bell Rock"	Bobby Helms	1957	
January 11, 2003	"Jingle Bell Rock"	Bobby Helms	1957	
December 6, 2003	"Peace (Where The Heart is)"	Jim Brickman Featuring Collin Raye	2003	
December 13, 2003	"Rockin' Around The Christmas Tree"	Brenda Lee	1958	
December 20, 2003	"Merry Christmas Darling"	The Carpenters	1970	
December 27, 2003	"Rockin' Around The Christmas Tree"	Brenda Lee	1958	
January 3, 2004	"Rockin' Around The Christmas Tree"	Brenda Lee	1958	
January 10, 2004	"A Holly Jolly Christmas"	Burl Ives	1964	
December 4, 2004	"The Christmas Song (Merry Christmas To You)"	Nat King Cole	1946	
December 11, 2004	"Rockin' Around The Christmas Tree"	Brenda Lee	1958	
December 18, 2004	"A Holly Jolly Christmas"	Burl Ives	1964	
December 25, 2004	"Rockin' Around The Christmas Tree"	Brenda Lee	1958	
January 1, 2005	"Rockin' Around The Christmas Tree"	Brenda Lee	1958	
January 8, 2005	"A Holly Jolly Christmas"	Burl Ives	1964	
December 3, 2005	"A Holly Jolly Christmas"	Burl Ives	1964	
December 10, 2005	"A Holly Jolly Christmas"	Burl Ives	1964	
December 17, 2005	"Rockin' Around The Christmas Tree"	Brenda Lee	1958	
December 24, 2005	"The Christmas Song (Merry Christmas To You)"	Nat King Cole	1946	
December 31, 2005	"A Holly Jolly Christmas"	Burl Ives	1964	
January 7, 2006	"A Holly Jolly Christmas"	Burl Ives	1964	
November 25, 2006	"The Christmas Song (Merry Christmas To You)"	Nat King Cole	1946	
December 2, 2006	"A Holly Jolly Christmas"	Burl Ives	1964	
December 9, 2006	"Rockin' Around The Christmas Tree"	Brenda Lee	1958	
December 16, 2006	"Rockin' Around The Christmas Tree"	Brenda Lee	1958	
December 23, 2006	"A Holly Jolly Christmas"	Burl Ives	1964	
December 30, 2006	"Rockin' Around The Christmas Tree"	Brenda Lee	1958	
January 6, 2007	"A Holly Jolly Christmas"	Burl Ives	1964	
January 13, 2007	"The Christmas Song (Merry Christmas To You)"	Nat King Cole	1946	
November 17, 2007	"The Christmas Song (Merry Christmas To You)"	Nat King Cole	1946	
November 24, 2007	"A Holly Jolly Christmas"	Burl Ives	1964	
December 15, 2007	"Jingle Bell Rock"	Bobby Helms	1957	
December 22, 2007	"Rockin' Around The Christmas Tree"	Brenda Lee	1958	
December 29, 2007	"The Christmas Song (Merry Christmas To You)"	Nat King Cole	1946	
January 5, 2008	"Rockin' Around The Christmas Tree"	Brenda Lee	1958	
January 12, 2008	"White Christmas"	Bing Crosby	1942	
November 22, 2008	"Rockin' Around The Christmas Tree"	Brenda Lee	1958	
November 29, 2008	"Rockin' Around The Christmas Tree"	Brenda Lee	1958	
December 6, 2008	"Rockin' Around The Christmas Tree"	Brenda Lee	1958	
December 13, 2008	"All I Want For Christmas Is You"	Mariah Carey	1995	
December 20, 2008	"Rockin' Around The Christmas Tree"	Brenda Lee	1958	
December 27, 2008	"Rockin' Around The Christmas Tree"	Brenda Lee	1958	
January 3, 2009	"A Holly Jolly Christmas"	Burl Ives	1964	
January 10, 2009	"Rockin' Around The Christmas Tree"	Brenda Lee	1958	
January 21, 2009	"All I Want For Christmas Is You"	Mariah Carey	1995	
November 28, 2009	"A Holly Jolly Christmas"	Burl Ives	1964	
December 5, 2009	"Rockin' Around The Christmas Tree"	Brenda Lee	1958	
December 12, 2009	"A Holly Jolly Christmas"	Burl Ives	1964	
December 19, 2009	"Rockin' Around The Christmas Tree"	Brenda Lee	1958	
December 26, 2009	"A Holly Jolly Christmas"	Burl Ives	1964	
January 2, 2010	"A Holly Jolly Christmas"	Burl Ives	1964	
November 27, 2010	"Jingle Bell Rock"	Bobby Helms	1957	
December 4, 2010	"All I Want For Christmas Is You"	Mariah Carey	1995	
December 11, 2010	"All I Want For Christmas Is You"	Mariah Carey	1995	
December 18, 2010	"Rockin' Around The Christmas Tree"	Brenda Lee	1958	
December 25, 2010	"A Holly Jolly Christmas"	Burl Ives	1964	
January 1, 2011	"All I Want For Christmas Is You"	Mariah Carey	1995	
January 8, 2011	"All I Want For Christmas Is You"	Mariah Carey	1995	

== See also ==
- Billboard Christmas Holiday Charts
- List of Billboard number one Holiday Digital Song Sales 2010-2019
- List of Billboard Top Holiday Albums number ones of the 2000s
