= Barbara Ann =

1961 single by the Regents

"Barbara-Ann"
- Side A of the US single

Single by the Regents

from the album Barbara-Ann
- B-side: "I'm So Lonely"
- Released: March 1961
- Recorded: 1958
- Genre: Doo-wop; rock and roll
- Length: 2:15
- Label: Gee
- Songwriter: Fred Fassert
- Producer: Louis Cicchetti

The Regents singles chronology
"Barbara-Ann" (1961)	"Runaround" (1961)

"Barbara Ann" is a song written by Fred Fassert that was first recorded by American doo-wop vocal group the Regents as "Barbara-Ann". Their version was released in 1961 and reached No.13 on the Billboard Hot 100 chart. A more well-known version of the song was recorded by the Beach Boys for their 1965 in-house live album Beach Boys' Party! In December, "Barbara Ann" was issued as a single with the B-side "Girl Don't Tell Me", peaking at No. 2 in the U.S. and No. 3 in the UK.

The Regents' original version was featured in the 1973 film American Graffiti and later included on the soundtrack album. The Regents' version was ranked number 986 among the greatest singles ever made in Dave Marsh's book The Heart of Rock & Soul (1989).

== The Beach Boys version ==
"Barbara Ann"
- US picture sleeve

Single by the Beach Boys

from the album Beach Boys' Party!
- B-side: "Girl Don't Tell Me"
- Released: December 20, 1965
- Recorded: September 23, 1965
- Studio: Western, Hollywood
- Genre: Rock and roll; doo-wop; surf rock
- Length: 2:05 (single edit); 3:23 (album version)
- Label: Capitol
- Songwriter: Fred Fassert
- Producer: Brian Wilson

The Beach Boys singles chronology
"The Little Girl I Once Knew" (1965)	"Barbara Ann" (1965)	"Sloop John B" (1966)

Licensed audio
- "Barbara Ann" on YouTube

The Beach Boys recorded their version in 1965. Dean Torrence of Jan and Dean is featured on lead vocals along with Brian Wilson. Torrence is not credited on the album, but Carl Wilson is heard saying "Thanks, Dean" at the song's conclusion. Capitol's Al Coury rush-released "Barbara Ann" as a single without informing the band, after the relatively poor performance of the group's previous disc, "The Little Girl I Once Knew".

The song entered the Billboard Hot 100 chart the week ending January 1, 1966. The week ending January 29, the song leaped from No. 15 to No. 2 and was in position to replace "We Can Work It Out" by the Beatles as the next No. 1 song. However, "My Love" by Petula Clark unexpectedly vaulted into the No. 1 position the week ending February 5, 1966. Consequently, "Barbara Ann" peaked at No. 2 on the US Billboard Hot 100 (No. 1 in Cash Box and Record World) and at No. 3 in the UK in January 1966. It also topped the charts in Germany, Switzerland and Norway. It was the Beach Boys' biggest hit in Italy, reaching No. 4.

Cash Box said the Beach Boys apply a "distinctive, easy-going style complete with plenty harmony and counterpoint portions". Record World called it a "sweet Beach Boy tribute" to "that certain girl".

Variations of the Beach Boys' version of the song have been released. A version without the party sound effects can be found on the Hawthorne, CA album. The group sang the song as an encore on their Live in London album. As a solo artist, Brian has a rendition on his live album Live at the Roxy Theatre, and in 2001 performed it himself, with the ensemble, on An All-Star Tribute to Brian Wilson.

In 1987, the group re-recorded the song as "Here Come the Cubs" with re-written lyrics about the Chicago Cubs. It became the team's official theme that year, replacing "Go, Cubs, Go".

=== Personnel ===
- Brian Wilson - lead vocals, bass
- Al Jardine & Carl Wilson - backing vocals, guitars
- Bruce Johnston, Mike Love, Dennis Wilson - backing vocals

==== Guests ====
- Dean Torrence - lead vocals

== Other notable versions ==
The Who recorded "Barbara Ann" on the Ready Steady Who EP in 1966.

The song was performed live on 27 July 1977 in rehearsals at Shepperton Studios for the film The Kids Are Alright with Keith Moon on vocals. Moon, a massive Beach Boys fan but a notoriously limited singer, plays and sings, much to the delight of his fellow band members.

== "Bomb Iran" ==
The song was parodied as "Bomb Iran" by various musicians, including Vince Vance and the Valiants, during the 1979 Iran hostage crisis.

On April 17, 2007, at an appearance in Murrells Inlet, South Carolina during the 2008 presidential election campaign, U.S. Senator John McCain responded to a question from an audience member about military action against Iran by referring to "That old, eh, that old Beach Boys song, 'Bomb Iran'," and then singing the parody chorus, "Bomb, bomb, bomb, bomb, anyway, ah ..."

== Charts ==
Weekly charts

Beach Boys version
Chart (1965–66)	Peak position
Australia	2
Austrian Singles Chart	1
Belgium (Ultratop 50 Flanders)	11
Belgium (Ultratop 50 Wallonia)	33
Canada RPM Top Singles	2
Dutch Singles Chart	17
Finland (Soumen Virallinen)	19
German Singles Chart	2
Ireland (IRMA)	7
New Zealand (Listener)	3
Norwegian Singles Chart	1
South Africa (Springbok Radio SA Top 20)	2
UK Singles Chart	3
US Billboard Hot 100	2
US Cash Box Top 100	1
West Germany (GfK)	2

Year-end charts

Beach Boys version
Chart (1966)	Rank
US Billboard Hot 100	79
US Cash Box Top 100	44

== Certifications ==
Certifications for "Barbara Ann"
Region	Certification	Certified units/sales
United States (RIAA)	Platinum	1,000,000^{‡}
^{^} Shipments figures based on certification alone.^{‡} Sales+streaming figures based on certification alone.
