= The Regents (British band) =

Former British band

The Regents were a British new wave band that had a hit with the song "7 Teen" in 1979, which reached No. 11 in the UK Singles Chart. In June 1980, "See You Later" peaked at No. 55.

The group consisted of Bic Brack, Katherine Best, Damian Pew and Martin Sheller.

== Discography ==
=== Singles ===
- "7 Teen", released November 1979
- "See You Later", released May 1980
- "Ride Cowboy Ride", released April 1981
- "Just A Little" released December 1980
