= Robert Venable =

- Birth name: Robert Venable
- Born: October 3, 1981 (age 43)
- Origin: Silver Spring, Maryland, United States
- Genres: Pop; rock; indie; contemporary Christian music
- Website: robertvenable.com

Robert Venable is a four-time Emmy Award winning producer, mixer, engineer, and drummer for As We Ascend currently based in Nashville, Tennessee. He is the music mixer for The Kelly Clarkson Show.

== Biography ==
Growing up in Springdale, Arkansas, Robert Venable performed in several bands and eventually made the decision to pursue a career in music. He attended the Conservatory of Recording Arts and Sciences in Tempe, Arizona, where he graduated top of his class. While in school, Venable interned at several studios in the Phoenix metropolitan area, such as The Saltmine Studios and Phase Four, making the transition from assisting to engineering. In 2005, he was hired as head engineer at Paradise West Recording Studios in Scottsdale, Arizona. In 2009, Venable relocated to Nashville, Tennessee and worked in various studios as he built his own. Venable has mixed, engineered, and/or produced music for musicians in a variety of genres. Venable currently resides in Franklin, Tennessee and works out of Off The Wall Studios, his private recording studio, where he produces, mixes and is involved in artist development. In 2012, Venable made an appearance, portraying himself as a producer, in the pilot episode of the American musical drama television series, Nashville.

== Selected works ==
Venable has worked on several recordings. The following is a select list of notable recordings on which he has worked.

Year	Work	Artist or band	Role
2015	Piece by Piece	Kelly Clarkson	audio engineer
2016	TOPxMM	Twenty One Pilots	audio engineer
2021	When Christmas Comes Around...	Kelly Clarkson	audio engineer
2022	Kellyoke	Kelly Clarkson	audio engineer

== Affiliated studios ==
Current

- Off the Wall Recording Studios (Nashville, Tennessee) - 2009–present (owner)
- FIVE Studios (Nashville, Tennessee) - 2018–present (owner)

Former

- Phase Four (Tempe, Arizona)
- The Saltmine (Mesa, Arizona)
- Paradise West Recording Studio (Scottsdale, Arizona)
- The Givens House (Franklin, Tennessee)
