= Under the Mistletoe (song) =

2020 single by Kelly Clarkson and Brett Eldredge

Single by Kelly Clarkson and Brett Eldredge
- Released: October 28, 2020
- Recorded: 2020
- Studio: The Ribcage (Los Angeles, CA); Brooklyn Bridge Music (Brooklyn, NY); Everland Studios (Studio City, CA)
- Genre: Pop
- Length: 3:45
- Label: Atlantic
- Songwriters: Kelly Clarkson; Aben Eubanks
- Producers: Aben Eubanks; Jesse Shatkin

Kelly Clarkson singles chronology
"I Dare You" (2020)	"Under the Mistletoe" (2020)	"All I Want for Christmas Is You" (2020)

Brett Eldredge singles chronology
"Gabrielle" (2020)	"Under the Mistletoe" (2020)	"Good Day" (2021)

"Under the Mistletoe" is a duet by American singers Kelly Clarkson and Brett Eldredge. It was written by Clarkson and Aben Eubanks, who co-produced it with Jesse Shatkin. "Under the Mistletoe" was first issued by Atlantic Records on October 28, 2020. The song is also included on Clarkson's second Christmas album, When Christmas Comes Around... (2021).

== Composition and reception ==
"Under the Mistletoe" is a Christmas pop song written by Clarkson and Aben Eubanks, who produced the track with longtime collaborator Jesse Shatkin. Clarkson invited Eldredge to record the song with her, saying that she was "impressed by his classic sound on his Christmas record so it was a perfect match." Eldredge immediately accepted the invitation, and remarked, "I was blown away by the soul and joy that it brought into my life the moment I heard it."

Reviewing the track for Vulture, Rebecca Alter opined that the song may not be the best Clarkson Christmas song, but that it was "very good as well, going for that throwback, A Christmas Gift for You from Phil Spector sound that most Christmas songs have if they want to signal that they're "Christmas!"". George Griffiths of the Official Charts Company opined that the track "packs enough pep to take you all the way through to the big day." In 2024 Billboard ranked the song 18th on the "Best New Christmas Songs of the 21st Century" list.

== Music video ==
The accompanying music video premiered on December 10, 2020, and was directed by Jay Martin. The video is a cartoon animated by Ingenuity Studios.

== Personnel ==
Credits adapted from Spotify metadata.

- Vocals – Kelly Clarkson
- Vocals – Brett Eldredge
- Drums – Aaron Redfield
- Engineer, guitar, keyboards, producer – Aben Eubanks
- Engineer – Andy Taub
- Masterer – Chris Gehringer
- Ukulele – Erick Serna
- Trombone – Jeffery Miller
- Bass, keyboards, engineer, producer, additional and drum programming – Jesse Shatkin
- Engineer – John Hanes
- Baritone saxophone – Katty Rodriguez
- Brass arrangement, trumpet – Keyon Harrold
- Tenor saxophone – Marcus Strickland
- Additional engineer, strings programming – Sam Dent
- Assistant engineer – Sam Wahl
- Mixer – Serban Ghenea

== Charts ==
=== Weekly charts ===
Weekly chart performance for "Under the Mistletoe"
Chart (2020–2022)	Peak position
Canada Hot 100 (Billboard)	68
Canada AC (Billboard)	1
Ireland (IRMA)	58
Global 200 (Billboard)	121
UK Singles (Official Charts)	61
US Billboard Hot 100	59
US Adult Contemporary (Billboard)	9
US Hot Country Songs (Billboard)	10
US Holiday 100 (Billboard)	34
US Rolling Stone Top 100	45

=== Year-end charts ===
Year-end chart performance for "Under the Mistletoe"
Chart (2021)	Position
US Adult Contemporary (Billboard)	46
US Hot Country Songs (Billboard)	96

== Release history ==
Release history for "Under the Mistletoe"
Region	Date	Format	Label	Catalog number	Ref.
Various	October 28, 2020	Digital download	Atlantic	USAT22006597	

== See also ==
- Wrapped in Red
- Glow
- "Christmas Eve"
