= All I Want for Christmas Is You (Vince Vance & the Valiants song) =

1989 popular song

Single by Vince Vance & the Valiants

from the album All I Want for Christmas Is You
- B-side: "Exceptional Man"
- Released: 1989
- Studio: Masterphonics Studio 6; Nashville, Tennessee
- Genre: Country; Christmas
- Length: 3:47
- Label: Valiant 92689
- Songwriters: Troy Powers; Andy Stone
- Producers: Ed Loftus; James Stroud

Vince Vance & the Valiants singles chronology
"Bomb Iran" (1980)	"All I Want for Christmas Is You" (1989)	"All I Want for Christmas Is You (re-issue)" (1993)

"All I Want for Christmas Is You" is a Christmas song recorded by American novelty act Vince Vance & the Valiants. Initially released as a single in 1989, Vince Vance's version of the song has charted several times on the Billboard country singles charts. It is one of two records to chart for Vince Vance & the Valiants, the other being "Bomb Iran".

== Content ==
"All I Want for Christmas Is You" is a mid-tempo in compound duple meter, featuring lead vocals from Lisa Burgess Stewart, who now records under the name Lisa Layne. In it, the singer explains that she does not want Christmas decorations nor gifts from Santa Claus. Instead, all she wants for Christmas is her lover. The melody used in the song is based on Bobby Vinton's number 9 pop hit single from early 1964, "My Heart Belongs to Only You", with a few minor alterations.

== Reception ==
In his review of the album All I Want for Christmas Is You, AllMusic reviewer Jason Birchmeier referred to the song as a "holiday favorite within the country community during the '90s" but noted that the rest of the album was not "remotely worth bothering with."

Having received frequent rotation on country radio and adult contemporary radio during the Christmas season since its 1993 re-release, "All I Want for Christmas Is You" is also the most-played country music Christmas song.

The song was also made into a music video directed by Steve Dunning for Aries Productions, located in Arlington, Texas.

== Lawsuit ==
On June 3, 2022, Andy Stone, who portrayed Vince Vance, filed a copyright lawsuit against Mariah Carey, alleging that she "exploited" and made "undeserved profits" off his song with her song "All I Want for Christmas Is You", which was published five years after his. The lawsuit was dropped without prejudice in November 2022; Stone re-filed the lawsuit in November 2023. In March 2025, U.S. District Judge Mónica Ramírez Almadani ruled in Carey's favor, saying that Stone had failed to prove the two songs were "substantially similar" and that he and his attorneys made frivolous arguments; she also ordered Stone and his lawyers to pay part of Carey's legal fees.

== Chart performance ==
The song first charted in early 1994 based on airplay from the 1993 Christmas season, peaking at number 55 on the Billboard Hot Country Singles & Tracks (now Hot Country Songs) chart on the week of January 8, 1994. It re-entered the same chart in December 1994, reaching a new peak of number 52 on the week of January 7, 1995. The song re-entered the Billboard country singles chart again every January afterward, each time peaking higher than the last; it did not chart in the 1998-1999 holiday season but charted again for the final time in January 2000, reaching its overall peak position on the country singles chart of number 31. Although it never made the country singles chart again, it peaked at number 23 on the Billboard Hot 100 Recurrent Airplay chart in 2002 (despite having never entered or bubbled under the Billboard Hot 100 or Hot 100 Airplay charts), and has re-appeared on the Hot Country Recurrents chart every Christmas since late 2000/early 2001.

Chart performance for "All I Want for Christmas Is You"
Chart (1994–2002)	Peak position
US Billboard Hot Country Singles & Tracks	31
US Billboard Hot 100 Recurrent Airplay	23

== Other versions ==
On November 14, 2020, Kelly Clarkson released a version of the song as a standalone single under the Atlantic Records label. The version peaked at number 30 on the Billboard Canada AC chart on the week ending December 26, 2020. She also later included it on her 2021 album, When Christmas Comes Around...

In 2004, LeAnn Rimes released a version of the song on her 2004 album What a Wonderful World. A new Single Mix was released in 2025 from her Greatest Hits Christmas compilation. On Billboard charts, the Single Mix peaked at number nine on the Adult Contemporary chart on the week ending January 3, 2026, and number 35 on the Adult Pop Airplay chart on the week ending December 27, 2025.
