= Vince Vance & the Valiants =

American musical group

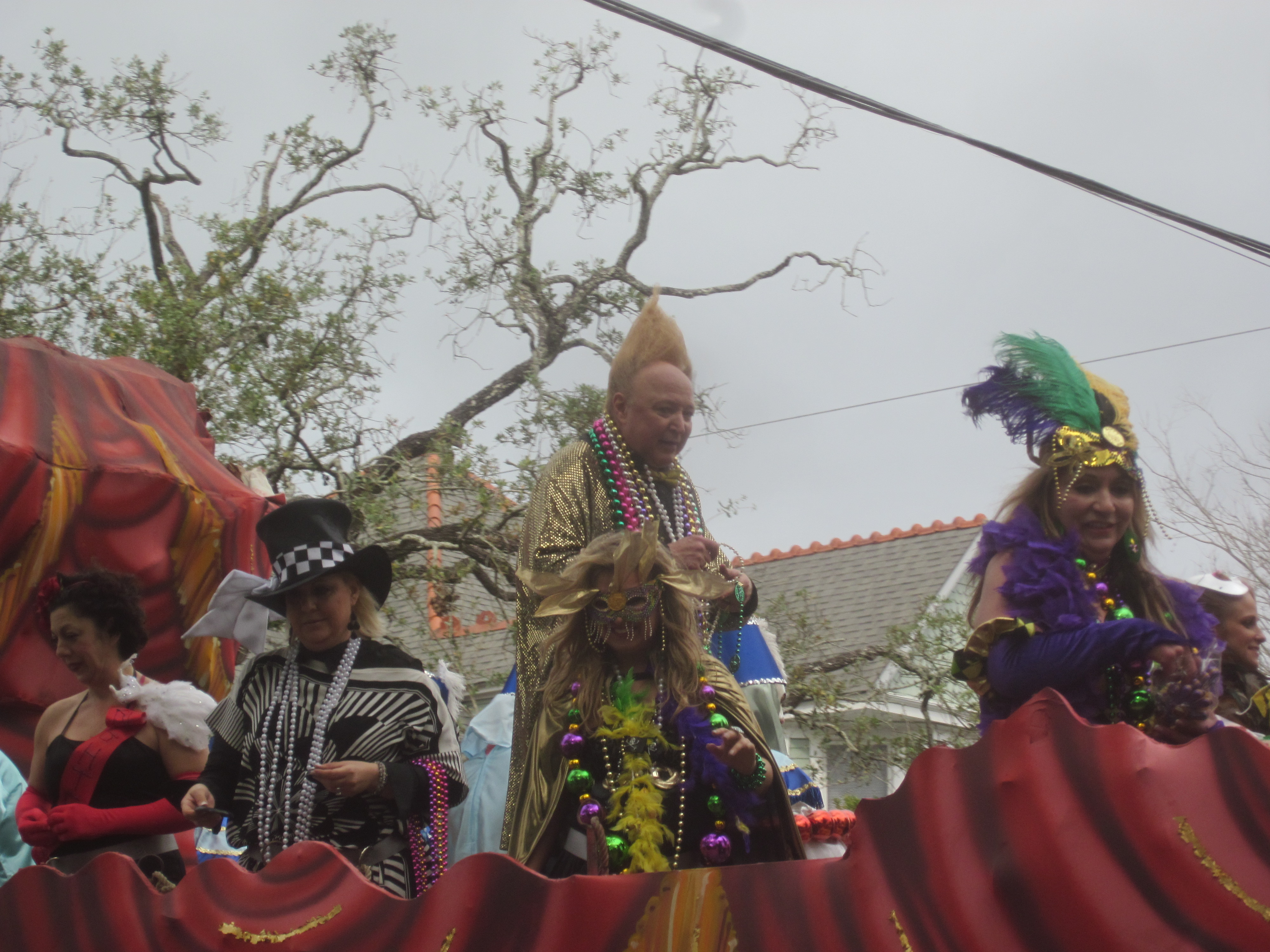
- Vince Vance with distinctive upswept hair, on a float in a 2013 New Orleans Mardi Gras parade

Background information
- Origin: New Orleans, Louisiana, United States
- Genres: Country pop; rock and roll; novelty; adult contemporary
- Years active: 1971–present
- Labels: Malaco; Waldoxy
- Members: Vince Vance (Andy Stone)
- Website: http://www.vincevance.com/

Vince Vance & the Valiants are an American country pop, rock and roll and novelty musical group from New Orleans, Louisiana, United States. The title character Vince Vance is portrayed by Andy Stone, the only permanent member of the group. He was born Andrew John Franichevich Jr. The remainder of the Valiants (or, if female, Valiantettes) are rotating musicians.

The group's most sustained hit record, and one that is uncharacteristic of their usual stylings, is the country ballad "All I Want for Christmas Is You", which charted on the Billboard Hot Country Songs charts on six occasions in the 1990s. As a novelty band, their best-known record was their 1980 version of the parody song "Bomb Iran", which narrowly missed the Billboard Hot 100 in 1981.

On November 20, 2010, Vince Vance was surprised during his performance at a "Louisiana Legends" fundraiser at New Orleans Rock'n Bowl venue, with induction into the Louisiana Music Hall of Fame for his outstanding career, including the Christmas song "All I Want for Christmas is You" and his 2010 "I Am New Orleans".

== Discography ==
=== Albums ===
Title	Album details
All I Want for Christmas Is You	Release date: 1989; Label: Waldoxy Records
I Know What It Means to Miss New Orleans	Release date: February 20, 1996; Label: Waldoxy Records
Tamale Wagon	Release date: August 18, 1998; Label: Waldoxy Records
We Don't Run	Release date: April 8, 2003; Label: Waldoxy Records

=== Singles ===
Year	Single	Peak chart positions		Album
Year	Single	US Country	US Bubbling	Album
1980	"Bomb Iran"	—	101	single only (Paid Records)
1989	"All I Want for Christmas Is You"	—	—	single only (Valiant Records)
1993	"All I Want for Christmas Is You" (re-release)	55	—	All I Want for Christmas Is You (Waldoxy Records)
1994	"All I Want for Christmas Is You" (re-entry)	52	—	All I Want for Christmas Is You (Waldoxy Records)
1995	"All I Want for Christmas Is You" (re-entry)	52	—	All I Want for Christmas Is You (Waldoxy Records)
1996	"All I Want for Christmas Is You" (re-entry)	49	—	All I Want for Christmas Is You (Waldoxy Records)
1997	"All I Want for Christmas Is You" (re-entry)	43	—	All I Want for Christmas Is You (Waldoxy Records)
1999	"All I Want for Christmas Is You" (re-entry)	31	—	All I Want for Christmas Is You (Waldoxy Records)
2006	"I Am New Orleans"	—	—	I Know What It Means to Miss New Orleans (Waldoxy Records)
"—" denotes releases that did not chart

=== Music videos ===
Year	Video	Director
1989	"All I Want for Christmas Is You"	Steve Dunning
