= List of productions impacted by the 2023 Writers Guild of America strike =

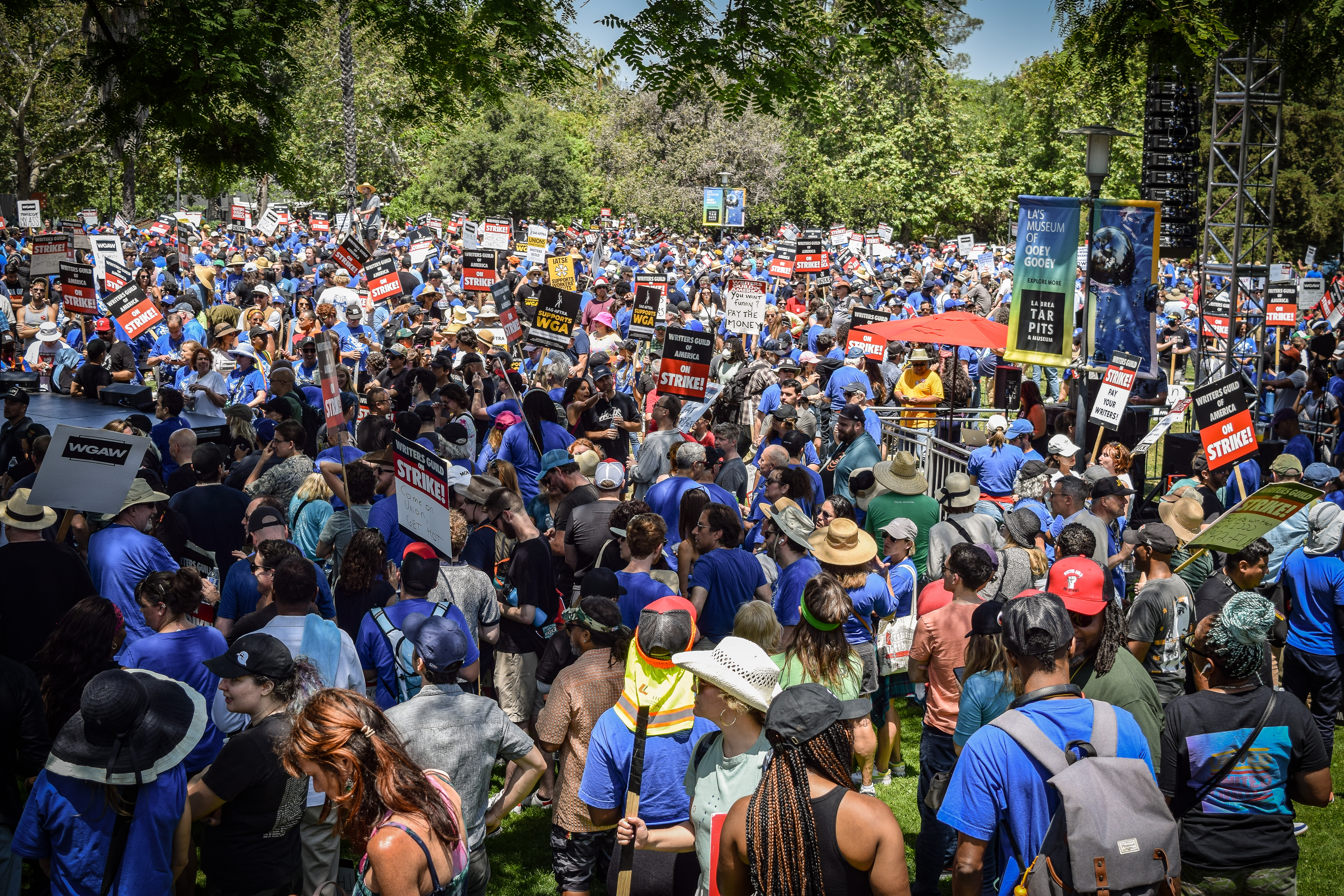
A crowd of WGA and SAG-AFTRA members strike in Los Angeles on June 21, 2023.

The 2023 Writers Guild of America strike had a significant impact on the film and television industries of the United States, causing many film and television projects to shut down or postpone production. It is the largest interruption to American film and television production since the COVID-19 pandemic in 2020, as well as the largest labor stoppage for the Writers Guild of America (WGA) since the 2007–08 strike.

On July 14, 2023, SAG-AFTRA joined the WGA in its own strike, halting production on any remaining film or television series that previously had continued during the WGA strike. On September 24, 2023, the WGA suspended picketing upon reaching a tentative agreement. Following a vote, the union leadership voted to end the strike on September 27, 2023, at 12:01 a.m. PDT.

The SAG-AFTRA strike ended on November 9, 2023, at 12:01 a.m. PDT.

== Productions affected ==
=== Award shows ===
Project	Network	Notes	Ref.
14th Governors Awards	—N/a	Ceremony postponed to January 9, 2024	
16th Television Academy Honors	—N/a	Ceremony canceled by the Academy of Television Arts & Sciences	
39th TCA Awards	—N/a	Ceremony canceled by the Television Critics Association; winners announced via press release on August 7, 2023. Media tour prior to the ceremony also cancelled.	
49th AFI Life Achievement Award tribute for Nicole Kidman	TNT	Ceremony postponed to April 27, 2024, by the American Film Institute	
50th Daytime Emmy Awards	CBS	Ceremony delayed to December 15, 2023	
75th Primetime Creative Arts Emmy Awards	FXX	Ceremony delayed to January 6 and 7, 2024	
75th Primetime Emmy Awards	Fox	Ceremony delayed to January 15, 2024	
76th Tony Awards	CBS	Ceremony commenced without writers or written material (in reference to the strike, the ceremony featured an opening number with a blank book and no lyrics); the WGA denied a waiver, but committed to not picketing the ceremony	
76th Writers Guild of America Awards	—N/a	Ceremony postponed to April 14, 2024	
83rd Peabody Awards	—N/a	In-person ceremony canceled	
2023 ESPY Awards	ABC	Ceremony commenced without a host for the first time	
2023 MTV Movie & TV Awards	MTV	Televised in-person ceremony canceled following the withdrawal of host Drew Barrymore and other presenters in solidarity. Replaced by a broadcast-only virtual ceremony with no host.	
2023 MTV Video Music Awards	MTV	Ceremony commenced without written work	
BET Awards 2023	BET	Ceremony commenced without writers or written material	
Humanitas Prize	—N/a	Award ceremony cancelled; prizes announced in the newspaper; in-person gathering scheduled for November 2	
PEN America's Business Visionary Award for Ted Sarandos	—N/a	Other honoree Lorne Michaels still to be presented with the PEN/Audible Literary Service Award	
Young Artist Award 2023	—N/a	Postponed	

=== Festivals and conventions ===
Project	Notes	Ref.
27th American French Film Festival	Festival cancelled	
46th Mill Valley Film Festival	Adapted to not have promotion from struck companies	
76th Locarno Film Festival	Opening award cancelled; opening ceremony schedules modified; numerous producers pulled out	
2023 Fan Expo Canada	Minor changes in promotion and presentation	
2023 Just for Laughs Comedy Festival - Montreal	Numerous panels from struck companies cancelled	
2023 San Diego Comic-Con	Multiple studios pulled out; in addition, WGA members were unable to participate in panels	
2023 Toronto International Film Festival	Promotion on projects produced by struck companies removed; most projects presented are independent or international	
Adult Swim Festival 2023	Numerous events, including meet and greets cancelled; schedule revised	
ATX Television Festival Season 12	Numerous panels cancelled; "WGA on Strike!" panel added	
De Niro Con at Tribeca Festival	Postponed until June 2024	
GalaxyCon Austin	Commenced without planned promotion of work from struck companies	
Pennsylvania Warhorse Film Festival	Event postponed until 2024	
SeriesFest Season 9	Numerous showcases cancelled; many screenings went on without panels	
Vancouver International Film Festival 2023	Minor changes due to 10% of the festival involving US based films	

=== Films ===
The following section lists theatrical and direct-to-streaming films.

Film	Distributor	Notes	Ref.
Anniversary	Lionsgate	Script completed at time of strike; production later suspended by 2023 SAG-AFTRA strike; later granted waiver to resume filming, which wrapped on August 28	
Avatar: Fire and Ash	Disney	Premiere pushed to December 2025	
Avatar 4	Disney	Premiere pushed to December 2029	
Avatar 5	Disney	Premiere pushed to December 2031	
Avengers: Doomsday	Disney	Premiere pushed to 2026	
Avengers: Secret Wars	Disney	Premiere pushed to 2027	
Average Height, Average Build	Netflix	Production postponed; later scrapped	
The Batman: Part II	Warner Bros.	Filming postponed until 2024	
Best Served Cold	TBA	Script writing paused	
Blade	Disney	Pre-production paused ahead of a planned filming start in June 2023; premiere delayed indefinitely after director Yann Demange left the project and later got cancelled	
Captain America: Brave New World	Disney	Premiere pushed to February 2025	
Challengers	Metro-Goldwyn-Mayer	Premiere pushed to April 2024	
Cleopatra	Universal Pictures	Script production postponed for duration of the strike	
Community: The Movie	Peacock	Script partially completed prior to the strike, completed in February 2024; filming expected to begin in 2025	
Dune: Part Two	Warner Bros.	Premiere pushed to March 2024	
El Muerto	Sony	Bad Bunny, who was set to star, left the project; film scrapped in December 2024	
The Fantastic Four: First Steps	Disney	Premiere pushed to May 2025, later pushed to July 2025	
Fast Forever	Universal	Pre-production suspended	
Force of Nature: The Dry 2	Roadshow Films	Premiere delayed	
Freakier Friday	Disney	Early development paused	
G20	Amazon	Production paused when Viola Davis declined to move forward with production for the duration of the strike	
Ghostbusters: Frozen Empire	Sony	Release postponed to March 2024	
Godzilla x Kong: The New Empire	Warner Bros.	Premiere delayed to March 29, 2024	
Good Fortune	Lionsgate	Filming canceled by picketing on May 16–17, 2023, before being suspended indefinitely	
Gran Turismo	Sony	Premiere pushed to late August 2023	
How to Train Your Dragon	Universal	Production suspended	
I Am film	The CW	Premiere delayed	
The Island	TBA	Production shuttered due to inability to obtain insurance with the WGA and impending SAG-AFTRA strike	
It Ends with Us	Sony	Filming suspended; resumed in January 2024	
John Mulaney: Baby J	Netflix	Release unaffected (released April 2023, prior to the strike); subsequent For Your Consideration screening and panel at Netflix FYSEE cancelled	
Karate Kid: Legends	Sony	Premiere pushed to December 2024; later pushed to May 2025	
King Spawn	Blumhouse Productions	Scriptwriting paused for the duration of the strike	
Kraven the Hunter	Sony	Premiere pushed to August 2024, later pushed to December 2024	
The Lord of the Rings: The War of the Rohirrim	Warner Bros.	Premiere pushed to December 2024	
The Mandalorian and Grogu	Disney	Premiere pushed to May 2026	
The Movie Critic	Sony	Production postponed; later scrapped	
My Ex-Friend's Wedding	Sony	Production suspended	
Poor Things	Disney	Premiere pushed to December 2023	
Problemista	A24	Premiere delayed to March 1, 2024	
Scream 7	Paramount	Pre-production suspended	
Shelby Oaks	Paper Street Pictures	Post-production suspended	
Spider-Man: Beyond the Spider-Verse	Sony	Premiere delayed to June 2027, production resumed in December 2023	
Spider-Man: Brand New Day	Sony	Developmental writing was halted; resumed upon the conclusion of the strike	
Still: A Michael J. Fox Movie	Apple TV+	Premiere delayed to May 12, 2023	
Strays	Universal	Release postponed	
Superman	Warner Bros.	Filmmaker James Gunn suspended writing for the duration of the strike	
The Super Mario Galaxy Movie	Universal	Production suspended, resumed when the strike ended and finally announced during Mar10 Day 2024.	
The Three-Year Swim Club	TBA	Production paused	
Thunderbolts*	Disney	Pre-production paused ahead of a planned filming start in June 2023; production resumed in February 2024; premiere delayed several times until setting to May 2, 2025	
Transformers One	Paramount	Premiere delayed until September 2024	
Trap	Warner Bros.	Production delayed	
Tron: Ares	Disney	Production postponed; production resumed in January 2024.	
Twisters	Universal	Filming suspended, resumed in November 2023	
Unstoppable	Amazon	Filming cancelled by picketing on May 31, 2023, before being suspended indefinitely	
Untitled Dirty Dancing sequel	Lionsgate	Premiere pushed to summer 2025	
Untitled Josh Safdie film	Netflix	Production postponed; later scrapped	
Untitled Star Wars film	Disney	Premiere delayed indefinitely	
Untitled Transformers film	Paramount	Pre-production suspended	
Wake Up Dead Man	Netflix	Production paused for the duration of the strike	
Welcome to the Fishbowl	TBA	Production on pause; rewrites halted for the duration of the strike	
White Bird	Lionsgate	Premiere delayed until October 2024	

=== Television series ===
The following section lists television series and miniseries that follow a narrative structure. By July 6, 2023, all but four scripted series filming on the East Coast were shut down. (Note: As noted in the table, the four series included Ryan Murphy-produced American Horror Story: Delicate, American Sports Story, and American Horror Stories, and Power Book II: Ghost.)

Series	Network	Notes	Ref.
61st Street (season 2)	The CW	Season premiere delayed	
1923 (season 2)	Paramount+	Filming delayed, resumed in July 2024	
9-1-1 (season 7)	ABC	Season premiere delayed to March 2024; writing room returned on October 2	
9-1-1: Lone Star (season 5)	Fox	Season premiere delayed to September 2024	
The Abandons	Netflix	Production suspended	
Abbott Elementary (season 3)	ABC	Writing room shuttered for duration of the strike; season premiere delayed; writing room returned on the first week of October	
Accused (season 2)	Fox	Season premiere delayed	
Alert: Missing Persons Unit (season 2)	Fox	Season premiere and production delayed; writing room returned on the first week of October	
Alien: Earth	FX on Hulu	Production halted	
All American (season 6)	The CW	Season premiere delayed	
All American: Homecoming (season 3)	The CW	Season premiere delayed	
American Dad! (season 20)	TBS	Writing suspended for the duration of the strike	
American Horror Story (season 12)	FX	Filming commenced prior to the strike; production temporarily suspended due to picketing writers; production later suspended for the duration of the SAG-AFTRA strike	
American Primeval	Netflix	Production halted	
Andor (season 2)	Disney+	Earlier reports erroneously indicated production was unaffected; production has ceased	
Animal Control (season 2)	Fox	Season premiere and production delayed; writing room returned on the first week of October	
Babylon 5	The CW	Development put on hold until the end of the strike	
Before	Apple TV+	Production shut down temporarily before being suspended until the end of the strike	
Bel-Air (season 3)	Peacock	Season premiere delayed to 2024	
Big Mouth (season 8)	Netflix	Writing room shuttered	
Billions (season 7)	Showtime	Production paused multiple times due to picketing	
Blade Runner 2099 (season 1)	Prime Video	Filming delayed until April 2024	
Blue Bloods (season 14)	CBS	Season premiere delayed	
Bob Hearts Abishola (season 5)	CBS	Season premiere delayed	
Bob's Burgers (season 15)	Fox	Production paused; 17 episodes completed; writing room returned on October 2	
The Bold and the Beautiful (season 37)	CBS	Production continuing without union scribes; unionized scribes returned upon the conclusion of the strike	
Boots	Netflix	Production suspended, resumed in March 2024	
The Boys (season 4)	Prime Video	Season premiere delayed	
Bunk'd (season 7)	Disney Channel	Production suspended	
The Chi (season 6)	Showtime	Production paused indefinitely after two consecutive days of shooting were disrupted by the strike	
Chicago Fire (season 12)	NBC	Season premiere and production delayed; writing room returned on the first week of October	
Chicago Med (season 9)	NBC	Season premiere and production delayed; writing room returned on the first week of October	
Chicago P.D. (season 11)	NBC	Season premiere and production delayed; writing room returned on the first week of October	
Chucky (season 3)	Syfy; USA Network	Production paused	
Citadel (season 2)	Prime Video	Season 2 delayed to late 2024/early 2025	
The Cleaning Lady (season 3)	Fox	Season premiere and production delayed; writing room returned on the first week of October	
Cobra Kai (season 6)	Netflix	Production halted	
The Conners (season 6)	ABC	Season premiere pushed to midseason	
Criminal Minds: Evolution (season 2)	Paramount+	Production delayed for the duration of the strike; writing room returned on October 2	
Crystal Lake	Peacock	Production halted, later overhauled with Bryan Fuller being replaced by Brad Kane as showrunner	
CSI: Vegas (season 3)	CBS	Season shortened to 10 episodes, premiere delayed to 2024	
Daredevil: Born Again (season 1)	Disney+	Production shut down repeatedly due to picketing before being suspended for the duration of the strike. Show later overhauled with writers Matt Corman and Chris Ord being replaced by Dario Scardapane, Justin Benson and Aaron Moorhead	
The Dark Tower	TBA	Development and production paused for the duration of the strike	
Days of Our Lives (season 58)	Peacock	Production continuing without head writer Ron Carlivati and other union scribes; unionized scribes returned upon the conclusion of the strike	
Doc (season 1)	Fox	Series premiere delayed	
Dope Thief	Apple TV+	Production temporarily suspended due to picketing writers	
Down Low in the D.R.: Just Another Day in Paradise (season 1)	TBA	Production on hold	
Duster	Max	Production suspended	
Elsbeth (season 1)	CBS	Series premiere and production delayed; writing room returned on October 10	
Emily in Paris (season 4)	Netflix	Filming initially delayed by 2 months; production resumed in January 2024	
The Equalizer (season 4)	CBS	Season premiere delayed	
Eragon (season 1)	Disney+	Development paused for the duration of the strike	
Étoile	Prime Video	Production suspended	
Euphoria (season 3)	HBO	Production delayed due to the strikes; later delayed indefinitely after the deaths of actor Angus Cloud and producer Kevin Turen. Writing resumed in 2024	
Evil (season 4)	Paramount+	Production shuttered for the season	
Extended Family	NBC	Series premiere delayed	
Family Guy (season 22)	Fox	Season 22 completed; creation of additional seasons on pause for the duration of the strike; writing room returned on October 2	
Fargo (season 5)	FX	Season premiere delayed	
FBI (season 6)	CBS	Season premiere delayed and production paused; writing room returned on the first week of October	
FBI: International (season 3)	CBS	Season premiere delayed	
FBI: Most Wanted (season 5)	CBS	Production paused for several hours; season premiere delayed	
Fire Country (season 2)	CBS	Season 2 premiere and production delayed; writing room returned on the first week of October	
FUBAR (season 2)	Netflix	Season 2 production delayed	
General Hospital (season 60)	ABC	Production continued without writer Shannon Peace and other union scribes	
Ghosts (season 3)	CBS	Season premiere and production delayed; writing room returned on the first week of October	
The Good Doctor (season 7)	ABC	Season premiere delayed	
The Good Lawyer	ABC	Series cancelled without filming a single episode	
Good Omens (season 2)	Prime Video	Production completed prior to the strike; subtitles incomplete; season 3 writing on pause	
Good Trouble (season 5)	Freeform	Production paused due to picketing; eventually halted indefinitely	
The Great North (season 4)	Fox	Production paused; season premiere delayed	
Grey's Anatomy (season 20)	ABC	Season premiere delayed; writing room returned on October 2	
Hacks (season 3)	Max	Production suspended for the duration of the strike; season premiere delayed	
The Handmaid's Tale (season 6)	Hulu	Writing suspended	
Hazbin Hotel (season 1)	Prime Video	Series premiere delayed to January 2024	
High Potential (season 1)	ABC	Series premiere pushed to September 2024	
Hysteria!	Peacock	Production halted for the duration of the strike	
Ironheart	Disney+	Post-production work impacted by the WGA and SAG-AFTRA strikes	
It: Welcome to Derry (season 1)	HBO	Delayed to October 2025	
King of the Hill (season 14–15)	Hulu	Writing room shut down; revival premiere delayed to 2025	
A Knight of the Seven Kingdoms (season 1)	HBO	Writing room shut down; series premiere delayed to 2026	
La Brea (season 3)	NBC	Season premiere delayed	
The Last Frontier	Apple TV+	Filming delayed	
The Last of Us (season 2)	HBO	Writing suspended	
Law & Order (season 23)	NBC	Season premiere and production delayed; writing room returned on the first week of October	
Law & Order: Organized Crime (season 4)	NBC	Season premiere delayed	
Law & Order: Special Victims Unit (season 25)	NBC	Season premiere and production delayed; writing room returned on the first week of October	
A League of Their Own (season 1)	Prime Video	Season 2 initially planned for release in 2025; later series was cancelled	
The Librarians: The Next Chapter	The CW	Premiere delayed to 2024	
Little Sky	Netflix	Television pilot; ended production early due to picketing on June 13 and 15, 2023	
Loot (season 2)	Apple TV+	Production shuttered as star and executive producer Maya Rudolph refused to work as writers picketed the production; season premiere delayed to 2024	
Lopez vs Lopez (season 2)	NBC	Premiere delayed	
The Lord of the Rings: The Rings of Power (season 2)	Prime Video	Season 2 production was completed without executive producers J. D. Payne and Patrick McKay	
The Mandalorian (season 4)	Disney+	Production delayed from its original September 2023 filming date; delayed indefinitely after Lucasfilm focusing on The Mandalorian and Grogu	
Matlock (season 1)	CBS	Series premiere delayed to September 2024	
Metropolis	Apple TV+	Series canceled due to the strike and increasing costs	
The Mole Agent (season 1)	Netflix	Production delayed; writing room returned on the first week of October	
Monster (season 2)	Netflix	Production delayed	
Mr. & Mrs. Smith (season 1)	Prime Video	Series premiere delayed	
A Murder at the End of the World	FX on Hulu	Series premiere delayed to November 2023	
NCIS (season 21)	CBS	Production and season premiere delayed; writing room returned on the first week of October; number of episodes reduced.	
NCIS: Hawai'i (season 3)	CBS	Premiere delayed; number of episodes reduced.	
The Neighborhood (season 6)	CBS	Season premiere and production delayed; writing room returned on the first week of October	
The Night Agent (season 2)	Netflix	Production delayed; writing room returned on September 29	
Night Court (season 2)	NBC	Production suspended indefinitely	
Not Dead Yet (season 2)	ABC	Season premiere pushed to midseason	
The Old Man (season 2)	FX	Production suspended for the duration of the strike due to needed rewrites	
On Call	Prime Video	Production delayed due to picketing writers	
One Piece (season 2)	Netflix	Production suspended for the duration of the strike	
Outer Banks (season 4)	Netflix	Production delayed	
Outlander (season 8)	Starz	Writing room shuttered	
Outlander: Blood of My Blood (season 1)	Starz	Production suspended for the duration of the strike	
Peacemaker (season 2)	Max	Season premiere delayed	
The Penguin	HBO	Production shut down repeatedly due to picketing before being suspended for the duration of the strike	
The Perfect Couple	Netflix	Production halted due to pickets	
The Peripheral (season 2)	Prime Video	Production delayed; series eventually cancelled	
Pitch Perfect: Bumper in Berlin (season 2)	Peacock	Series cancelled	
Poker Face (season 2)	Peacock	Season premiere delayed to 2024	
Power Book II: Ghost (season 4)	Starz	Production halted due to picketing writers	
Power Book III: Raising Kanan (season 3)	Starz	Writing room shuttered	
Praise Petey	Freeform	Release date unaffected; series cancelled after the conclusion of its only season	
Pretty Little Liars: Summer School (season 2)	Max	Production suspended due to picketing writers	
P-Valley (season 3)	Starz	Production postponed	
Quantum Leap (season 2)	NBC	Production delayed; writing room returned on October 2	
Rap Sh!t (season 2)	Max	Season premiere delayed	
The Really Loud House (season 2)	Nickelodeon	Production suspended due to picketing writers	
The Recruit (season 2)	Netflix	Production delayed	
Rescue: HI-Surf	Fox	Series premiere and production delayed; writing room returned on the first week of October	
The Residence	Netflix	Production suspended	
Rick and Morty (season 7)	Adult Swim	Writing partially completed prior to the strike	
The Rookie (season 6)	ABC	Season premiere pushed to midseason	
The Sandman (season 2)	Netflix	Production continued without executive producer Neil Gaiman and other writers on set, not allowing rewrites on the script	
School Spirits (season 2)	Paramount+	Production delayed until 2024	
Severance (season 2)	Apple TV+	Production delayed before resuming in Newfoundland on May 13, 2023	
The Sex Lives of College Girls (season 3)	Max	Production delayed; writing room returned on the first week of October	
Shrinking (season 2)	Apple TV+	Production delayed	
Silk: Spider Society (season 1)	Prime Video	Writing paused	
Silo (season 2)	Apple TV+	Production suspended indefinitely	
The Simpsons (season 35)	Fox	Writing paused; writing room returned on October 2	
So Help Me Todd (season 2)	CBS	Season premiere delayed	
Star Trek: Strange New Worlds (season 3)	Paramount+	Production suspended for the duration of the strike	
Station 19 (season 7)	ABC	Season premiere pushed to midseason	
Stranger Things (season 5)	Netflix	Writing paused; writing room returned on September 27; season delayed until 2025	
Superman & Lois (season 4)	The CW	Season premiere delayed	
S.W.A.T. (season 7)	CBS	Season premiere delayed	
Ted Lasso (season 3)	Apple TV+	Release date unaffected; season finale cast panel at Paley Center for Media cancelled	
That '90s Show (season 2)	Netflix	Filming suspended for the duration of the strike	
Tokyo Vice (season 2)	Max	Post-production and premiere delayed for the duration of the strike	
True Detective (season 4)	HBO	Season premiere delayed to January 2024	
Tulsa King (season 2)	Paramount+	Production delayed	
Uncoupled (season 2)	Showtime	Filming paused for the duration of the strike	
Unstable (season 2)	Netflix	Production suspended	
Untitled Ava DuVernay drama	Starz	Production suspended; later cancelled without airing.	
Untitled Real Steel series (season 1)	Disney+	Production paused	
The Upshaws (season 3)	Netflix	Production suspended	
The Venery of Samantha Bird	Starz	Production suspended with two episodes left to film; later cancelled without airing.	
Virgin River (season 5)	Netflix	Season 5 to be released without promotion; development of season 6 to be delayed; writers room returned on October 10	
Walker (season 4)	The CW	Season premiere delayed	
Wednesday (season 2)	Netflix	Season 2 premiere delayed	
When Calls the Heart (season 11)	Hallmark Channel	Production continued without WGA writers on set for the duration of the strike	
While You Were Breeding	Freeform	Post-production shut down	
The White Lotus (season 3)	HBO	Season premiere delayed to February 2025	
Wild Cards (season 1)	TBA	Development paused	
Will Trent (season 2)	ABC	Season premiere delayed to midseason	
Winning Time: The Rise of the Lakers Dynasty (season 3)	HBO	Series cancelled	
Wonder Man	Disney+	Filming paused in late May 2023; production resumed upon the conclusion of the strike	
Wytches	Prime Video	Production delayed; writers room returned on October 23	
XO, Kitty (season 2)	Netflix	Season 2 premiere delayed	
Yellowjackets (season 3)	Showtime	Writing room shuttered; returned on October 4	
Yellowstone (season 5)	Paramount Network	Last episodes delayed to November 2024	
You (season 5)	Netflix	Production delayed	
Young Sheldon (season 7)	CBS	Season premiere and production delayed; writing room returned on the first week of October	
Zero Day	Netflix	Filming postponed indefinitely	

=== Talk shows ===
The following section lists late-night and daytime talk shows.

Show	Network	Notes	Ref.
The Daily Show (season 28–29)	Comedy Central	Production suspended with reruns of old episodes beginning on May 2; following the conclusion of the strike, the series returned on October 16	
The Drew Barrymore Show (season 4)	Syndicated	New season began taping without work by Cristina Kinon and other WGA scribes; eventually shut down for the duration of the strike; season premiere postponed for the duration of the strike; writing team refused to return after the strike, production with new writers continued on October 16	
Hell of a Week with Charlamagne tha God	Comedy Central	Show cancelled	
The Jennifer Hudson Show (season 2)	Syndicated	New season initially planned to start taping without work by WGA scribes; eventually stopped production for the duration of the strike; season premiere delayed for the remainder of the strike; production resumed on October 2	
Jimmy Kimmel Live! (season 20–21)	ABC	Production suspended for the duration of the strike, last episode aired on May 1; production resumed on October 2	
The Kelly Clarkson Show (season 5)	Syndicated	Production suspended for the duration of the strike; production set to continue on October 16	
Last Week Tonight with John Oliver (season 10–11)	HBO	Production suspended for the duration of the strike; production resumed on October 1	
Late Night with Seth Meyers (season 10–11)	NBC	Production suspended for the duration of the strike; production resumed on October 2	
The Late Show with Stephen Colbert (season 8)	CBS	Production suspended for the duration of the strike; production resumed on October 2	
The Problem with Jon Stewart (season 2)	Apple TV+	Production completed prior to the strike, promotional events cancelled	
Real Time with Bill Maher (season 21–22)	HBO	Production initially suspended; eventually planned to restart without WGA scribes; production eventually paused for the duration of the strike; production resumed on September 29	
The Talk (season 13–14)	CBS	Production initially suspended; then planned to resume without WGA scribes; eventually suspended again for the duration of the strike; production set to resume on October 9	
The Tonight Show Starring Jimmy Fallon (season 10–11)	NBC	Production suspended for the duration of the strike; production resumed on October 2	
The View (season 26–27)	ABC	Production continuing without writers; in addition, on June 23, 2023, actor Dermot Mulroney walked off the show in support of the strike	

=== Television programs ===
The following section lists television programs that do not follow a narrative structure.

Project	Network	Notes	Ref.
Big Brother (season 25)	CBS	Unscripted series; premiere of season 25 was delayed from July to August in order to help fill timeslots in the fall lineup.	
Celebrity Jeopardy! (season 2)	ABC	Host Mayim Bialik refused to cross the picket line to tape; Ken Jennings will assume hosting duties. Celebrity Jeopardy! uses WGA writers for its clues.	
Conan O'Brien Must Go (season 1)	Max	Travel show; premiere postponed for the duration of the strike	
Dancing with the Stars (season 32)	ABC	Competition show; fewer celebrities willing to participate due to strike; season premiere set to continue without the WGA scribe; contestant Matt Walsh suspended participation in the show for the duration of the strike; Walsh rejoined the cast upon the conclusion of the strike	
Jeopardy! (seasons 39–40)	Syndicated	Host Mayim Bialik walked off the show during the taping session of season 39 prior to the show's summer break; co-host Ken Jennings assumed hosting duties for the duration of the strike. Production continued with clues that were written prior to the strike through the fall for an extended post-season. Production with WGA scribes resumed on October 4, 2023.	
Jeopardy! Tournament of Champions (season 40)	Syndicated	Numerous champions have refused to participate in show tournaments for the duration of the strike; production was eventually delayed for the duration of the strike	
Password (season 2)	NBC	Unscripted series; filming halted due to host Jimmy Fallon not crossing the picket line	
Saturday Night Live (season 48–49)	NBC	Reruns of old episodes began on May 6; Pete Davidson–Lil Uzi Vert, Kieran Culkin–Labrinth, and Jennifer Coolidge–Foo Fighters episodes canceled; production suspended for the duration of the strike; production returned on October 14	
Tooning Out the News (season 3)	Comedy Central	Live-action/animated news satire; production included members of WGA East and TAG. Production suspended midway its third season, show later cancelled with 2 episodes unproduced.	
You Bet Your Life (season 3)	Syndicated	Production suspended due to host Jay Leno not crossing the picket line	

=== Other ===
The following section lists other media events that do not fall into the categories above.

Project	Network	Notes	Ref.
The Always Sunny Podcast	Megawatt	Production and episode releases on pause for the duration of the strike	
CBS' Fall Schedule Reveal party	CBS	Event postponed	
Hollywood Bowl	—N/a	30th Anniversary "Doggystyle" concert featuring Snoop Dogg and Dr. Dre postponed in solidarity with the striking writers; eventually cancelled	
Netflix's 2023 upfront	—N/a	In-person presentation canceled	

== Productions not affected ==
=== Awards shows ===
Project	Network	Notes	Ref.
58th Academy of Country Music Awards	Prime Video	Script written prior to the strike	

=== Films ===
The following section lists theatrical and direct-to-streaming films.

Film	Distributor	Notes	Ref.
Alien: Romulus	20th Century Studios	Production unaffected and completed prior to the strike	
Aquaman and the Lost Kingdom	Warner Bros.	Production unaffected by strike; premiere unchanged	
The Bearded Girl	TBA	Writers are members of the Writers Guild of Canada	
Beetlejuice Beetlejuice	Warner Bros.	Screenplay completed prior to the strike; production later suspended due to SAG-AFTRA strike	
Deadpool & Wolverine	Disney	Screenplay completed prior to the strike; production later suspended due to SAG-AFTRA strike	
F1	Apple TV+	Screenplay completed prior to the strike; production later suspended due to SAG-AFTRA strike	
Gladiator II	Paramount	Screenplay completed prior to the strike; production later suspended due to SAG-AFTRA strike	
Good Burger 2	Paramount+	Screenplay completed prior to the strike	
The Love Club Moms 1 – Tory's Story	Hallmark	Script written by members of the Writers Guild of Canada	
Mission: Impossible – The Final Reckoning	Paramount	In June 2023 filming pause was attributed to marketing efforts for Part One rather than the strike; production later suspended due to SAG-AFTRA strike	
Mortal Kombat II	Warner Bros.	Screenplay completed prior to the strike; production later suspended due to SAG-AFTRA strike	
Star Trek: Section 31	Paramount+	Script completed prior to the strike	
Untitled fourth Psych film	Peacock	Screenplay completed prior to the strike; film not yet greenlit by Peacock	
Untitled Ocean's Eleven prequel	Warner Bros.	Screenplay completed prior to the strike	
Venom: The Last Dance	Sony	Screenplay completed prior to the strike; production later suspended due to SAG-AFTRA strike	

=== Television series ===
The following section lists television series and miniseries that follow a narrative structure.

Series	Network	Notes	Ref.
Adventure Time: Fionna and Cake (season 1)	Max	Production completed prior to the strike; release unaffected, production covered by The Animation Guild	
Agatha All Along	Disney+	Filming commenced prior to the strike	
American Horror Stories	FX on Hulu	Filming commenced prior to the strike; production later suspended due to SAG-AFTRA strike	
American Sports Story	FX	Filming commenced prior to the strike; production later suspended due to SAG-AFTRA strike	
Among Us	Paramount+	Does not employ WGA writers; production covered by The Animation Guild	
The Blacklist (season 10)	NBC	Filming on final season completed prior to the strike on May 1; series finale aired July 13	
Bluey (season 3)	Disney+	Production completed prior to the strike; Australia-based production, writers are members of the Australian Writers' Guild	
Chief of War	Apple TV+	Filming commenced in New Zealand	
Creature Commandos (season 1)	Max	Does not employ WGA writers	
Doctor Who (season 14)	BBC One	UK-based production, writers are members of the Writers' Guild of Great Britain	
Dune: Prophecy (season 1)	HBO	Hungary-based production	
The Fall of the House of Usher	Netflix	Production and release unaffected	
Fear the Walking Dead (season 8)	AMC	Season premiere unaffected	
Found (season 1)	NBC	Production completed prior to the strike, release unaffected	
Futurama (seasons 8, 9)	Hulu	Production on seasons 8 and 9 completed prior to strike; release unaffected	
The Gilded Age (season 2)	HBO	Production completed prior to the strike	
Heartstopper (season 3)	Netflix	UK-based production, writers part of Writers' Guild of Great Britain	
House of the Dragon (season 2)	HBO	UK-based production; scripts completed prior to the strike	
The Idol	HBO	Production completed prior to the strike, series later cancelled	
Interview with the Vampire (season 2)	AMC	Filming commenced prior to the strike; production later suspended due to SAG-AFTRA strike	
The Irrational (season 1)	NBC	Production completed prior to strike; release unaffected	
Nancy Drew (season 4)	The CW	Production on final season completed prior to the strike; premiere unaffected	
Phineas and Ferb (season 5)	Disney Channel	Does not employ WGA writers; production covered by The Animation Guild	
Riverdale (season 7)	The CW	Scripts written and production on final season completed prior to strike; series finale aired August 23	
South Park (season 27)	Comedy Central	Does not employ WGA writers; co-creators Trey Parker and Matt Stone are both not members of the WGA	
Star Trek: Lower Decks (season 5)	Paramount+	Does not employ WGA writers; production covered by The Animation Guild	
The Walking Dead: Dead City (season 1)	AMC	Series premiere unaffected; filming commenced in France	

=== Talk shows ===
The following section lists late-night and daytime talk shows.

Show	Network	Notes	Ref.
Gutfeld! (season 3)	Fox News	Does not employ WGA writers	
Karamo (season 2)	Syndicated	Does not employ WGA writers	
Live with Kelly and Mark (season 29)	Syndicated	Does not employ WGA writers	
Sherri (season 2)	Syndicated	Does not employ WGA writers	
Tamron Hall (season 4)	Syndicated	Does not employ WGA writers	
Watch What Happens Live with Andy Cohen (season 19)	Bravo	Does not employ WGA writers	

=== Television programs ===
The following section lists television programs that do not follow a narrative structure.

Project	Network	Notes	Ref.
$100,000 Pyramid	ABC	Production was completed prior to the strike.	
AEW	TNT, TBS, YouTube, and Bleacher Report	Does not have a writing team; creative production handled by Tony Khan and talent themselves	
The Amazing Race (seasons 35, 37)	CBS	Unscripted series. The thirty-sixth season was filmed in 2022 during COVID-19 protocols and premiere delayed to March 2024, allowed the preceding thirty-fifth season was filmed for the duration of the strike.	
America's Got Talent (season 18)	NBC	Unscripted series	
American Idol (season 22)	ABC	Unscripted series, release unaffected	
The Bachelor (season 28)	ABC	Unscripted series; filming began shortly before the conclusion of the strike	
The Bachelorette (season 20)	ABC	Production completed prior to the strike	
Celebrity Family Feud	ABC	Production completed prior to the strike	
The Masked Singer (season 9)	Fox	Unscripted series	
Press Your Luck	ABC	Production completed prior to the strike	
Survivor (seasons 45–46)	CBS	Unscripted series; the forty-sixth season was filmed for the duration of the strike	
The Voice (season 24)	NBC	Unscripted series	
Wheel of Fortune (season 40)	Syndicated	Does not employ WGA writers	
WWE	Fox, Peacock, and USA	Does not employ WGA writers	

== See also ==
- List of productions impacted by the 2023 SAG-AFTRA strike
- Effect of the 2007–08 Writers Guild of America strike on television
- List of entertainment affected by the September 11 attacks
- Impact of the COVID-19 pandemic on cinema
  - List of films impacted by the COVID-19 pandemic
- Impact of the COVID-19 pandemic on television in the United States
  - List of American television series impacted by the COVID-19 pandemic
