= List of productions impacted by the 2023 SAG-AFTRA strike =

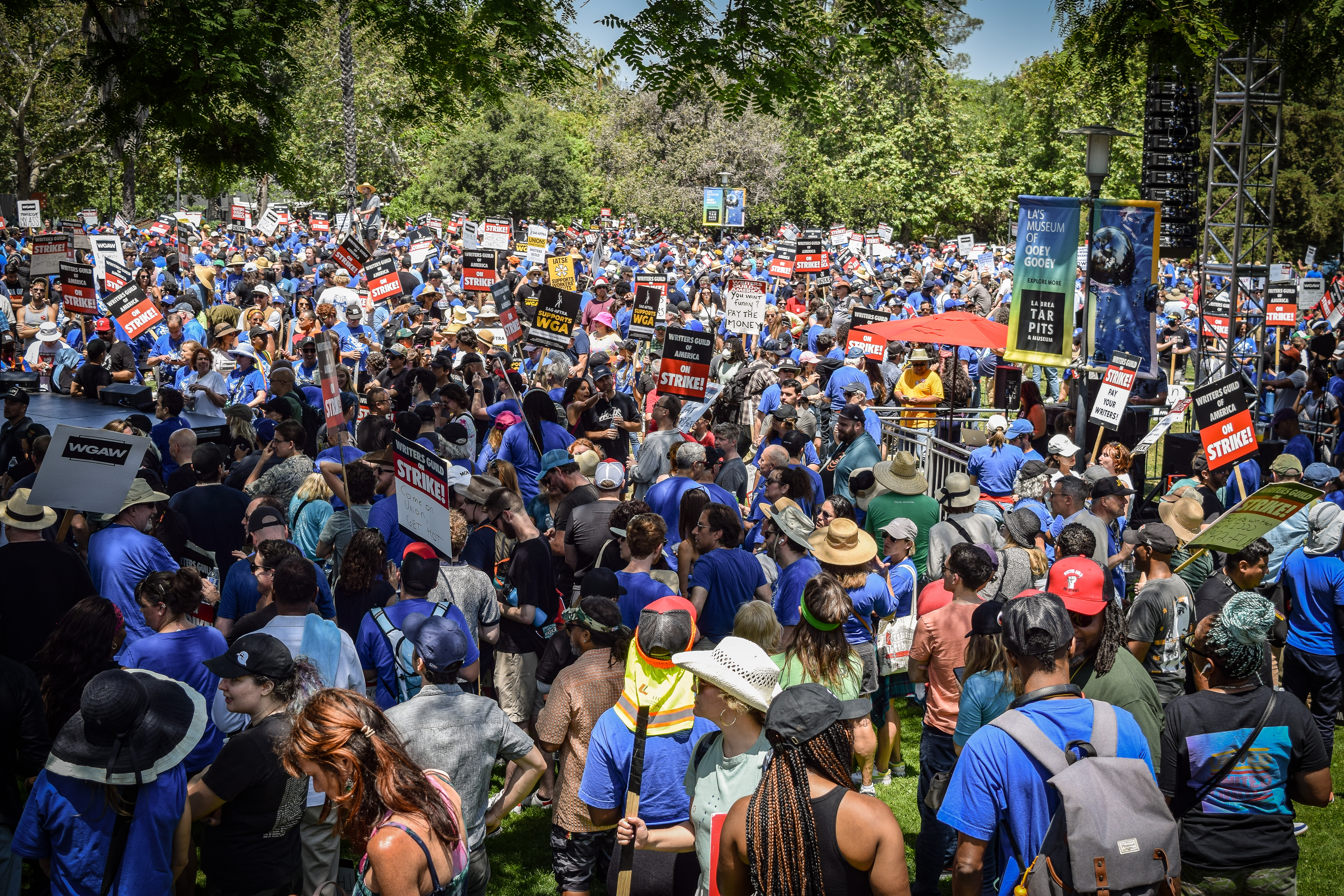
A crowd of SAG-AFTRA and WGA members striking in Los Angeles on June 21, 2023.

The 2023 SAG-AFTRA strike had a significant impact on the film and television industries of the United States, causing many film and television projects to shut down or postpone production. Many productions had already been affected by the concurrent Writers Guild of America strike which began in May 2023 and concluded in late September 2023. The strike ended on November 9, 2023, at 12:01 a.m. PDT.

== Productions affected ==
=== Film ===
Title	Distributor	Status	Notes	Ref.
Abigail	Universal	Both resumed in December 2023	Production suspended	
The Amateur	20th Century Studios	Both resumed in December 2023	Production suspended and release date delayed after the strike	
Anniversary	Lionsgate	Granted a waiver to resume production	Production suspended	
Avatar: Fire and Ash	20th Century Studios	Resumed after the strike ended	Post-production suspended	
Avatar 4	20th Century Studios	Resumed after the strike ended	Production suspended	
Bad Boys: Ride or Die	Sony	Resumed after the strike ended	Production suspended and release date delayed	
Beetlejuice Beetlejuice	Warner Bros.	Resumed on November 16, 2023	Production suspended	
A Complete Unknown	Searchlight Pictures	Resumed after the strike ended	Production start delayed	
The Conjuring: Last Rites	Warner Bros.	Resumed after the strike ended	Pre-production suspended	
Deadpool & Wolverine	Marvel Studios	Resumed on November 23	Production suspended and release date delayed	
DreamQuil	Republic Pictures	All resumed after the strike ended	Production suspended	
F1	Warner Bros. Apple TV+	All resumed after the strike ended	Production suspended	
The Fantastic Four: First Steps	Marvel Studios	All resumed after the strike ended	Casting process paused and release date delayed	
Fast Forever	Universal	All resumed after the strike ended	Pre-production suspended and release date delayed to March 17, 2028	
Final Destination Bloodlines	Warner Bros.	Resumed when the strike ended	Production start delayed	
Gladiator II	Paramount	Resumed on December 4	Production suspended	
Hedda	Amazon MGM Studios	Resumed after the strike ended	Production start delayed	
How to Train Your Dragon	Universal	Screen tests were held in December 2023 after the strike ended	Production start delayed and release date delayed	
Iron Lung	Markiplier Studios	Resumed after the strike ended	Received a SAG-AFTRA "interim agreement". However, film's promotion paused due to the director and producer, Mark Fischbach, being a member of SAG-AFTRA	
The Island	TBA	Resumed after the strike ended	Production suspended after bond companies refused to insure the movie anticipating the strike	
It Ends with Us	Sony	Resumed on January 5, 2024	Production suspended and release date delayed	
Juror No. 2	Warner Bros.	All resumed after the strike ended	Production suspended	
Karate Kid: Legends	Sony	All resumed after the strike ended	Pre-production suspended and release date delayed	
Lilo & Stitch	Disney	All resumed after the strike ended	Production suspended	
Merrily We Roll Along	TBA	All resumed after the strike ended	Production suspended	
Michael	Lionsgate	Resumed on January 22, 2024	Pre-production suspended and release date delayed	
A Minecraft Movie	Warner Bros.	Resumed mid-January 2024	Production start delayed	
Mission: Impossible – The Final Reckoning	Paramount	Resumed in March 2024	Production suspended and release date delayed; resumed in March 2024	
Moana	Disney	Resumed on November 8	Casting process paused and release date delayed	
Mortal Kombat II	Warner Bros.	Resumed in mid-November	Production suspended	
The Movie Critic	Sony	Resumed after the strike ended; later cancelled	Production start delayed	
Mufasa: The Lion King	Disney	Resumed after the strike ended	Production suspended and release date delayed	
Paddington in Peru	StudioCanal	Wrapped before the strike ended	Rachel Zegler, being a member of SAG-AFTRA, was replaced by Carla Tous	
Scream 7	Paramount	Resumed after the strike ended	Pre-production suspended	
Shelby Oaks	Neon	Resumed after the strike ended	Post-production suspended	
Sonic the Hedgehog 3	Paramount	Filming with physical actors started on November 29, 2023	Filming started in September without actors	
Speak No Evil	Universal	Resumed mid-November 2023	Production suspended and release date delayed	
Spider-Man: Beyond the Spider-Verse	Sony	Resumed after the strike ended	Voice recording suspended and release date delayed indefinitely	
Star Trek: Section 31	Paramount+	Resumed after the strike ended	Production initially slated to begin in October 2023 delayed	
Superman	Warner Bros.	Resumed in February 2024	Pre-production suspended	
The Super Mario Galaxy Movie	Universal	Resumed after the strike ended	Production suspended	
Tron: Ares	Disney	Resumed in early 2024	Production start delayed	
Twisters	Universal	Resumed after the strike ended	Production suspended	
Untitled Dirty Dancing sequel	Lionsgate	Resumed after the strike ended	Pre-production suspended and release date delayed	
Untitled Ocean's Eleven prequel	Warner Bros.	Resumed after the strike ended	Production start delayed	
Untitled Transformers film	Paramount	Resumed after the strike ended	Pre-production suspended	
Venom: The Last Dance	Sony	Resumed after the strike ended	Production suspended and release date delayed	
Welcome to the Fishbowl	TBA	Resumed after the strike ended	Production suspended	
Wicked and Wicked: For Good	Universal	Resumed after the strike ended	Production suspended	
Wolfs	Apple TV+	Resumed after the strike ended	Production suspended	

=== Television ===
Title	Network	Status	Notes	Ref.
1923 (season 2)	Paramount+	All resumed after the strike ended	Production suspended	
Alien: Earth (season 1)	FX on Hulu	All resumed after the strike ended	Production suspended	
American Horror Stories (season 3)	FX on Hulu	All resumed after the strike ended	Production suspended	
American Horror Story (season 12)	FX	All resumed after the strike ended	Production suspended	
American Primeval	Netflix	All resumed after the strike ended	Production suspended	
American Sports Story	FX	All resumed after the strike ended	Production suspended	
Andor (season 2)	Disney+	All resumed after the strike ended	Production suspended	
Apples Never Fall	Peacock	All resumed after the strike ended	Production suspended	
Blue Bloods (season 14)	CBS	All resumed after the strike ended	Production suspended	
Chucky (season 3)	Syfy and USA Network	All resumed after the strike ended	Production suspended	
Coast to Coast with Vincent Fiore	Amazon	All resumed after the strike ended	Production suspended	
Daredevil: Born Again (season 1)	Disney+	All resumed after the strike ended	Production suspended with less than a half of the season shot. During the strike, writers and directors were let go as the show will be overhauled	
The Day of the Jackal	Peacock	All resumed after the strike ended	Pre-production suspended	
Emily in Paris (season 4)	Netflix	All resumed after the strike ended	Production start delayed	
Entertainment Tonight Canada (season 19)	Global	Series cancelled		
Euphoria (season 3)	HBO	Production start delayed and release date delayed indefinitely		
The Franchise	HBO	Resumed after the strike ended	Production suspended	
A Gentleman in Moscow	Showtime and Paramount+	Resumed after the strike ended	Production suspended	
Interview with the Vampire (season 2)	AMC	Granted a waiver to resume production	Production suspended	
Ironheart	Disney+	Resumed after the strike ended	Post-production work impacted by the SAG-AFTRA strike	
It: Welcome to Derry (season 1)	HBO	Resumed after the strike ended	Production suspended and release date delayed	
The Last Frontier	Apple TV+	Resumed after the strike ended	Production suspended; resumed after the strike ended	
The Last of Us (season 2)	HBO	Resumed after the strike ended	Production start delayed	
Law & Order (season 23)	NBC	Resumed after the strike ended	Production suspended	
A League of Their Own (season 2)	Prime Video	Series canceled	Season 2 initially planned for release in 2025	
The New Look (season 2)	Apple TV+	Resumed after the strike ended	Production suspended	
One Piece (season 2)	Netflix	Resumed after the strike ended	Production on hold for the duration of the strike	
Outer Banks (season 4)	Netflix	Resumed after the strike ended	Production suspended	
The Peripheral (season 2)	Prime Video	Series cancelled		
Pitch Perfect: Bumper in Berlin (season 2)	Peacock	Series cancelled		
The Residence	Netflix	All resumed after the strike ended	Production suspended; all resumed after the strike ended	
Quantum Leap (season 2)	NBC	All resumed after the strike ended	Production suspended; all resumed after the strike ended	
The Sandman (season 2)	Netflix	All resumed after the strike ended	Production suspended; all resumed after the strike ended	
Silo (season 2)	Apple TV+	All resumed after the strike ended	Production suspended; all resumed after the strike ended	
Star Trek: Strange New Worlds (season 3)	Paramount+	All resumed after the strike ended	Production suspended; all resumed after the strike ended	
Stranger Things (season 5)	Netflix	Both resumed after the strike ended	Production start delayed; both resumed after the strike ended	
The Summer I Turned Pretty (season 3)	Prime Video	Both resumed after the strike ended	Production start delayed; both resumed after the strike ended	
Untitled Ava DuVernay drama	Starz	Series canceled without airing	Production suspended	
The Venery of Samantha Bird	Starz	Series canceled without airing	Production suspended with two episodes left to film	
The Walking Dead: The Ones Who Live	AMC	Resumed after receiving "interim agreement"	Production suspended	
When Calls the Heart (season 11)	Hallmark Channel	Received a SAG-AFTRA "interim agreement" allowing production to continue as scheduled	Production continued without members of SAG-AFTRA	
The White Lotus (season 3)	HBO	Resumed after the strike ended	Production start delayed and release date delayed	
Winning Time: The Rise of the Lakers Dynasty (season 3)	HBO	Series cancelled		
The Wiseguy Kitchen	Amazon	Resumed after the strike ended	Production suspended	
Yellowjackets (season 3)	Showtime	Resumed after the strike ended	Writer's room meetings suspended	
Yellowstone (season 5, part 2)	Paramount Network	Resumed after the strike ended	Production suspended and release date delayed	

=== Other media ===
Title	Network	Status	Notes	Ref.
The Always Sunny Podcast	Megawatt	Resumed after the strike ended	Production paused; live shows in New York and Philadelphia unaffected	
Boneheads	Wishbone Production	Resumed after the strike ended	Premiere paused	
Dimension 20	Dropout	Production resumed in August after being determined a non-struck production	Production initially suspended	
Drama Queens	iHeartPodcasts	Discussion of the show resumed after the strike ended	Production to continue without discussion of the show	
Fake Doctors, Real Friends with Zach and Donald	iHeartPodcasts	Discussion of the show resumed after the strike ended	Production to continue without discussion of the show	
Fly on the Wall	Cadence13	Continued after the strike ended	Production continuing without discussion of struck material until the end of the strike	
Full House Rewind	PodCo	Resumed after the strike ended	Paused for the duration of the strike	
Game Changer	Dropout	Production resumed in August after being determined a non-struck production	Production initially suspended	
Let the Mystery Be	Headgum	Resumed after the strike ended	Production paused	
Um, Actually	Dropout	Production resumed in August after being determined a non-struck production	Production initially suspended	
Wizards of Waverly Pod	PodCo	Resumed after the strike ended	Production paused	

== Affected releases ==
=== Film ===
This section contains films that completed filming prior to the SAG-AFTRA strike, but had their release dates affected due to the strike.

Title	Distributor	Original release date	New release date
Afraid	Sony	August 25, 2023	August 30, 2024
The Alto Knights	Warner Bros.	February 2, 2024	March 21, 2025
The Amateur	20th Century Studios	November 8, 2024	April 11, 2025
The Bikeriders	20th Century Studios (Note: Distribution rights have since gone to Focus Features.)	December 1, 2023	June 21, 2024
Bob Marley: One Love	Paramount	January 12, 2024	February 14, 2024
Captain America: Brave New World	Marvel Studios	July 26, 2024	February 14, 2025
Challengers	Amazon MGM Studios	September 15, 2023	April 26, 2024
Damsel	Netflix	October 13, 2023	March 8, 2024
Deadpool & Wolverine	Marvel Studios	May 3, 2024	July 26, 2024
Drive-Away Dolls	Focus Features	September 22, 2023	February 23, 2024
Dune: Part Two	Warner Bros.	November 3, 2023	March 1, 2024
Elio	Disney	March 1, 2024	June 20, 2025
The Fall Guy	Universal	March 1, 2024	May 3, 2024
A Family Affair	Netflix	November 17, 2023	June 28, 2024
Force of Nature: The Dry 2	Roadshow Films	August 24, 2023	February 8, 2024
Ghostbusters: Frozen Empire	Sony	December 20, 2023	March 22, 2024
Godzilla x Kong: The New Empire	Warner Bros.	March 15, 2024	March 29, 2024
Gran Turismo	Sony	August 11, 2023	August 25, 2023
How to Train Your Dragon	Universal	March 14, 2025	June 13, 2025
It Ends with Us	Sony	February 9, 2024	August 9, 2024
Kraven the Hunter	Sony	October 6, 2023	December 13, 2024
Lift	Netflix	August 25, 2023	January 12, 2024
The Lord of the Rings: The War of the Rohirrim	Warner Bros.	April 12, 2024	December 13, 2024
Magazine Dreams	Searchlight Pictures (Note: Distribution rights have since gone to Briarcliff Entertainment.)	December 8, 2023	March 21, 2025
Mickey 17	Warner Bros.	March 29, 2024	March 7, 2025
Mission: Impossible – The Final Reckoning	Paramount	June 28, 2024	May 23, 2025
Mufasa: The Lion King	Disney	July 5, 2024	December 20, 2024
Players	Netflix	Q4 2023	February 14, 2024
Poor Things	Searchlight Pictures	September 8, 2023	December 8, 2023
Problemista	A24	August 4, 2023	March 1, 2024
A Quiet Place: Day One	Paramount	March 8, 2024	June 28, 2024
Red One	Amazon MGM Studios	December 2023	November 15, 2024
Shirley	Netflix	2023	March 22, 2024
Snow White	Disney	March 22, 2024	March 21, 2025
Spaceman	Netflix	2023	March 1, 2024
Speak No Evil	Universal	August 9, 2024	September 13, 2024
The SpongeBob Movie: Search for SquarePants	Paramount	May 23, 2025	December 19, 2025
Thunderbolts*	Marvel Studios	December 20, 2024	May 2, 2025
The Underdoggs	Amazon MGM Studios	October 20, 2023	January 26, 2024
Venom: The Last Dance	Sony	July 12, 2024	October 25, 2024
White Bird	Lionsgate	August 18, 2023	October 4, 2024

=== Television ===
This section contains television shows that completed filming prior to the SAG-AFTRA strike, but had their release dates affected due to the strike.

Title	Network	Original release date	New release date
9-1-1: Lone Star (season 5)	Fox	September 19, 2023	September 23, 2024
Euphoria (season 3)	HBO	2024	April 12, 2026
Fargo (season 5)	FX	September 2023	November 21, 2023
High Potential (season 1)	ABC	2023–24 season	September 17, 2024
It: Welcome to Derry (season 1)	HBO	Halloween 2024	October 26, 2025
Matlock (season 1)	CBS	2023–24 season	October 17, 2024
Mr. & Mrs. Smith	Prime Video	November 2023	February 2, 2024
A Murder at the End of the World	FX on Hulu	August 29, 2023	November 14, 2023
Poppa's House	CBS	2023–24 season	October 21, 2024
Rap Sh!t (season 2)	Max	August 10, 2023	November 9, 2023
True Detective (season 4)	HBO	2023	January 14, 2024
The White Lotus (season 3)	HBO	2024	February 16, 2025
Yellowstone (season 5, part 2)	Paramount Network	2023	November 10, 2024

== See also ==
- List of productions impacted by the 2023 Writers Guild of America strike
- Impact of the COVID-19 pandemic on cinema
  - List of films impacted by the COVID-19 pandemic
  - Impact of the COVID-19 pandemic on television in the United States
    - List of American television series impacted by the COVID-19 pandemic
