= Bridge of Lies (game show) =

British quiz show (2022–present)

- Genre: Quiz show
- Developed by: Josephine Brassey; Ben Justice; Dorsa Nam
- Directed by: John Smith; Janine O'Connor
- Presented by: Ross Kemp
- Theme music composer: Lawrence Oakley
- Country of origin: United Kingdom
- Original language: English
- No. of series: 5 (Regular); 4 (Celebrity)
- No. of episodes: 124 (Regular); 36 (Celebrity)

Production
- Executive producer: Gary Chippington
- Producer: Nick Gunaydin
- Production locations: BBC Pacific Quay (2022, 2024–); Kelvin Hall (2023)
- Camera setup: Multi-camera
- Running time: 45 minutes
- Production company: STV Studios

Original release
- Network: BBC One
- Release: 14 March 2022 – present

Bridge of Lies is a British quiz show presented by Ross Kemp that has aired on BBC One since 14 March 2022. In each episode, a team of four attempts to cross the titular bridge by identifying correct answers to a given category of knowledge or general knowledge through two rounds in order to win a cash prize.

== Development and production ==
Alongside The Tournament, Bridge of Lies was commissioned in 2021 following a seven month tender process overseen by the BBC to find new game show formats made in Scotland. These two shows were described by the BBC as "stand out formats in a competitive field". In 2022, a celebrity edition of the show was commissioned off the success of the first regular series aired that year. The show is reportedly inspired by shows such as Divided, The Chase, The Cube and Tenable.

The show has been filmed at the BBC's Pacific Quay studios in Glasgow since the first series; except for the second series, which was filmed at the Kelvin Hall studios operated by BBC Studioworks, a commercial arm of the BBC. Three episodes of the show were filmed every day during production as of 2025. As of October 2026, 5 regular series and 4 celebrity series have been aired; the sixth regular series and fifth celebrity series had been commissioned and is due to film in November 2026.

== Format ==
Each episode features a team of four contestants. The game has two rounds, the Individual Crossings and the Final Crossing. Each contestant undertakes their own individual crossing to earn money for their team, and the final crossing is to determine whether they go home with the money they've banked.

=== Individual Crossings ===
Before each individual crossing, the team is told the category. They must then choose who, of the people that haven't already played, will play with that category.

The contestant selected to cross the bridge is presented with a variety of true or false options/statements (truths or lies) as circular steps gradually revealed as they progresses, and has 5 minutes to complete a crossing. There are 32 steps on the bridge, consisting of 22 truths and 10 lies. They cannot confer with other players and must step on the truths to progress across the bridge. Stepping on a truth is worth £100 (£200 for the final contestant to play the Individual Crossing since Series 2) and reveals more statements, but stepping on a lie halves the accumulated total for the crossing. Stepping on 3 lies during one crossing or running out of time ends the crossing immediately, and eliminates the contestant from the show. Should a contestant successfully make it from one end to the bridge to the other one, they bank the money accumulated from their crossing to the team's prize fund and are through to play in the Final Crossing. The maximum total each player can bank at this stage is £2,200. Since Series 2, the fourth member of the team to undertake the Individual Crossing is given double money for each truth they step on, meaning the maximum total they can bank is £4,400.

In the Celebrity series, each truth for the first 3 players in a team is worth £200, with the fourth player earning £400 per truth (and a maximum of £8,800).

==== Panic Button ====
The team also has a panic button they can press once per show. The button is available from the team's Waiting Room; only the contestants who are present there (thus yet to attempt a crossing) may press the button. The button automatically guarantees the contestant in play a place in the final and banks their accumulated money at the moment of pressing the button, but renders any actions taken after that null and void.

=== Final Crossing ===
Any team member that completes their Individual Crossing or is saved by their team's panic button will join forces to play the Final Crossing for the team's prize fund. Before the round begins, the team can buy back one eliminated contestant for half of their prize fund, or sell a contestant, thus eliminating them, to double the prize fund, for a jackpot of £22,000. Eliminated contestants may not be involved in any gameplay in the final. The team then decides the order of play of each team member for the round.

Similar to the Individual Crossing, only one contestant is on the bridge at all times; however, they are allowed to confer with their teammates standing in the wings. The bridge presents six sets of statements (seven for Series 1–2) across a row on the floor, which are general knowledge rather than corresponding to a specific category. Only one of the statements in each set is true. Picking a true statement progresses the game, while picking a lie results in a contestant's elimination. If a contestant is eliminated, the next player continues at the same point as the eliminated contestant. Play continues until either one contestant manages to reach the other end of the bridge, thus winning the prize, or the entire team is eliminated, leaving with nothing.

== Transmissions ==
=== Regular ===
Series	Start date	End date	Episodes
1	14 March 2022	15 April 2022	25
2	23 January 2023	24 February 2023	25
3	11 March 2024	12 April 2024	25
4	2 June 2025	17 July 2025	24 (Note: Commissioned for 25 episodes, 1 episode is unaired.)
5	27 April 2026	22 October 2026	25

=== Celebrity ===
Series	Start date	End date	Episodes
1	14 January 2023	1 April 2023	8
2	6 April 2024	22 June 2024	8
3	15 February 2025	12 July 2025	10
4	11 April 2026	27 June 2026	10

== International broadcasts ==
Bridge of Lies is available on BBC Nordic and BBC Africa, two channels owned by BBC Studios, the BBC's commercial arm. It is also acquired by RTÉ in Ireland. Since 2025, both the regular and celebrity versions of the programme have been shown on the Seven Network in Australia.

== Reception ==
Bridge of Lies has received generally favourable reviews from critics. Writing for The Guardian, Stuart Heritage called Bridge of Lies "sleek and gleaming and finely engineered programme-making" and praised Kemp's presenting style. The Halifax Courier wrote that the show had proved that there were "plenty of life in the old dog of the quiz show format". In a mixed review, The Telegraph's Anita Singh praised the accessibility of the format and the adequate question difficulty; however, she was critical of Kemp's overfocus on chatting to the contestants instead of the gameplay.

== International versions ==
International format rights are held globally by BBC Studios Distribution except for the United States and Australia, which were retained by format owners STV Studios.

Country	Name	Host(s)	Network	Premiere	Finale	Ref(s)
Spain	El puente de las mentiras	Paula Vázquez	La 1	26 July 2023	30 August 2023	
United States	Beat the Bridge	Cameron Mathison	Game Show Network	10 June 2024	1 July 2025	
