= Jessica Rhoades =

American television producer

Jessica Rhoades is an American television producer. She is an executive producer on the sci-fi drama anthology series Black Mirror and has produced for limited series such as Sharp Objects and Station Eleven. In 2018, she launched her production company, Pacesetter Productions, to focus on bringing the projects of new and established writers to life.

== Early and personal life ==
Rhoades has a Masters of Fine Arts from the Producer’s Program in the School of Theatre, Film, and Television at UCLA. After graduating, Rhoades spent 15 years working for Bravo, E!, Nickelodeon and TLC, partnering with Ashley Tisdale at Blondie Girl Productions. In 2018, she left Blumhouse Television to form her production company, Pacesetter Productions.

== Career ==
Rhoades was an executive producer on Gillian Flynn's Amazon Studios series Utopia in 2020, on season two of Dirty John, and in 2018 on Sharp Objects, based on the novel by Flynn and adapted by Marti Noxon, starring Amy Adams and directed by Jean-Marc Vallée.

She served as an executive producer on the HBO Max limited series Station Eleven from creator Patrick Somerville and director Hiro Murai.

Rhoades is an executive producer of the Netflix series Black Mirror.

Rhoades' additional credits include Showtime's The Affair and NBC's The Village.

== Recognition ==
In 2019, Sharp Objects was nominated for three Golden Globe Awards and eight Primetime Emmy Awards, including nominations for Best Limited Series for both. Other award nominations for Sharp Objects include Breakthrough Series – Long Form at the Gotham Awards and a nomination at the Producers Guild of America Awards.

In 2022, Station Eleven was nominated for seven Emmys, three Film Independent Spirit Awards, including Best New Scripted Series, and a Critics' Choice Award for Best Limited Series. Other award nominations for Station Eleven include Breakthrough Series – Long Form at the Gotham Awards, as well as a Peabody Award, a Television Critics Association Award and a GLAAD Media Award.

In 2024, for her work on Black Mirror season six, Rhoades won a Producers Guild of America Award alongside creator Charlie Brooker in the category of Outstanding Producer of Televised or Streamed Motion Pictures. The series also was nominated at the 2024 BAFTA TV Awards for Best Limited Drama.

In 2025, the seventh season of Black Mirror, received nine Primetime Emmy Award nominations, making it the most nominated season of the series to date.

== Filmography ==
Year	Title	Credited As	Notes
2001	Doppelganger	Producer (as 'Jessica Horowitz')	Short film
2001	Offside	Associate Producer (as 'Jessica Horowitz')	Short film
2003	Party Foul	Producer (as 'Jessica Horowitz')	Short film
2003	Our Very First Sex Tape	Producer (as 'Jessica Horowitz')	Short film
2005	The Road to Stardom with Missy Elliott	Producer (as 'Jessica Horowitz')	TV Series
2008	Your Place or Mine?	Executive Producer (as 'Jessica Horowitz')	TV Series, 5 episodes
2008	Autopsy	Producer (as 'Jessica Horowitz')	
2009	Spectacular!	Executive Producer, Producer (as 'Jessica Horowitz')	
2010	Beauty & the Briefcase	Executive Producer (as 'Jessica Horowitz')	
2010	Den Brother	Executive Producer (as 'Jessica Horowitz')	
2011	Best Player	Executive Producer (as 'Jessica Horowitz')	
2011	The Suite Life Movie	Producer	
2012	Rags	Executive producer	
2012	Miss Advised	Executive producer	TV series
2013	Vanessa & Ashley: Inner Circle	Executive producer	TV series
2014	Cloud 9	Executive producer	
2014	Ascension	Co-executive producer	TV Mini Series, 2 episodes
2016	Judgement Day: Prison or Parole?	Executive producer, associate producer	TV Series, 3 episodes
2016	Legends of the Hidden Temple	Executive producer	
2017	Election Day: Lens Across America	Executive producer	
2017	Cold Case Files (1999-)	Executive producer	TV Series, 1 episode
2017	Cold Case Files (2017-)	Executive producer	TV Series, 9 episodes
2014-2018	Young & Hungry	Executive producer	TV Series, 30 episodes
2018	Run for Your Life	Executive producer	
2018	Sharp Objects	Executive producer	TV Series, 8 episodes
2018	Tremors	Executive producer	
2018-2019	The Affair	Executive producer	TV Series, 18 episodes
2019	The Village	Executive producer	TV Series, 10 episodes
2020	Dirty John	Executive producer	TV Series, 8 episodes
2020	Utopia	Executive producer	TV Series, 8 episodes
2021-2022	Station Eleven	Executive producer	TV Series, 10 episodes
2022	The Aviary	Producer	
2023-2025	Black Mirror	Executive producer	TV Series, season 6, 7
(Upcoming)	Ponies	Executive producer	TV Series
(Upcoming)	Girl Abroad	Producer	TV Series
(Upcoming)	The Vapors	Executive producer	TV Series
(Upcoming)	The Venery of Samantha Bird	Executive producer	TV Series
