= Your Place or Mine =

Your Place or Mine may refer to:

- Your Place or Mine? (game show), an American television game show
- Your Place or Mine!, 1998 Hong Kong film
- Your Place or Mine? (film), 2015 Filipino romantic film
- Your Place or Mine (film), 2023 American romantic comedy film
- "Your Place or Mine?" (Everybody Loves Raymond), a 1996 television episode
- "Your Place or Mine?" (Three Up, Two Down), a 1985 television episode

== See also ==
- Your Place or Mine Recording, home studio owned by Mark Linett
- Your Face or Mine?
