= Beat the Bridge =

- Genre: Quiz show
- Presented by: Cameron Mathison
- Country of origin: United States
- Original language: English

Production
- Camera setup: Multi-camera
- Running time: 45 minutes
- Production company: STV Studios

Original release
- Network: Game Show Network
- Release: June 10, 2024 – July 1, 2025

Beat the Bridge is an American adaptation of the British game show Bridge of Lies featuring an enormous interactive bridge that dares three players to cross it just by easily stepping on the right answers to challenging trivia questions.

In this game, each step forward puts money in the team's bank, with bonus money for each successful crossing. However, the team gets to keep the money only if it can "beat the bridge" just by returning one of its players back across before time expires.

== Gameplay ==
=== Main Game ===
In this game show, a team of three contestants attempt to cross a bridge by stepping on correct answers to categories. Each correct answer is worth money and allows a contestant to move forward, while each incorrect answer forces that contestant to move back and gives them another set of answers to work with. If a contestant crosses the bridge by stepping on seven correct answers (one correct answer on each row), it’s worth bonus money. But if a contestant steps on three incorrect answers, the money accumulated is cut in half, unless their teammates have pressed a button called the "Bank-It Button," at which point the team banks all the money in the total of that round at the time that button is pressed.

=== Round One ===
In this round, are played two categories and the team chooses which contestant to play the first category, and they choose which one of the remaining two contestants to play the second category after the first one is played. Each row has two answers to choose from. Each correct answer is worth $200, and getting across the bridge is worth a bonus of $300, for a possible $1,700 per category ($3,400 altogether).

=== Round Two ===
In this phase, one category is played, and the contestant who didn’t play either category in the previous round plays the category in this round. The first, third, fifth, and seventh rows each have two answers to choose from, while the second, fourth, and sixth rows each have three answers to choose from. Each correct answer is worth $300, and getting across the bridge is worth a bonus of $400, for a possible $2,500.

=== Round Three ===
In this round, one category is played, and the team chooses which contestant to play it. Each row has three answers to choose from. Each correct answer is worth $500, and getting across the bridge is worth a bonus of $600, for a possible $4,100, which makes for a total of $10,000. In the pilot (which was the 43rd episode to be broadcast), there were ten rows instead of seven; correct answers here were worth $400 and getting across earned a bonus of $500, for a possible $4,500, which made for a total of $10,400.

=== Final Round ===
After three rounds, the team attempts to cross the bridge back to the starting point, one contestant at a time. There are ten rows of three answers on the bridge in this round, and the contestants must step on correct answers to clues in order to move forward. If a contestant steps on an incorrect answer, the clock stops, they are eliminated from further play in this round, and one of the remaining contestants takes their place on the bridge. If the team gets one contestant across the bridge within 90 seconds, they win all the money banked plus a $5,000 bonus, for a possible $15,000. In the pilot, after the team won $10,400 and managed to get across, they won all the money for a grand total of $15,400. If the team runs out of time or steps on three incorrect answers, they lose all the money in the bank, and the game is over, and they leave with a consolation prize of $1,000.
