= The Christmas Ornament =

2013 film directed by Mark Jean

- DVD cover
- Genre: Holiday romance
- Screenplay by: Bill Wells; J. B. White
- Story by: Bill Wells
- Directed by: Mark Jean
- Starring: Kellie Martin; Cameron Mathison; Jewel Staite
- Theme music composer: Michael Richard Plowman
- Countries of origin: United States; Canada
- Original language: English

Production
- Producer: Harvey Kahn
- Cinematography: Mathias Herndl
- Editor: Richard Schwadel
- Production company: Hallmark Channel

Original release
- Network: Hallmark Channel
- Release: November 16, 2013

The Christmas Ornament is a 2013 American/Canadian holiday romance television film directed by Mark Jean and starring Kellie Martin, Cameron Mathison, and Jewel Staite. Written by Bill Wells and J. B. White, the film is about a young widow unable to celebrate Christmas because of the memories that it evokes, until she meets a Christmas tree shop owner who helps her start her own cookie business and rediscover the spirit of the season.

== Plot ==
A young widow, Kathy (Kellie Martin), is not putting up a Christmas tree this year. For years, she and her recently deceased husband gave each other Christmas ornaments as gifts that represented their love for each other. Now she keeps those ornaments locked away in order to avoid memories of her tragic loss. The only holiday tradition she observes now is baking Christmas cookies for her friends, which she's been doing since childhood.

Shortly before Christmas, Kathy meets a handsome Christmas tree shop owner, Tim (Cameron Mathison), who tries to sell her a tree, but is initially unsuccessful. The two are attracted to each other, and soon she accepts a tree from him as a gift, as well as an ornament that symbolizes hope for her. She helps him deliver his trees, and he helps her start a new cookie business—something she's always dreamed of doing—and brings the joy of the Christmas season back into her life.

Supported by her best friend, Jenna (Jewel Staite), and her newfound feelings of love for Tim, Kathy starts to accept the message of hope symbolized by Tim's ornament. Their relationship, however, is complicated by her memories of her husband and by Tim's ex-girlfriend, Rebecca, who comes back into his life unexpectedly. As Christmas approaches, they come to realize how much their love means to each other and their future together.

== Cast ==
- Kellie Martin as Kathy, a widow who runs her late husband's cycle store and has a passion for baking
- Cameron Mathison as Tim Pierce, an attractive single guy who runs a Christmas tree lot and a Christmas shop
- Jewel Staite as Jenna, Kathy's best friend who wants Kathy to leave her past behind
- Matthew Kevin Anderson as Ben Lowe, Jenna's husband
- Brendan Meyer as Connor, Tim's nephew who helps him at the tree lot
- Laura Mennell as Rebecca, Tim's ex-girlfriend who left him unexpectedly
- Nicole Oliver as Sarah, Tim's sister and Connor's mother
- Nels Lennarson as Dale, Tim's brother-in-law
- Cole Vigue as Graham, the only employee at Kathy's cycle store
- Stephen Dimopoulos as Mario, a businessman who has been wanting to buy Kathy's lease on the cycle store
- Gwynyth Walsh as Eve, Kathy's accountant

== Release ==
The Christmas Ornament first aired on the Hallmark Channel on November 16, 2013.

== Critical response ==
In her review for the DVD Verdict website, Dawn Hunt gave the film a positive notice, writing that it combines the joys of Christmas with a gradually developing love story. The film's effectiveness, according to Hunt, is due to the chemistry of the leading actors and the performances of a strong supporting cast. Hunt concluded:

This film works because it isn't about falling in love again. It's about accepting it can happen. The Christmas Ornament is a slow building film, and the fact the filmmakers aren't trying to convince us this couple is anything but two people who recognize the potential for their relationship to be more is a major selling point. Care is taken to infuse as much believability within the storyline as possible, relying as much on the characters as the situations in which they're placed. ... The Christmas Ornament is as much about learning to open yourself up to life as it is finding a new relationship to cherish.
