= Game of Homes =

- Presented by: Cameron Mathison (season 1); Dave Salmoni (season 2)
- Country of origin: Canada
- Original language: English
- No. of series: 2
- No. of episodes: 16

Production
- Running time: 45 min.
- Production company: Corus Entertainment

Original release
- Network: W Network
- Release: March 17, 2015 – present

Game of Homes is a Canadian reality television series, which premiered on W Network on March 17, 2015. Hosted by Cameron Mathison in season 1 and Dave Salmoni in season 2, the series features four couples per season who are competing to renovate four rundown houses. Season 1 is based in Vancouver, while the show moves to Toronto for season 2.

In conjunction with the series, Corus Entertainment also produced a shorter web series, Cameron's House Rules, which profiles Mathison doing renovation projects on his own home.

== Broadcast ==
In Australia, the series premiered on 6 August 2015 on LifeStyle Home. The show aired in the United States on Discovery Family from September 6, 2016 to October 23, 2017.
