= List of American network TV daytime talk programs =

This is a listing of some American television network talk shows currently airing or have aired during daytime.

== Current ==
Daytime talk programming begins at 5:00 pm or earlier Eastern Time Zone/Pacific Time Zone, after network affiliates' late local news.

Broadcast
Network	Program title	Duration	Days	Current host(s)/anchor(s)	Debut
ABC	GMA3	60 minutes (with commercials)	Weekdays	DeMarco Morgan & Eva Pilgrim	September 10, 2018
ABC	The View	60 minutes (with commercials)	Weekdays	Joy Behar, Whoopi Goldberg, Sara Haines, Sunny Hostin, Ana Navarro, and Alyssa Farah Griffin	August 11, 1997
NBC	NBC News Daily	60 minutes (with commercials)	Weekdays	Kate Snow, Aaron Gilchrist, Vicky Nguyen, and Morgan Radford	September 12, 2022
NBC	Today with Jenna & Sheinelle	60 minutes (with commercials)	Weekdays	Jenna Bush Hager, Sheinelle Jones	April 7, 2008
Syndication	The Drew Barrymore Show	60 minutes (with commercials)	Weekdays	Drew Barrymore	September 14, 2020
Syndication	The Jennifer Hudson Show	60 minutes (with commercials)	Weekdays	Jennifer Hudson	September 12, 2022
Syndication	Live with Kelly and Mark	60 minutes (with commercials)	Weekdays	Kelly Ripa & Mark Consuelos	April 4, 1983
Syndication	Tamron Hall	60 minutes (with commercials)	Weekdays	Tamron Hall	September 9, 2019
Syndication	TMZ Live	60 minutes (with commercials)	Weekdays	Harvey Levin & Adam Glyn	September 9, 2013
Telemundo	Suelta la sopa (Spanish for Drop the soup)	60 minutes (with commercials)	Weekdays	N/A	
Univision	El Gordo y la Flaca (Spanish for The Fat Man and the Skinny Woman)	60 minutes (with commercials)	Weekdays	Lili Estefan and Raúl De Molina	September 21, 1998
UniMas	¿Quién Tiene la Razón? (Spanish for Who's Right?)	60 minutes (with commercials)	Weekdays	Carmen Jara	July 7, 2003
UniMas	Casos de Familia (Spanish for Family Affairs)	60 minutes (with commercials)	Weekdays	Fifi Torralbas	January 26, 2004
Cable/satellite		60 minutes (with commercials)	Weekdays		
Facebook Watch	Steve	60 minutes (with commercials)	Weekdays	Steve Harvey	September 5, 2017

== Former ==
=== Broadcast networks ===
==== CBS ====
- Vanity Fair (October 12, 1948 – November 2, 1951)
- Art Linkletter's House Party (September 1, 1952 – September 5, 1969)
- The Barbara De Angelis Show (Winter 1991)
- The Talk (October 18, 2010 – December 20, 2024)

==== ABC ====
- The Dick Cavett Show (March 4, 1968 – January 24, 1969)
- Home (January 18, 1988 – April 8, 1994)
- Mike and Maty (April 11, 1994 – June 7, 1996)
- Caryl & Marilyn: Real Friends (June 10, 1996 – May 30, 1997)
- The Revolution (January 16 – July 6, 2012)
- The Chew (September 26, 2011 – June 28, 2018)

==== NBC ====
- The Betty White Show (February 8, 1954 – December 31, 1954), began as a local show in Los Angeles in 1951
- Home (March 1, 1954 – August 9, 1957)
- The Merv Griffin Show (October 1, 1962 – March 29, 1963)
- Dinah's Place (1970 – 1974)
- The David Letterman Show (June 23 – October 24, 1980)
- The Regis Philbin Show (November 30, 1981 – April 9, 1982)
- The Marsha Warfield Show (March 26, 1990 – January 25, 1991)
- Leeza (January 17, 1994 – September 3, 1999)
- Later Today (September 7, 1999 – August 11, 2000)
- Megyn Kelly Today (September 25, 2017 – October 24, 2018)

==== The CW ====
- Lifechangers (September 19, 2011 – May 18, 2012)
- The Bill Cunningham Show (September 17, 2012 – September 9, 2016), the first season premiered in syndication on September 19, 2011 before moving to The CW Daytime the following season
- The Robert Irvine Show (September 12, 2016 – May 24, 2018)

==== Westinghouse Group/Group W ====
- The Mike Douglas Show (1963–1980), began as a local show in Cleveland in 1961.
- The John Davidson Show (1980–1982)
- The Chuck Woolery Show (September 12, 1994 – September 5, 1997)
- The Wil Shriner Show (1986–1987)
- House Party; talk show hosted by Steve Doocy (1990; co-production with NBC Productions)
- Vicki!, talk show hosted by Vicki Lawrence (1992–1994)
- Marilu, talk show hosted by Marilu Henner (1994–1995)

==== Other syndicators ====
- The Phil Donahue Show (November 6, 1967 – September 13, 1996), local show until 1970.
- Not for Women Only with Barbara Walters (1972 – 1976), began as local show on WNBC New York in 1971
- Dinah! (October 27, 1974 – October 10, 1980)
- Sally (October 17, 1983 – May 24, 2002)
- The Oprah Winfrey Show (September 8, 1986 – May 25, 2011)
- Geraldo/The Geraldo Rivera Show (September 7, 1987 – May 8, 1998)
- The Joan Rivers Show (September 5, 1989 – December 26, 1993)
- The Montel Williams Show (July 8, 1991 – May 16, 2008)
- Maury (September 9, 1991 – September 8, 2022)
- The Jenny Jones Show (September 16, 1991 – May 21, 2003)
- The Jerry Springer Show (September 30, 1991 – July 26, 2018)
- The Charlie Rose Show (September 30, 1991 – November 17, 2017)
- The Les Brown Show (September 6, 1993 – January 14, 1994)
- Ricki Lake (September 13, 1993 – May 21, 2004)
- Rolonda (January 17, 1994 – May 18, 1997)
- The Gordon Elliott Show (September 12, 1994 – September 5, 1997)
- The Charles Perez Show (December 12, 1994 – January 26, 1996)
- The Tempestt Bledsoe Show (September 7, 1995 – June 5, 1996)
- The Rosie O'Donnell Show (June 10, 1996 – May 22, 2002)
- Forgive or Forget (June 8, 1998 – May 26, 2000)
- The Howie Mandel Show (June 22, 1998 – April 1999)
- The Roseanne Show (September 14, 1998 – June 23, 2000)
- Donny & Marie (September 21, 1998 – May 19, 2000)
- The Martin Short Show (September 13, 1999 – November 17, 2000)
- The Queen Latifah Show (first incarnation) (September 13, 1999 – August 31, 2001)
- Dr. Phil (September 16, 2002 – May 25, 2023)
- The Ellen DeGeneres Show (September 8, 2003 – May 26, 2022)
- The Sharon Osbourne Show (September 15, 2003 – May 21, 2004)
- Living It Up! with Ali & Jack (September 15, 2003 – May 7, 2004)
- The Tony Danza Show (September 13, 2004 – May 26, 2006)
- The Tyra Banks Show (September 12, 2005 – May 28, 2010)
- The Martha Stewart Show (September 12, 2005 – May 11, 2012)
- Rachael Ray (September 18, 2006 – July 28, 2023)
- The Greg Behrendt Show (September 12, 2006 – February 28, 2007)
- The Megan Mullally Show (September 18, 2006 – January 9, 2007)
- The Steve Wilkos Show (September 2007 - 2026)
- The Wendy Williams Show (July 14, 2008 – June 17, 2022)
- The Doctors (September 8, 2008 – August 8, 2022)
- The Bonnie Hunt Show (September 8, 2008 – May 26, 2010)
- The Dr. Oz Show (September 14, 2009 – January 14, 2022)
- Access Daily with Mario & Kit (September 13, 2010 – September 10, 2026)
- The Nate Berkus Show (September 13, 2010 – May 24, 2012)
- Anderson Live (September 12, 2011 – May 20, 2013)
- The Jeremy Kyle Show (September 19, 2011 – May 21, 2013)
- Bethenny (June 11, 2012 – July 4, 2014)
- Steve Harvey (September 4, 2012 – July 13, 2017)
- The Ricki Lake Show (September 10, 2012 – June 19, 2013)
- The Jeff Probst Show (September 10, 2012 – September 4, 2013)
- Katie (September 10, 2012 – July 30, 2014)
- The Trisha Goddard Show (September 17, 2012 – May 21, 2014)
- The Real (July 15, 2013 – June 3, 2022)
- The Test (September 9, 2013 – May 2014)
- The Queen Latifah Show (second incarnation) (September 16, 2013 – March 6, 2015)
- The Meredith Vieira Show (September 8, 2014 – May 20, 2016)
- FABLife (September 14, 2015 – June 22, 2016)
- Harry (September 12, 2016 – May 23, 2018)
- Steve (September 5, 2017 – June 26, 2019)
- Daily Blast Live (September 11, 2017 – September 6, 2024)
- Pickler & Ben (September 18, 2017 – May 22, 2019)
- Face the Truth (September 10, 2018 – May 22, 2019)
- The Kelly Clarkson Show (September 9, 2019 - August 31, 2026)
- Sherri (talk show) (September 12, 2022 - May 21, 2026)
- Nick Cannon (September 27, 2021 – May 27, 2022)
- The Good Dish (January 17 – May 25, 2022)
- Karamo (talk show) (September 19, 2022 - May 26, 2026)
