= The Venery of Samantha Bird =

Upcoming American television drama series

- Genre: Drama
- Created by: Anna Moriarty
- Written by: Anna Moriarty
- Starring: Katherine Langford; Finn Jones; Francesca Reale; Brenda Strong; Adam Faison; Shalini Bathina; Tyrone Brown; Henry Czerny; Doug Savant
- Country of origin: United States
- Original language: English
- No. of seasons: 1
- No. of episodes: 6 (all unaired, with 2 never produced episodes)

Production
- Executive producers: Anna Moriarty; Salvatore Stabile; Jessica Rhoades; Rachel Polan; Jessica Yu; Larysa Kondracki; Nicole Jefferson Asher
- Production companies: Pacesetter Productions; Brooklynwood Productions; Lionsgate Television; Paramount Television Studios

The Venery of Samantha Bird is an unaired drama television show.

== Premise ==
Samantha Bird is visiting family in New England and reconnects with her childhood sweetheart; she falls headlong into a seemingly perfect storybook romance.

== Cast ==
- Katherine Langford as Samantha Bird
- Finn Jones as Jake Minot, a former childhood lover of Samantha Bird.
- Francesca Reale as Ellie Bird
- Brenda Strong as Nan Bird, Sam's mother
- Adam Faison as Nigel, a local New Hampshire-based podcaster, and close friend of Ellie Bird.
- Shalini Bathina as Dr. Priyanka Yalen, therapist
- Tyrone Brown as Gideon Yalen, Priyanka's husband who has concerns about Jake
- Henry Czerny as Teddy Bird, Samantha Bird's father
- Doug Savant as Al Minot, a successful businessman

== Production ==
In September 2020, Variety magazine exclusively reported Starz is in early development on a drama with Anna Moriarty as producer and writer in her premiere television credit.

In October 2022, Deadline Hollywood revealed that Starz had given a series order to the drama television series with Katherine Langford attached to star.

In January 2023, Finn Jones, Francesca Reale, Embeth Davidtz, Brenda Strong, Adam Faison, Shalini Bathina, and Tyrone Marshall Brown, were cast in the series. Larysa Kondracki signed on to direct four episodes and serve as executive director, and Nicole Jefferson Asher joined as producer.

In February 2023, Henry Czerny and Doug Savant were cast in recurring roles.

Production started on January 2, 2023, in Montreal. with a scheduled ending in May 2023. In May 2023, Deadline Hollywood exclusively reported that the television series had filmed six episodes before it was forced to pause production due to 2023 Writers Guild of America strike.

In September 2023, it was announced that the series would not resume filming following the resolution of the 2023 Writers Guild of America strike, with Starz no longer moving forward with the series.
