= Cameron Mathison =

Canadian-American actor (born 1969)

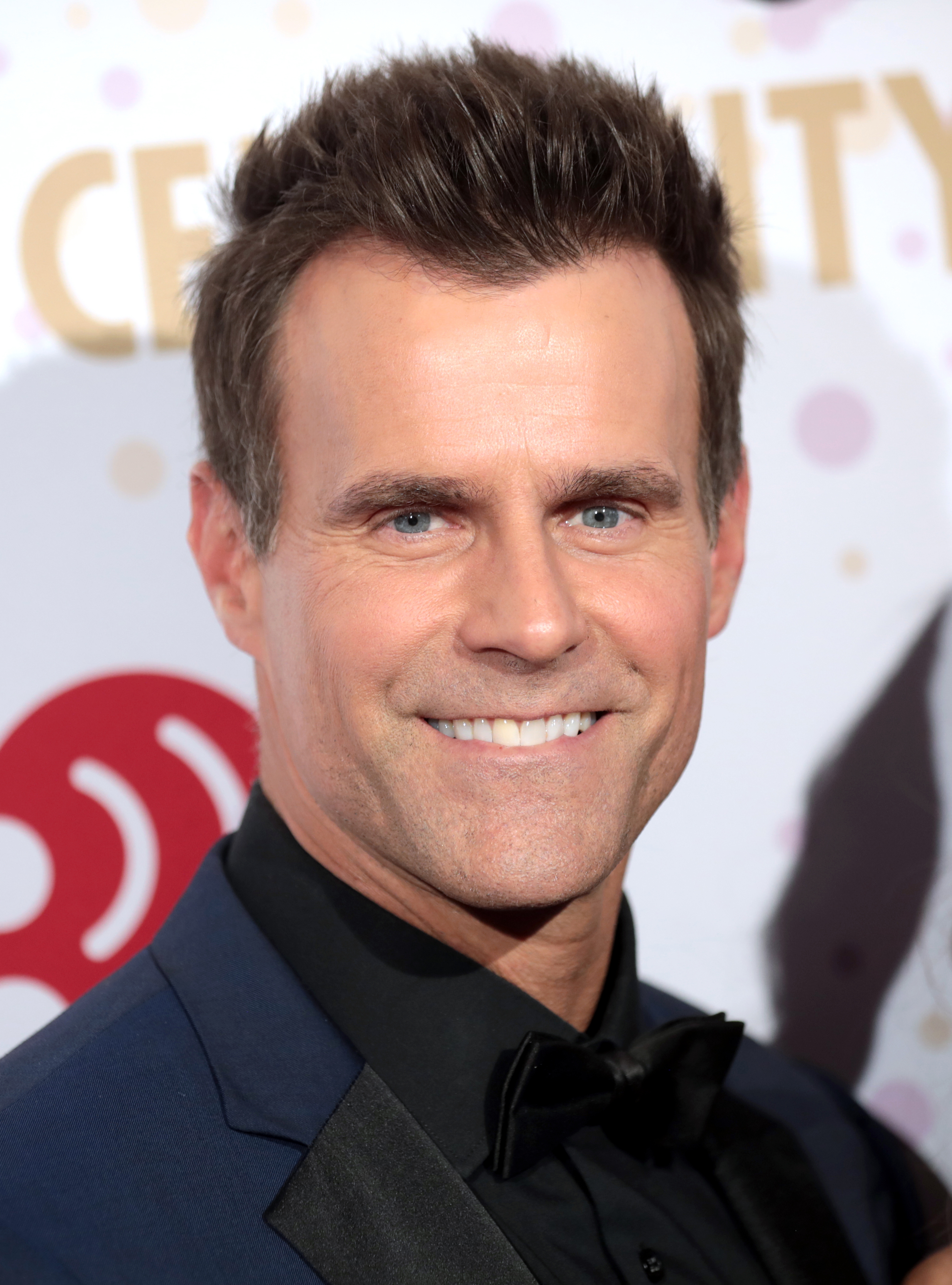
- Mathison in 2022
- Born: Cameron Arthur Mathison; August 25, 1969 (age 57); Sarnia, Ontario, Canada
- Education: McGill University
- Occupation: Actor
- Years active: 1997–present
- Spouse: Vanessa Mathison (m. 2002; sep. 2024)
- Children: 2

Cameron Arthur Mathison (born August 25, 1969) is a Canadian-American actor and television host. From 1997 to 2011, he played Ryan Lavery in All My Children. Since 2021, he has portrayed the role of Drew Cain on General Hospital. He has also had numerous roles in various Hallmark movies.

== Early life ==
Mathison was born on August 25, 1969 in Sarnia, Ontario, Canada, the second of two sons of parents Bill and Loretta. Mathison attended Thornlea Secondary School in Thornhill, Ontario and McGill University in Montreal, Quebec where he captained the McGill Redmen men's basketball team. He graduated in 1993 with a bachelor's degree in Civil Engineering.

== Career ==
After graduating from McGill, he began working as a model and started acting in commercials in Canada, the U.S. and Europe. This led to taking acting classes and the beginning of his acting career in Toronto.

Mathison made his film debut in 54. He followed up this appearance with a leading role in the Canadian independent film Washed Up. In December 1997, he was hired to play the role of Ryan Lavery on All My Children filming his first scenes on December 15. Mathison first appeared on-screen in the January 12, 1998 episode.

Mathison won the Soap Opera Digest Award for Outstanding Male Newcomer in 1999 and earned Daytime Emmy Award nominations for Outstanding Supporting Actor in 2002 and 2005. In 2000, Mathison was named by People magazine as one of "America's 100 Most Eligible Bachelors".

In 2007, Mathison participated on the fifth season of Dancing with the Stars where he placed 5th with pro Edyta Śliwińska.

After working freelance with Good Morning America for several years, Mathison signed with GMA in January 2009 as a regular correspondent. Mathison worked on many events for GMA: The Oscars, Grammys, Golden Globes, American Music Awards, MTV Movie Awards, MTV Video Music Awards, and the Country Music Awards. Mathison continued to work as a host and correspondent for GMA, the Emmy-nominated series Ultimate Proposal, and the renovation reality show Game of Homes.

Mathison also continues to act in both comedic and dramatic roles. He has appeared on Castle, Desperate Housewives, Hot in Cleveland, Drop Dead Diva, the EXes, and numerous independent and television films. In 2014, Mathison joined the Hallmark/Crown Media family. Mathison appeared in 8 movies based on the Murder She Baked novels starring opposite Alison Sweeney.

In April 2015, Mathison signed with CBS's Entertainment Tonight. He currently serves as a full-time correspondent and weekend co-anchor for the entertainment news magazine. On July 26, 2018, Mathison was named the new co-host of Home & Family, alongside Debbie Matenopoulos; he assumed his position in September with the launch of the seventh season.

In April 2021, Deadline Hollywood announced Mathison had joined the cast of General Hospital as "Drew Cain". He debuted in the role in the final moments of the August 16, 2021 episode.

In November 2023, it was announced that Mathison had signed a multi-picture deal with Great American Family over the next several years, moving on from the Murder, She Baked movie series and Hallmark.

== Personal life ==
On July 27, 2002, he married model Vanessa Marie Arevalo, having proposed in Vail, Colorado. They have two children; a son born in April 2003 and a daughter born in July 2006. On July 31, 2024, four days after their 22nd wedding anniversary, Arevalo and Mathison announced their separation. In May 2026, Mathison filed for legal separation.

He has been practising Buddhism for 15 years and is a devotee of Kelsang Gyatso.

On September 9, 2019, he announced that he had been diagnosed with renal cell carcinoma and would be taking several weeks off to receive treatment. In January 2025, his home in Altadena, California burned down due to the Eaton Fire.

== Filmography ==
=== Film ===
Year	Title	Role	Notes
1998	54	Atlanta	Miramax
2000	Washed Up	Conman	Independent
2013	The Surrogate	Jacob Kelly	Independent

=== Television ===
Year	Title	Role	Notes
1997	Any Mother's Son	Rich Eastman	Television film
1997	F/X: The Series	Masked Man	Episode: "House of Horrors"
1998	The Defenders: Choice of Evils	Mike Murphy	Television film
1998–2011	All My Children	Ryan Lavery	ABC-TV
2002	The Job	Brad	Episode: "Telescope"
2002	The Drew Carey Show	Kirk	Episode: "Kate's Wedding"
2003	CSI: Crime Scene Investigation	Danny Pasqualle	Episode: "Recipe for Murder"
2003	JAG	Lt. Stanley Mitchell	Episode: "Empty Quiver"
2003	What I Like About You	Noah	Episode: "The Fix Up"
2003	See Jane Date	Gary Babcock	Television film
2004	Hope & Faith	Dillon Smith	3 episodes
2004–2007	I Wanna Be a Soap Star	Host	Soapnet
2006	Daytime Emmy Awards	Host	ABC-TV
2006–2008	Instant Beauty Pageant	Host	Style Network
2008	Your Place or Mine	Host	TLC
2008	Daytime Emmy Awards	Host	ABC-TV
2009–2015	Good Morning America	Correspondent & Host	ABC-TV
2011	Castle	Vince Powers	Episode: "One Life to Lose"
2012	Desperate Housewives	Greg	Episode: "What's the Good of Being Good"
2012	Drop Dead Diva	Jonah Pierce	Episode: "Pick's and Pakes"
2012	The Wife He Met Online	Bryant Meyers	Lifetime TV Movie
2013	The Carpenter's Miracle	Josh Camden	Television film
2013	The Christmas Ornament	Tim Pierce	Hallmark Channel television film
2013	Window Wonderland	Kenneth	Hallmark Channel television film
2013	Holidaze	Carter	Television film
2013	Hot in Cleveland	Bill	Episode: "The Anger Games"
2013	Belle's	PR Rep	Episode: "One Big Happy Family"
2014	Game of Homes	Host	W Network
2014	The Exes	Rob Lutz	Episode: "Oh Brother Here Art Thou"
2014	Along Came a Nanny	Mike Logan	Hallmark Movies & Mysteries television film
2014	My Gal Sunday	Henry Parker	Hallmark Movies & Mysteries television film
2015–2017	Murder, She Baked series	Mike Kingston	Hallmark Movies & Mysteries television film series; 5 films
2016	A Christmas To Remember	John Blake	Hallmark Movies & Mysteries television film
2017	At Home in Mitford	Tim Kavanaugh	Hallmark Channel television film
2018	Very, Very Valentine	Henry	Hallmark Channel television film
2018	A Summer to Remember	Will	Hallmark Channel TV Movie
2018–2021	Home and Family	Co-host	Hallmark Channel
2018	Love, Of Course	Noah Ferris	Hallmark Channel television film
2019	The Christmas Club	Edward Taylor	Hallmark Channel television film
2021–present	General Hospital	Drew Cain	
2021–2023	Hannah Swensen Mysteries	Mike Kingston	Hallmark Movies & Mysteries television film series (3 films)
2021	A Kindhearted Christmas	Scott Morris	Great American Family television film
2022	A Merry Christmas Wish	Dylan	Great American Family television film
2024-2025	Beat the Bridge	Host	Game Show Network
2024	Home Sweet Christmas	Sam Stackhouse	Great American Family

=== Web ===
Year	Title	Role	Notes
2011–2012	Ultimate Proposal	Host	Fishbowl Media
2012	Dallas Behind the Scenes	Host	TNT
2012–2013	Backstage Pass to the Oscars	Host	

Preceded by Billy Miller	Drew Cain (role); 2021–present	Succeeded by incumbent
Awards and achievements
Preceded by Billy Ray Cyrus & Karina Smirnoff	Dancing with the Stars (US) quarter-finalist Season 5 (Fall 2007 with Edyta Sliwinska)	Succeeded by Mario & Karina Smirnoff
