= List of American television series impacted by the COVID-19 pandemic =

The COVID-19 pandemic had a major impact on American television. The pandemic led to the suspension of most television production from mid-March 2020 until 2023, in the largest disruption to U.S. television production since the 2007–08 Writers Guild of America strike. This article list American television productions that were affected by the pandemic.

== Production suspended, postponed or modified ==
These tables include series that adopted remotely-filmed and home-based productions for one or more episodes, or resumed studio-based production with additional safety protocols, such as reduced staff, absence of studio audience, alternate locations, or visible social distancing.

=== Unscripted ===
| Name | Network | Reason | Source |
|---|---|---|---|
| The $100,000 Pyramid | ABC | Season 5 airing postponed to May 2021, and filmed with no studio audience. | |
| The Amazing Race | CBS | Season 33 production suspended in Glasgow, Scotland on February 28, 2020, after three of the twelve originally-planned legs less than a week into a three-week production run, sending contestants home. Filming resumed in September 2021, in St. Gallen, Switzerland into an alternative modified route, and was scheduled for a January 5, 2022 premiere. The premiere of season 32 was delayed from May 20, 2020, to CBS's fall lineup, with game show Game On! scheduled as a replacement. | |
| America's Funniest Home Videos | ABC | Final episodes of season 30 filmed with no studio audience. The special episode AFV@Home, was also remotely-produced at host Alfonso Ribeiro's home. Season 31 premiered on October 18, 2020. | |
| America's Got Talent | NBC | Season 15 auditions filming suspended on March 14, 2020; still premiered as scheduled; resumed filming of "Judge Cuts" round in a modified, remote format in June 2020. Live rounds were broadcast from Universal Studios Hollywood with a virtual audience and a mix of in-person and remote performances. To compensate for the format changes, the live rounds also expanded to four semi-final heats rather than three as in previous seasons. Season 16 returned to hosting in-person auditions with a reduced audience (using stock footage and audio from previous seasons to sweeten the footage), while live shows returned to Dolby Theatre as normal with vaccinated audience members. | |
| American Idol | ABC | Season 18 live shows suspended; competition resumed in a remote format beginning on April 26, 2020. In-studio production resumed for season 19, with the live rounds conducted before a reduced studio audience. | |
| American Ninja Warrior | NBC | Season 12 production postponed. Entire season was filmed behind closed doors at The Dome at America's Center in St. Louis over four weeks in June–July 2020, rescheduled to a fall premiere. | |
| American Song Contest | NBC | Season 1 postponed by one month to March 2022, citing concerns regarding Omicron variant (with America's Got Talent: Extreme filling its space on NBC's schedule). | |
| The Bachelor | ABC | Season 25 began production in September 2020; filming began in October 2020 at the Nemacolin Woodlands Resort in Farmington, Pennsylvania. | |
| Bachelor in Paradise | ABC | Season 7 production postponed to June 2021. | |
| The Bachelorette | ABC | Season 16 pre-production suspended on March 13, 2020. Filming began in July 2020 for a fall premiere. The entire season was filmed at the La Quinta Resort & Club in La Quinta, California. Season 17 was filmed at Hyatt Regency Tamaya Resort & Spa in Santa Ana Pueblo, New Mexico. Season 18 was filmed in July 2021 at Renaissance Esmeralda Resort in Indian Wells, California and moved halfway to Minneapolis, Minnesota. | |
| BattleBots | Discovery | Season 10 postponed to December 2020. | |
| Big Brother | CBS | Season 22 postponed to August 2020, live eviction shows conducted with no studio audience. Season 23 filmed with no studio audience, while season 24 was filmed with no studio audience in the first six weeks, in-person audiences returned on August 18, 2022 during that season. However, season 25 premiered without a studio audience on August 2, 2023. The season's first live eviction episode on August 10, 2023 featured a studio audience. | |
| Card Sharks | ABC | Season 2 postponed to October 2020, and filmed with no studio audience. Season 3 filmed with no studio audience. | |
| The Challenge | MTV | Season 36 postponed to December 2020. | |
| Dancing with the Stars | ABC | Season 29 aired live with no studio audience. | |
| Diners, Drive-Ins and Dives | Food Network | On-location filming suspended; subsequent episodes were filmed with a remotely-produced format billed as Triple D Takeout, where restaurant chefs guide host Guy Fieri in preparing their dishes from meal kits sent to his home. | |
| Escape the Night | YouTube Originals | Season 5 production postponed. | |
| Family Feud | First-run syndication | Production of 2020–21 season began shortly before the pandemic, and suspended after selected Los Angeles-based episodes were filmed with no studio audience in March 2020. Production relocated to Trilith Studios in Fayetteville, Georgia, and resumed in August 2020; with set modifications for physical distance and no studio audience. Studio audiences returned for the 2022–23 season. | |
| Friends: The Reunion | HBO Max | Production postponed to April 2021. | |
| The Golden Bachelor | ABC | Casting for the inaugural season was supposed to begin in April 2020, but postponed to May 2023. Production commenced in June 2023. | |
| Guy's Grocery Games | Food Network | Filmed home-produced episodes, including remote episodes where challenges were conducted by chefs using packages of ingredients shipped to their homes, and episodes where host Guy Fieri attempts to cook meals within limitations inspired by challenges from previous episodes. Returned to in-studio production in mid-2021. | |
| Hollywood Game Night | NBC | Filmed a home-based "Social Distancing Edition" special for Red Nose Day that aired on May 12, 2020, but otherwise continued airing new episodes as normal in June 2020. | |
| I Can See Your Voice | Fox | Production suspended after one episode filmed, resumed with no audience in August 2020. | |
| Jeopardy! | First-run syndication | Season 36 ended early after 190 of 230 episodes, and 40 episodes from that season were cancelled. Season 37 premiered as scheduled in September 2020, with set modifications for physical distance and no studio audience (which continued into season 38). Production further suspended three weeks by the death of host Alex Trebek. Incumbent champion at time of March taping suspension did not return until December taping. Season 39 returned to featuring a studio audience with Ken Jennings as host. | |
| Legendary | HBO Max | Finale filmed with no studio audience on July 9, 2020. Season 2 premiered on May 6, 2021. | |
| Let's Make a Deal | CBS | One season 11 episode promoting the 74th Tony Awards scheduled to air June 5, 2020, was withheld until September 24, 2021, in season 13 due to the Tony Awards' postponement to that date. Season 12 production delayed, resumed with set modifications for physical distance and a reduced studio audience. Deals are also played with remote contestants in a virtual audience from season 12 to season 14. Aired a primetime special with essential workers as contestants on October 27, 2020, ahead of its daytime premiere on November 16, 2020. Production briefly suspended in January 2021 pursuant to recommendations by the LACDPH. | |
| Love Island | CBS | Season 2 postponed to August 2020, when the production moved from Fiji to The Cromwell Las Vegas. Season 3 was filmed in Hawaii. | |
| The Masked Dancer | Fox | Production postponed until October 2020. | |
| The Masked Singer | Fox | Season 4 production relocated to Red Studios Hollywood, with logistical modifications. | |
| MasterChef | Fox | Season 11 suspended filming in March 2020, after planned ten episodes had filmed and resumed in October 2020 with health and safety protocols. | |
| MasterChef Junior | Fox | Season 8 premiere postponed from summer 2020 to spring 2022, delayed indefinitely in favor of I Can See Your Voice. It premiered on March 17, 2022. | |
| Operación Triunfo | RTVE | Series 11 of the show was temporarily suspended for two months, and the remaining contestants sent home as a precautionary measure. Since series 11 onwards, the series was produced without live audience. | |
| The Price Is Right | CBS | Season 48 ended early after 164 of 190 episodes. 26 episodes from that season were cancelled. Season 49 production delayed, resumed with set modifications for physical distance and no studio audience. After a primetime special on October 27 with essential workers as contestants, season 49 premiered in daytime on November 16, 2020. Production was briefly suspended in January 2021 pursuant to recommendations by the LACDPH. Season 50 restored a partial studio audience, before returning to a full studio audience in season 52, which featured a new venue. | |
| The Real Housewives of Atlanta | Bravo | Season 12 reunion postponed on March 16, 2020, and filmed remotely on April 23, 2020. Season 13 began filming in mid-July 2020. In November of the same year, production on the series was halted after a crew member had a COVID-19 infection; production resumed the following month. | |
| RuPaul's Drag Race | VH1 | Season 12 finale and reunion conducted in a remote format. Season 13 filmed with protocols in place. | |
| Shark Tank | ABC | Production relocated to a quarantined "bubble" in Las Vegas. | |
| So You Think You Can Dance | Fox | Season 17 was preparing to begin production in March 2020, but was postponed indefinitely. Production rescheduled to March 2022 with a premiere date for the summer of that year. | |
| Supermarket Sweep | ABC | 2020 revival filmed with no studio audience and reduced personnel. | |
| Survivor | CBS | Season 40 (Winners at War) live season finale conducted in a remote format. Production for seasons 41 and 42 postponed to April 2021 and filmed with protocols in place for the crew, contestants, and people of Fiji. | |
| The Voice (English) | NBC | Season 18 production suspended; playoffs conducted in a remote format beginning on May 4, 2020. In-studio production resumed for season 19 with no studio audience. | |
| The Voice (Spanish) | Telemundo | Season 2 production suspended in March 2020, and resumed in July 2020 with no studio audience. As the Spanish-language version produced in Florida (unlike its English counterpart), Film Florida rules allowed production to resume in-studio. | |
| Wheel of Fortune | First-run syndication | Season 37 ended early with 167 of 195 episodes. 28 episodes from that season were cancelled. Season 38 premiered as scheduled in September 2020 with set modifications for physical distance and no studio audience. | |
| Who Wants to Be a Millionaire | ABC | 2020 primetime revival filmed with no studio audience; the "Ask the Audience" lifeline was replaced with "Ask the Host". | |

=== Scripted ===
| Program | Network | Reason | Source |
|---|---|---|---|
| Alien: Earth | FX | Production postponed. | |
| American Crime Story | FX | Season 3 production suspended. | |
| American Horror Story | FX | Season 10 production postponed. | |
| Angelyne | Peacock | Production postponed. | |
| Animal Kingdom | TNT | Season 5 production suspended. | |
| Atlanta | FX | Season 3 production postponed. | |
| Barry | HBO | Season 3 pre-production suspended. | |
| Big Shot | Disney+ | Production suspended. | |
| Big Sky | ABC | Production postponed after casting was completed, filming relocated to Vancouver and resumed on August 24, 2020. | |
| Billions | Showtime | Season 5 production suspended, aired a partial season. | |
| Black Monday | Showtime | Season 2 production suspended, aired a partial season. | |
| The Bold and the Beautiful | CBS | Production suspended. Production resumed June 17, 2020, and first-run episodes resumed July 20. First U.S. soap and first U.S. scripted television series to resume production and first-run episodes. | |
| The Brides | ABC | Production and casting halted, later canceled. | |
| Britannia | Amazon Prime Video | Production suspended. | |
| Brooklyn Nine-Nine | NBC | Season 8 production postponed and premiere delayed until 2021. | |
| Call Me Kat | Fox | Filmed with no studio audience. | |
| Carnival Row | Prime Video | Production suspended. | |
| Chucky | Syfy | Production suspended. | |
| Claws | TNT | Production postponed. | |
| Clickbait | Netflix | Production suspended. | |
| The Conners | ABC | Season 3 production resumed on August 17, 2020. | |
| Daisy Jones & the Six | Prime Video | Production postponed. | |
| Days of Our Lives | NBC | Production suspended. Resumed on September 1, 2020. | |
| Doom Patrol | HBO Max | Season 2 production suspended. | |
| Euphoria | HBO | Season 2 filming was due to begin in the second quarter of 2020, but was postponed to 2021. | |
| The Falcon and the Winter Soldier | Disney+ | Filming suspended; series premiere postponed from August 2020 to late 2020, and again to March 19, 2021. Filming resumed in September 2020. | |
| Fargo | FX | Season 4 premiere postponed to September 27, 2020. | |
| Fear the Walking Dead | AMC | Season 6 post-production postponed. | |
| For All Mankind | Apple TV+ | Production suspended. | |
| The Flight Attendant | HBO Max | Production suspended. | |
| Foundation | Apple TV+ | Pre-production completed, filming postponed. | |
| General Hospital | ABC | Production suspended until July 22, 2020, first-run episodes resumed August 3. | |
| Genius | National Geographic | Production suspended. | |
| The Good Doctor | ABC | Season 4 production halted. Resumed on September 2, 2020. | |
| Gossip Girl | HBO Max | Production postponed. | |
| Grace and Frankie | Netflix | Production suspended. | |
| The Handmaid's Tale | Hulu | Production suspended. | |
| High School Musical: The Musical: The Series | Disney+ | Season 2 production suspended. | |
| Home Before Dark | Apple TV+ | Season 2 filming suspended. Resumed on September 14. | |
| Jake Chang | The CW | Production canceled. | |
| Kevin Can F*** Himself | AMC | Production suspended. | |
| The Lincoln Lawyer | CBS | Pilot production suspended after pre-production was nearly completed, but CBS decided to cancel the project. It was given a series order by Netflix in January 2021. | |
| Lisey's Story | Apple TV+ | Production suspended. | |
| Little America | Apple TV+ | Production suspended. | |
| Loki | Disney+ | Filming suspended. Resumed in September 2020. | |
| The Lost Boys | The CW | Pilot production suspended, later canceled. | |
| Lucifer | Netflix | Season 5 finale production suspended, remaining episodes premiered in 2021. | |
| Monarch | Fox | Season 1 premiere postponed from January 2022 to 2022–23 television season. | |
| The Morning Show | Apple TV+ | Season 2 filming suspended. | |
| Mr. Mayor | NBC | Casting and pre-production completed, filming postponed to later in 2020. | |
| Mythic Quest: Raven's Banquet | Apple TV+ | Season 2 already completed casting, production suspended. | |
| Next | Fox | Production suspended after crew member diagnosed with the disease; series premiere delayed to Fox's 2020–21 fall lineup. | |
| The Orville | Hulu | Production suspended. Resumed on December 6, 2020. | |
| The Oval | BET | Production suspended. | |
| PEN15 | Hulu | Production suspended. | |
| Pennyworth | Epix | Production suspended. | |
| Pose | FX | Production suspended. | |
| Power Book II: Ghost | Starz | Production suspended, eventually resumed for a September 2020 premiere. | |
| Power Book III: Raising Kanan | Starz | Production suspended. | |
| Powerpuff | The CW | Pilot production suspended, later canceled. | |
| Prank Encounters | Netflix | Production suspended. | |
| Queen of the South | USA | Production suspended. | |
| Queen Sugar | OWN | Production suspended. | |
| The Righteous Gemstones | HBO | Production suspended. | |
| Russian Doll | Netflix | Production suspended. | |
| Rutherford Falls | Peacock | Production suspended. | |
| Saturday Night Live | NBC | Season 45 production suspended for three weeks; resumed with a remotely-produced episode on April 11, 2020. | |
| Saved by the Bell | Peacock | Production resumed in August 2020. | |
| See | Apple TV+ | Production suspended. | |
| Servant | Apple TV+ | Production suspended. | |
| Sesame Street | HBO Max | Season 51 production halted. Resumed on September 28, 2020. | |
| Sex/Life | Netflix | Production suspended. | |
| Shameless | Showtime | Season 11 production suspended. | |
| Sistas | BET | Season 2 production postponed, and completed July 25, 2020; first U.S. scripted primetime series to complete production of a season under safety protocols. | |
| Snowfall | FX | Production suspended. | |
| Snowpiercer | TNT | Production suspended. | |
| Star Trek: Discovery | Paramount+ | Season 4 production suspended. Production resumed November 2020. Production was delayed again in April 2021, due to a COVID-19 infection with one of the crew members. Production resumed again in May 2021. | |
| Stranger Things | Netflix | Season 4 production suspended. | |
| Succession | HBO | Season 3 pre-production suspended. | |
| Superman & Lois | The CW | Casting and pre-production completed, filming postponed and resumed on October 13, 2020. | |
| Supernatural | The CW | Season 15 (its final season) production suspended with two episodes to film, and all seven remaining episodes postponed to The CW's fall lineup. Production resumed on August 18, 2020. | |
| Suspicion | Apple TV+ | Production suspended. | |
| Tokyo Vice | HBO Max | Production suspended. | |
| Tyler Perry's Young Dylan | Nickelodeon | Production suspended. | |
| Untitled The Goonies pilot | Fox | Casting and pre-production completed, filming postponed and later canceled. | |
| Varsity Blues | Quibi | Premiere postponed and later canceled due to Quibi's shutdown. | |
| Walker | The CW | Production postponed; Jared Padalecki was still committed to completing the final season of Supernatural. | |
| The Walking Dead | AMC | Season 11 postponed. Season 10 suspended with 15/16 originally-planned episodes complete, and season finale postponed to late-2020 due to post-production delays. On July 24, 2020, it was announced that season 10 would be extended with six additional episodes scheduled to premiere in early-2021, and the original season finale would premiere on October 4. | |
| WandaVision | Disney+ | Production suspended. Resumed in September 2020. | |
| The Wheel of Time | Prime Video | Production suspended. | |
| The Witcher | Netflix | Production suspended. | |
| Y: The Last Man | FX on Hulu | Production suspended. | |
| You | Netflix | Production suspended. | |
| The Young and the Restless | CBS | Production suspended. Resumed on July 14, First-run episodes resumed August 10. | |

=== Talk shows ===
| Program | Network | Reason | Source |
|---|---|---|---|
| Conan | TBS | Pre-scheduled hiatus began on March 16, 2020; production resumed remotely on March 30, 2020. Commenced on-location filming from the Coronet Theatre in July 2020, with limited crew and no in-studio audience or guests (first U.S. late-night talk show to film out-of-home). Used a studio audience for its final two weeks of episodes, making it the first of the Los Angeles-based late night shows to do so. | |
| The Daily Show with Trevor Noah | Comedy Central | Pre-scheduled hiatus began on March 12, 2020; production resumed remotely on March 30, 2020, billed as The Daily Social Distancing Show. Continued to air new episodes until June 17, 2021, when Noah began an extended summer hiatus. Resumed studio-based episodes on September 13, 2021, but with the show relocated to One Astor Plaza in Times Square with no studio audience, and the preservation of stylistic elements from the remotely-produced episodes. The show delayed a return to having a studio audience due to Omicron variant, and announced in March 2022 that it would return to its normal studio in Hell's Kitchen, Manhattan with a studio audience on April 11, 2022. | |
| Dr. Phil | First-run syndication | Resumed remotely. | |
| The Drew Barrymore Show | First-run syndication | First season produced with a virtual audience, and also employing chroma key studios to allow guests to film their appearances remotely, and be digitally inserted into the show's physical set in Los Angeles. | |
| The Ellen DeGeneres Show | First-run syndication | Season 17 production suspended; resumed remotely on April 6, 2020. Resumed in-studio production for season 18 in September 2020 with a virtual audience. In late-October 2020, the program began to admit 40 in-person audience members for each episode (alongside 30 remote audience members via individual screens placed among the seats). | |
| Full Frontal with Samantha Bee | TBS | Season 5 production suspended; resumed remotely on April 1, 2020. | |
| Home & Family | Hallmark Channel | Production suspended until September 2020. Suspended again from late-December until March 29, 2021, pursuant to recommendations by the Los Angeles County Department of Public Health (LACDPH), when it adopted a new format until the series ended in August 2021. | |
| Jimmy Kimmel Live! | ABC | Production suspended; resumed remotely on March 30, 2020. Returning to film with no audience at the Hollywood Masonic Temple on September 21, 2020, following a summer hiatus with guest hosts. Production returned to a remote format on January 4, 2021, pursuant to recommendations by the LACDPH, before returning on January 25. | |
| The Kelly Clarkson Show | First-run syndication | Production suspended; new pre-recorded episodes from before mid-March 2020 resumed airing on April 6, 2020. New "Messages from Montana" segments filmed from Clarkson's Montana ranch began airing alongside episodes in late-March 2020. The show aired a mix of first-run episodes not yet aired, as well as remote episodes from the ranch and Clarkson's home in Los Angeles. Resumed studio-based episodes with a virtual audience with its season 2 premiere in September 2020. | |
| The Late Late Show with James Corden | CBS | Production suspended; resumed remotely with a March 30 primetime special (HomeFest: James Corden's Late Late Show Special), then in its regular timeslot on April 13, 2020 (with an unscheduled break on April 29 and 30 due to an eye-related medical emergency). Returned to film at Television City with no audience and a reconfigured set beginning August 10, 2020. Production returned to a remote format for part of January 2021, pursuant to recommendations by the LACDPH, before returning on January 25. | |
| The Late Show with Stephen Colbert | CBS | Pre-scheduled hiatus (originally intended for the cancelled NCAA men's basketball tournament) began on March 16, 2020; resumed remotely on March 30, 2020 as A Late Show with Stephen Colbert. Returned to film in an alternate studio at the Ed Sullivan Theater building on August 10, 2020 (modeled upon his personal office), before resuming full production with a studio audience on June 14, 2021. | |
| Last Week Tonight with John Oliver | HBO | Production suspended (program filmed at the CBS Broadcast Center, which was temporarily closed by CBS). One episode filmed from an alternate studio before resuming remotely on March 29, 2020. Returned to studio production in September 2021. | |
| Late Night with Seth Meyers | NBC | Several March episodes cancelled; resumed remotely on March 30, 2020. Returned to film at NBC Studios on September 8, 2020, with no studio audience. Live audiences returned to the show on October 11, 2021. | |
| A Little Late with Lilly Singh | NBC | The entirely of its 97-episode first season had already been filmed over three months in late-2019 (an arrangement designed to accommodate host Lilly Singh's other projects). On May 13, 2020, NBC renewed the series for a second season. Deadline Hollywood reported that the show's staff would wait until they receive approval by NBC and local authorities to perform in-studio filming, as they refused to use a remote format. In December 2020, it was announced that season 2 was scheduled for a January 11, 2021 premiere, with a new filming location (a Los Angeles house), as well as a new showrunner and writing staff. | |
| Live with Kelly and Ryan | First-run syndication | Resumed remotely on March 23, 2020. Returned to WABC-TV's studios in September 2020 to begin season 33, with no studio audience and a wider desk for physical distancing (although with a split-screen effect at their desks designed to simulate a closer position). | |
| Rachael Ray | First-run syndication | Production suspended; resumed remotely on April 6, 2020. | |
| Real Time with Bill Maher | HBO | Production suspended; resumed remotely on April 3, 2020. Returned to studio on August 28, 2020, with no studio audience. Began admitting a small studio audience and in-studio panelists for its September 11, 2020 episode, making it one of the first U.S. talk shows to reintroduce a studio audience. | |
| Tamron Hall | First-run syndication | Production suspended; partially resumed on March 30, 2020. | |
| The Real | First-run syndication | Season 6 production suspended on March 6, 2020; the show had a previously scheduled four week spring break prior to the pandemic with prerecorded episodes filling up that time and resumed remotely on April 13, 2020, as The Real: From Home. | |
| The Talk | CBS | Season 10 production suspended on March 13, 2020; resumed remotely on March 30, 2020, as The Talk: @Home. Returned into an in-studio production without an audience on season 11, with a September 14, 2020 premiere date as scheduled. | |
| The Tonight Show Starring Jimmy Fallon | NBC | Production suspended, resumed remotely on March 23, 2020. Returned to film at NBC Studios on July 13, 2020, from Studio 6-A with no studio audience (first U.S. late-night talk show to return to filming in a studio). Jimmy Fallon returned to Studio 6-B to resume tapings in front of a studio audience on March 22, 2021, and expanded to full capacity beginning on June 9, 2021. | |
| The View | ABC | Initially continued studio-based production with set modifications, but its panelists began to migrate to remote appearances. | |
| Watch What Happens Live with Andy Cohen | Bravo | Production suspended on March 13, 2020, after Andy Cohen had a COVID-19 infection; resumed remotely on March 30, 2020. The show returned to its Manhattan studio starting on October 11, 2020. | |
| The Wendy Williams Show | First-run syndication | Production suspended; new opening segments produced from home began augmenting reruns on April 13, 2020. The show returned to (an albeit empty) studio recording for its twelfth season, which premiered on September 21, 2020. Due to a COVID-19 infection and other health issues being faced by Williams, its thirteenth season premiere was delayed to October 2021, and featured an indefinite rotation of guest hosts until the show ended in June 2022. | |

=== Sports entertainment ===
| Name | Network | Notes | Source |
|---|---|---|---|
| AEW Dynamite | TNT | Touring arena broadcasts ended after March 11. Moved behind closed doors to Daily's Place in Jacksonville, Florida for the next two episodes, before filming content at a Norcross, Georgia gym (owned by AEW performers Q. T. Marshall and Cody Runnels) in early-April. Returned to Daily's Place in May, and began to offer complimentary tickets to sponsors and staff before admitting ticketed spectators in late-August. During the pandemic, AEW usually filmed two weeks of episodes in two days, with a Wednesday live show, followed by the following week's episode being filmed on the Thursday 24 hours later. Shortly after allowing more ticketed spectators in 2021, AEW began filming weekly live shows at Daily's Place. Live touring resumed in July 2021. | |
| WWE Raw | USA | Touring arena broadcasts of WWE's weekly programs ended after March 9, the two programs and WWE pay-per-view events moved to the WWE Performance Center in Orlando with limited personnel and no audience beginning March 13. Beginning August 21, 2020, WWE main roster programs and live events returned to an arena setting ("WWE ThunderDome", initially at Amway Center, production was moved to Tropicana Field in St. Petersburg on December 11, and later Yuengling Center in Tampa after WrestleMania 37 in April 2021), still with no in-person audience but with a virtual audience on LED ribbon displays around the ring, and a larger-scale production than what was possible in the Performance Center studio. Both Raw and SmackDown returned to touring shows as normal in June 2021. | |
| WWE SmackDown | Fox | | |
| WWE NXT | USA | Initially remained at its home studio of Full Sail University in Winter Park, but with no studio audience. In October 2020, NXT re-located to the Performance Center arena, reconfigured as the "Capitol Wrestling Center" with a mix of in-person (primarily friends and family of performers, and limited outside attendance) and virtual audiences (the latter similar in implementation to the aforementioned ThunderDome). By April 2021, WWE had begun to increase the size of the studio audience in the studio, before ending capacity restrictions beginning with the live event NXT TakeOver: In Your House in June. | |

=== Animated ===
| Name | Network | Reason | Source |
|---|---|---|---|
| Archer | FXX | Season 11 premiere postponed to September 16, 2020, due to "production challenges and scheduling issues". | |
| Tooning Out the News | CBS All Access | Production suspended and then resumed remotely, with animators using Slack and Zoom to communicate. | |
| Transformers: War for Cybertron Trilogy | Netflix | Season 1 English voice casting and production had already been completed although the foreign voiceover recordings were delayed. Originally planned for a June 2020 release, premiere date postponed worldwide to July 30, 2020. | |
| Kid Cosmic | Netflix | Despite its original 2020 release, Rob Renzetti posted on Twitter that the series would premiere in 2021, because "COVID slowed [them] down". | |

== Seasons ended prematurely ==
=== Unscripted and talk shows ===
| Name | Network | Notes | Source |
|---|---|---|---|
| E! News | E! | Went on indefinite hiatus in March, cancelled in August 2020 amid cutbacks across all NBCUniversal properties. | |
| In the Room | E! | Went on indefinite hiatus in March, cancelled in August 2020 amid cutbacks across all NBCUniversal properties. | |
| Pop of the Morning | E! | Went on indefinite hiatus in March, cancelled in August 2020 amid cutbacks across all NBCUniversal properties. | |
| Ink Master | Paramount Network | Season 13 concluded without its live finale; prize money split among the finalists. | |
| Lights Out with David Spade | Comedy Central | Suspended after 107 episodes. While suspended, the program was also cancelled by Comedy Central due to low viewership, but the network stated that it was open to selling it to another broadcaster. | |
| The Mel Robbins Show | First-run syndication | Season 1 production ended on March 13 (program filmed at the CBS Broadcast Center, which was temporarily closed by CBS); the series had already been cancelled by its distributor in January 2020, due to low ratings. | |

=== Scripted ===
| Name | Network | Notes | Source |
|---|---|---|---|
| All Rise | CBS | Season 1 ended early with 20/22 originally-planned episodes complete; a pandemic-themed 21st episode was filmed as a season finale using video conferencing. | |
| American Housewife | ABC | Season 4 ended early with 20/21 episodes complete. | |
| A.P. Bio | Peacock | Season 3 ended early with 8/10 episodes complete. | |
| Batwoman | The CW | Season 1 ended early with 20/22 episodes complete. | |
| The Blacklist | NBC | Season 7 ended early with 19/22 episodes complete; the 19th episode was completed as a season finale using voice-acted computer animation to replace unfilmed scenes. | |
| Blue Bloods | CBS | Season 10 ended early with 19/22 episodes complete. | |
| Bob Hearts Abishola | CBS | Season 1 ended early with 20/22 episodes complete. | |
| The Bold Type | Freeform | Season 4 ended early with 16/18 episodes complete. | |
| Bull | CBS | Season 4 ended early with 20/22 episodes complete. | |
| Charmed | The CW | Season 2 ended early with 19/22 episodes complete. | |
| Chicago Fire | NBC | Season 8 ended early with 20/23 episodes complete. | |
| Chicago Med | NBC | Season 5 ended early with 20/23 episodes complete. | |
| Chicago P.D. | NBC | Season 7 ended early with 20/23 episodes complete. | |
| Dynasty | The CW | Season 3 ended early with 20/22 episodes complete. | |
| Empire | Fox | Season 6 (its final season) ended early with 18/20 episodes complete. | |
| FBI | CBS | Season 2 ended early with 19/22 episodes complete. | |
| The Flash | The CW | Season 6 ended early with 19/22 episodes complete. | |
| God Friended Me | CBS | Season 2 ended early with 22 episodes complete, last completed episode reworked into a series finale after the series was additionally cancelled by CBS due to low viewership. | |
| The Goldbergs | ABC | Season 7 ended early with 23/24 episodes complete. | |
| The Good Fight | Paramount+ | Season 4 ended early with 7/10 episodes complete. | |
| Good Girls | NBC | Season 3 ended early with 11/16 episodes complete. | |
| Grey's Anatomy | ABC | Season 16 ended early with 21/25 episodes complete. | |
| Last Man Standing | Fox | Season 8 ended early with 21/22 episodes complete. | |
| Law & Order: SVU | NBC | Season 21 ended early with 20/24 episodes complete. | |
| Legacies | The CW | Season 2 ended early with 16/20 episodes complete. | |
| MacGyver | CBS | Season 4 ended early with 13/20 episodes complete. All of the initially planned seven episodes would be produced in the next season. | |
| Mom | CBS | Season 7 ended early with 20/22 episodes complete. | |
| Mr. Mayor | NBC | Season 1 ended early with 9/13 episodes complete. | |
| Nancy Drew | The CW | Season 1 ended early with 18/22 episodes complete. | |
| NCIS | CBS | Season 17 ended early with 20/24 episodes complete. | |
| NCIS: Los Angeles | CBS | Season 11 ended early with 22/24 episodes complete. | |
| NCIS: New Orleans | CBS | Season 6 ended early with 20/24 episodes complete. | |
| New Amsterdam | NBC | Season 2 ended early with 18/22 episodes complete, with one episode pulled due to sensitivity issues. | |
| One Day at a Time | Pop | Season 4 ended early with 6/13 episodes complete. An animated special, "The Politics Episode", was produced remotely and premiered on June 16. On November 24, it was announced that the series had been cancelled, but the producers were attempting to find a new network for it. On December 8, it was revealed they were unsuccessful, officially cancelling the series. | |
| Prodigal Son | Fox | Season 1 ended early with 20/22 episodes complete. | |
| The Resident | Fox | Season 3 ended early with 20/23 episodes complete. | |
| Riverdale | The CW | Season 4 ended early with 19/22 episodes complete. | |
| Schooled | ABC | Season 2 ended early with 21/22 episodes complete. Series cancelled by ABC in May 2020. | |
| SEAL Team | CBS | Season 3 ended early with 20/22 episodes complete. | |
| Supergirl | The CW | Season 5 ended early with 19/22 episodes complete. | |
| Superstore | NBC | Season 5 ended early with 21/22 episodes complete. | |
| S.W.A.T. | CBS | Season 3 ended early with 21/22 episodes complete. | |
| The Neighborhood | CBS | Season 2 ended early with 22/23 episodes complete. | |
| Young Sheldon | CBS | Season 3 ended early with 21/22 episodes complete. | |

== New thematic programming produced about the pandemic ==
This includes series that are set during the pandemic, or are otherwise designed around remote/at-home production.

| Name | Network | Notes | Source |
|---|---|---|---|
| 90 Day Fiancé: Self-Quarantined | TLC | Spin-off of existing series, documenting the impact of the pandemic on franchise alumni. | |
| Amy Schumer Learns to Cook | Food Network | | |
| The Bachelor: The Greatest Seasons – Ever! | ABC | Spin-off of existing series; anthology featuring footage from previous seasons of The Bachelor and The Bachelorette. Aired in place of The Bachelorette, which was delayed until Fall. | |
| Celebrity Fall Center | E! | Viewer conversations with celebrities. | |
| Celebrity Game Face | E! | Challenges played by celebrities via videoconferencing. | |
| Celebrity Show-Off | TBS | Home-filmed videos submitted by celebrities. | |
| Celebrity Watch Party | Fox | Adaptation of the British series Gogglebox, where celebrities are filmed at home watching and discussing television programming. | |
| Connecting | NBC | Sitcom set during the pandemic, with all characters interacting via video conferences. | |
| Design at Your Door | HGTV | Expert consultations and instruction with network personalities via video conferences, using materials shipped to participants' homes. The series primarily features the families of essential workers. | |
| Friday Night In with The Morgans | AMC | | |
| Find Love Live | TLC | Video conferencing-based dating game show. | |
| The Greatest #AtHome Videos | CBS | | |
| Haircut Night in America | CBS | Expert consultations and tips on hairdressing. | |
| Hot Mess House | HGTV | Expert consultations via video conferences. | |
| iHeart Living Room Concert for America | Fox | Held as a replacement for the 2020 iHeartRadio Music Awards, which was later cancelled. | |
| Love in the Time of Corona | Freeform | Romantic comedy miniseries set during the pandemic. | |
| Married at First Sight: Couples' Cam | Lifetime | Spin-off of existing series. | |
| The Masked Singer: After the Mask | Fox | Aftershow for The Masked Singer. | |
| Restaurant: Impossible: Back in Business | Food Network | Spin-off of existing series; revisits restaurants from previous episodes of the series to assist in their recovery from the impact of the pandemic. | |
| RuPaul's Drag Race: Corona Can't Keep a Good Queen Down | VH1 | Behind-the-scenes special chronicling the production of RuPaul's Drag Race season 13. | |
| Shift Talkers | Motor Trend | | |
| Tournament of Laughs | TBS | Home-filmed videos submitted by celebrities | |

== Series cancelled due to factors related to the pandemic ==
| Name | Network | Notes | Source |
|---|---|---|---|
| GLOW | Netflix | Season 4 (its planned final season) production suspended in mid-March, about three weeks into filming. Cancelled in October 2020, citing budgetary and logistical issues related to the pandemic (especially due to the large cast and physicality of the series, and turnaround time in comparison to the season 3 premiere). | |
| I Am Not Okay with This | Netflix | Cancelled in August 2020 citing budgetary and logistical issues related to the pandemic. | |
| I'm Sorry | TruTV | Production suspended about two weeks into filming. Cancelled in August 2020 citing the pandemic. | |
| Messiah | Netflix | Cancelled on March 26, reportedly due to budgetary and logistical issues related to the pandemic (including the number of different locations that were used for season 1 filming). | |
| On Becoming a God in Central Florida | Showtime | Season 2 production halted in March 2020, series cancelled by Showtime in October 2020, citing scheduling conflicts with its cast and issues related to the pandemic. | |
| Strahan, Sara, and Keke | ABC | Suspended on March 17 in favor of Pandemic: What You Need To Know, a special daytime newscast covering the onset of the pandemic. Although billed by ABC as a limited series, Strahan, Sara, and Keke never returned, and the show was later renamed GMA3: What You Need To Know to expand its scope into a general daytime newscast. Co-host Keke Palmer stated that Strahan, Sara, and Keke had been cancelled, although ABC never made any official statements regarding the program since COVID. | |
| The Society | Netflix | Season 2 production had been postponed. Series cancelled in August 2020 citing budgetary and logistical issues related to the pandemic. | |
| Stumptown | ABC | The series was renewed for a second season and provisionally listed on ABC's fall schedule, but was canceled by the network in mid-September after its production missed a deadline for a fall launch. The series was shopped by ABC Signature to other outlets, but nothing was announced about the series since. | |
| Queen Sono | Netflix | The series was renewed for a second season, but production had postponed. The series was later canceled in November 2020 due to the production challenges caused by the pandemic. | |
