= Your Place or Mine? (game show) =

- Presented by: Cameron Mathison
- Country of origin: United States

Production
- Running time: 48 mins.

Original release
- Network: TLC
- Release: June 8 – July 13, 2008

Your Place or Mine? is an American television game show that ran for six weeks on TLC. It was hosted by Cameron Mathison. The show merges the traditional game show format with makeover reality television series.

Each episode featured two families competing to win several completely furnished rooms (e.g., a bedroom set or a fitness room) for their respective homes. Designated locations in each house needing an overhaul are identified prior to the show and shots of both are shown as the "before" images. Although the furnishings were the same regardless of which family wins a room, the two physical rooms were unlikely to be similar, so a designer presumably came up with a layout which would work for each in advance.

== Gameplay ==
The game is played by correctly answering a toss-up trivia question in order to establish control of a category, after which additional questions in that same category earn points for the controlling family. Families can continue to answer questions as long as they have control, but lose control as well as any earned points if they answer any question incorrectly. Families can also elect to "lock" any points they have by ceding control after any correct answer.

Once a family earns enough points to win the round, they win the corresponding furnished room. In pseudo-real time, co-host Diane Mizota is shown leading a crew of movers into the winner's home to immediately remove the old furnishings and install the new ones. This finishes during a commercial break, after which the "reveal" for the new room is presented.

The major "twist" in the show is that, when a family wins a room, they have the option of either taking that room, or stealing a room which has previously been won by the other family. If they opt to steal, movers must restore the original room configuration of the victims of the theft, and then move the furnishings into the other house.

At the very end of the show, the family with the most total points plays a bonus trivia round. One member of the family sits in a chair facing away from the rest of the family, and nominates one of the other members to answer a question based on a category given by the host. Up to 5 questions are available, and if the family can answer 3 questions correctly before missing 3, they win a new car.
