= The Drew Barrymore Show =

American television variety talk show

- Also known as: Drew
- Genre: Variety talk show
- Created by: Drew Barrymore
- Directed by: Scot Titelbaum
- Presented by: Drew Barrymore; Ross Mathews (co-anchor Drew's News); Valerie Bertinelli (co-anchor Drew's News)
- Country of origin: United States
- Original language: English
- No. of seasons: 6
- No. of episodes: 898

Production
- Executive producers: Drew Barrymore; Jason Kurtz
- Production locations: CBS Broadcast Center, Hell's Kitchen, Midtown Manhattan, New York City
- Camera setup: Multi-camera
- Running time: 44 minutes (excluding commercials, 2020–2022); 22 minutes (excluding commercials, 2022–present)
- Production companies: Big Ticket Pictures; Flower Films; CBS Media Ventures

Original release
- Network: Syndication
- Release: September 14, 2020 – present

The Drew Barrymore Show (stylized as the DREW barrymore show and often shortened to simply Drew) is an Emmy-winning first-run syndicated American talk show hosted by actress Drew Barrymore. The show is distributed by CBS Media Ventures and debuted on September 14, 2020. As of October 2025, it was the second most-viewed syndicated talk show in the United States.

== Concept ==
The program features a diverse array of human-interest stories, celebrity guests, lifestyle segments, and field pieces.

== Production ==
Barrymore shot a pilot for the show in New York City in August 2019, aiming for a fall 2020 launch. Barrymore had previously circled a talk show deal with Warner Bros.' Telepictures in 2016, but a pilot never came to fruition, in part because of a lukewarm response from prospective station groups at the time.

Barrymore debuted several digital series in the lead-up to her broadcast debut that included "The Making of the Drew Barrymore Show" and conversations with talk-show hosts who have inspired her in "The Art of the Interview." This particular series included Barrymore's conversations with Gayle King, Andy Cohen, Jimmy Fallon, Whoopi Goldberg, and Sean Evans.

Barrymore also launched "Drew's Movie Nite", in which she would invite fans to join her in a live Twitter watch party. The series kicked off on July 30, 2020, with the Nickelodeon broadcast of the 1997 film Good Burger. Also featured in the interview were the stars of Good Burger, Kel Mitchell and Kenan Thompson.

The next edition of "Drew's Movie Nite" was the Nickelodeon broadcast of The SpongeBob Movie: Sponge Out of Water from 2015 on September 3, 2020. This time, Barrymore interviewed the voice of SpongeBob SquarePants, Tom Kenny and the voice of Patrick Star, Bill Fagerbakke. The third edition of "Drew's Movie Nite", this time aired on CBS on October 25, 2020, and was the 1996 film Scream starring Barrymore. "Drew's Movie Nite" returned on September 5, 2021, with the CBS broadcast of School of Rock.

The show was launched in fall 2020 during the COVID-19 pandemic in the United States. The launch took place with a small crew at the CBS Broadcast Center in Midtown Manhattan, with pandemic-related rules and precautions. Instead of an in-person audience, members of a virtual crowd would be beamed in via a platform called Audience From Anywhere and projected on a large display behind Barrymore. Meanwhile, guests who live on the West Coast have the option to appear via green-screen and sit across from the host.

Barrymore also fought hard to have the show be produced live at 9 a.m. U.S. Eastern Time. According to Barrymore, she thought it would be appropriate to be doing this where she could speak to the moment rather than risk being a day or two old. Barrymore added that the type of energy when the show came out could be totally unattached. Barrymore also argued against doing a home-based show amid the pandemic.

In December 2020, the show appointed Eitan Bernath as the Principal Culinary Contributor.

The show was renewed again for a second season on March 17, 2021. The show also announced that come its second season, it would be produced with a full-capacity audience in attendance at the CBS Broadcast Center in New York.

CBS Media Ventures announced on April 1, 2022, that the series had been renewed yet again, this time for a third season. Beginning with the 2022–23 season, the show was reformatted into two half-hour segments that could air either contiguously or separately. With the new format, select CBS-owned stations air the first segment of Drew as a lead-out to new half-hour local 9:00 a.m. newscasts, with the second half of Drew airing later in the day and/or on their duopoly stations. On January 17, 2023, the show was renewed for a fourth season.

On September 11, 2023, the show resumed episodes without writers and was picketed by the guild members, who saw this as Barrymore being a strikebreaker during the 2023 Writers Guild of America strike. Two audience members were turned away for wearing WGA pins. On September 17, it was announced that the show's hiatus would resume amid the backlash. The fourth season eventually premiered on October 16, 2023. On January 11, 2024, the show was renewed for a fifth season. On August 22, 2024, the show was renewed for a sixth season, ahead of the fifth-season premiere on September 9, 2024. The sixth season premiered on September 8, 2025. On March 9, 2026, the show was renewed for a seventh and eighth season, now running until 2028.

== Episodes ==
Season	Episodes	Originally released	
Season	Episodes	First released	Last released
1	172	September 14, 2020	May 28, 2021
2	130	September 13, 2021	April 22, 2022
3	158	September 12, 2022	May 11, 2023
4	152	October 16, 2023	June 21, 2024
5	165	September 9, 2024	September 5, 2025
6	TBA	September 8, 2025	TBA

The debut episode featured guest appearances by Barrymore's former co-stars Cameron Diaz, Lucy Liu, and Adam Sandler.

The September 25, 2020, episode featured Barrymore reuniting with her ex-husband Tom Green after having not spoken to each other in over 15 years. The two reminisced on their time together and years apart, which made Barrymore cry after she realized how much time had passed.

The October 12, 2020, episode featured Barrymore interviewing Chloe Fineman following Fineman's impersonation of Barrymore on the October 3, 2020, edition of Saturday Night Live. Barrymore said to the second-year SNL player "I'm really nervous to meet you, I'm so excited, I'm such a fan," for which Fineman responded by saying "I'm your biggest fan, you're gonna make me cry!" Fineman added: "I mean doing you was so exciting because you were on the cover of InStyle and the impression that I did this summer started because I really wanted that shirt. It was so cute."

== Broadcast ==
The CBS Television Stations group was on board to anchor the launch of The Drew Barrymore Show, including on KCBS-TV in Los Angeles and WCBS-TV in New York City. Overall, the show had been cleared to launch on stations representing 85% of U.S. TV households.

In Canada, Global announced on August 18, 2020, that they would pick up The Drew Barrymore Show, before September 14. In Australia, the show aired on pay TV channel Fox Arena before episodes became available on Paramount-affiliated 10Play It is also aired on The 10 main channel at 11am weekdays from June 3, 2024, replacing Dr. Phil.

In New Zealand, it is streamable and watchable on TVNZ 2. In Ireland, the show airs on RTÉ One. In Germany, it airs on Sat 1 Emotions. Elsewhere internationally, it can be streamed on Paramount+.

== Reception ==
=== Critical response ===
The premiere episode on September 14, 2020, was "a real emotional roller coaster" according to Jezebel's Rich Juzwiak. He added "The enthusiasm was massive, the veracity was questionable, the performance was distracting. She shifted gears in the next paragraph of her monologue to reintroduce herself, remind us that she is exactly who we think she is, and suggests that she's so much more. With the impassioned face of a celebrity raising funds on a telethon, Barrymore said emphatically that, 'I'm also someone who is learning all the time, and I'm so excited to figure out this thing called life with you!' Wait, that's what we're doing here?" Juzwiak also said that Barrymore has been a nonstop ball of energy, which can be exhausting and endearing.

In a review of the first season, Variety's Daniel D'Addario said that Barrymore was hampered in her first week by her reliance on celebrity friends, saying "Barrymore's show is squarely in her comfort zone, ... but—speaking as a Barrymore fan who was excited to see her in conversation—there is as yet untapped potential for her to dig deeper, to show us more of what she really believes or finds important."

In another first season review, William Hughes of The A.V. Club said that there have been two major takeaways from The Drew Barrymore Show after one week: "Drew Barrymore definitely has a lot of cool, famous friends, and Drew Barrymore sometimes acts in ways that are tremendously weird when asked to talk into a camera by herself. The combination has formed some of the most hypnotically, authentically strange TV the internet has had a chance to dine out on in a while, as Barrymore jumps between recreating famous movies she's made with her buddies, to monologuing, for minutes at a time, about her love of removing stains from T-shirts."

Tracy Moore of Vanity Fair said that it is remarkable that "something so offbeat is happening on daytime at all" of the "low-key insanity" of The Drew Barrymore Show. Moore also said of Barrymore "She cooks; she interior designs; she feels. She talks in hashtags, and casually drops quotes from Gayle King, Patti Smith, and e.e. cummings. She is, it seems, genuinely in awe of everyone and everything, a self-described 'human scrapbook of news,' a 'pop culture junkie,' a lover of people and stain removal."

Jessica Toomer of Uproxx proclaimed that 2020 was the year Drew Barrymore blew up the daytime talk show machine. Toomer added that "Drew Barrymore's show is all of those things. The kind of mind-numbing social experiment that rivals the frenzied delirium of a Safdie Brothers crime saga but interjects just enough PBS-after-school-special cheer to quiet the shrieking happening inside your brain as you watch. It's not pretty all the time. Sometimes, it's not even coherent. But like a 1994-era Chloë Sevigny, it's the kind of "It Girl" of the talk show universe that you just can't quite define, but know you should worship anyway."

In September 2022, The New Yorker profiled the show and its host ahead of its third-season premiere, expressing bewilderment that the show had been renewed given its ratings and commenting:

"The Drew Barrymore Show" is too chaotic and destabilizing to feel manufactured. The show's open sentimentality—and copious shed tears—are offset by its crackle of unplanned clumsiness. Bouncing off the walls one moment and breaking down the next, Barrymore seems to be barely holding on as sentiment threatens to overtake her. She is not so much revisiting her past as dragging it along like a bindle full of lessons waiting to be discovered. If her off-the-cuff irrepressibility is an act, then it's the best performance of her life.

Critical consensus was more positive after the 2022 format change, with one reviewer calling the show a "viral sensation," elaborating that "even if you are not interested in celebrities, there is a radical naivety to Barrymore ... that is joyful, unreflective and fun to watch. If you are interested in celebrities, these will be the most interesting interviews you've ever watched, with deeply personal confidences, from stars in their prime."

=== Ratings ===
The Drew Barrymore Show did not sustain high ratings its first season. In its first season's second week, ratings for the program were down 14%, at 600,000 viewers. Hot Bench, the show that The Drew Barrymore Show replaced in many markets, was steady at 1.7 million. According to an October 15, 2020, report from OK! magazine, the show had already dropped 38% in ratings since it premiered. According to The Hollywood Reporter, the ratings grew by 19 percent in households and 13 percent among women 25–54 in Nielsen's metered markets between November 2020 and February 2021.

For the second, 2021–22 season, the program drew an average of 740,000 viewers.

In the third season, ratings improved significantly, averaging 1.21 million viewers—up nearly half a million viewers year to year. The third season of the program ranked as syndication's #4 talk show.

Ratings subsequently improved, and as of its sixth season, it is syndication's #2 talk show.

=== Accolades ===
Awards and nominations for The Drew Barrymore Show
Year	Award	Category	Nominee(s)	Result
2021	Daytime Emmy Awards	Outstanding Entertainment Talk Show Host	Drew Barrymore	Nominated
2021	Daytime Emmy Awards	Outstanding Talk Show Entertainment	The Drew Barrymore Show	Nominated
2021	Daytime Emmy Awards	Outstanding Daytime Promotional Announcement	The Drew Barrymore Show	Nominated
2022
2022	Webby Awards	Special Achievement	Drew Barrymore	Won
2022	MTV Movie & TV Awards	Best Talk/Topical Show	The Drew Barrymore Show	Nominated
2022	Daytime Emmy Awards	Outstanding Entertainment Talk Show Host	Drew Barrymore	Nominated
2022	Daytime Emmy Awards	Outstanding Talk Show Entertainment	The Drew Barrymore Show	Nominated
2022	Daytime Emmy Awards	Outstanding Daytime Promotional Announcement	The Drew Barrymore Show	Nominated
2022	Daytime Emmy Awards	Outstanding Writing Team For A Daytime Non-Fiction Program	Chelsea White, Cristina Kinon, Liz Koe	Nominated
2022	Daytime Emmy Awards	Outstanding Costume Design/Styling	Lee Harris, Matthew Kilgore	Won
2022	Daytime Emmy Awards	Outstanding Special Effects Costumes, Makeup and Hairstyling	Lee Harris, Matthew Kilgore, Daniel Howell, Toni Coburn, Robin Fredriksz, Lauren Gulino, Louis Zakarian	Won
2022	People's Choice Awards	Daytime Talk Show of 2022	The Drew Barrymore Show	Nominated
2023
2023	MTV Movie & TV Awards	Best Host	Drew Barrymore	Won
2023	Daytime Emmy Awards	Outstanding Daytime Talk Series Host	Drew Barrymore	Nominated
2023	Daytime Emmy Awards	Outstanding Talk Series	The Drew Barrymore Show	Nominated
2023	Daytime Emmy Awards	Outstanding Writing Team for a Daytime Non-Fiction Program	Cristina Kinon, Chelsea White, Liz Koe	Nominated
2023	Daytime Emmy Awards	Outstanding Directing Team for a Multi-Camera Non-Fiction Program	Adam Heydt, Scot Titelbaum, Sara Tannor, Veda Carey, Liz Keane, Kyle Ramdeen	Nominated
2023	Daytime Emmy Awards	Outstanding Lighting Direction	Bob Barnhart, Dave Grill, Shawn Kaufman	Nominated
2023	Daytime Emmy Awards	Outstanding Daytime Promotional Announcement	Donna Baker, Melinda Abbot, Shannon Mattaro, Ric Serena, Karl Jacobsen, Dena McFadyen (for "Drew's Got the Beat")	Won
2023	Daytime Emmy Awards	Outstanding Main Title and Graphic Design	Alyssa Medina, Megan Mucci	Nominated
2024	People's Choice Awards	The Daytime Talk Show	The Drew Barrymore Show	Nominated
2024	Daytime Emmy Awards	Outstanding Directing Team for a Multi-Camera Non-Fiction Program	Adam Heydt, Scot Titelbaum, Sara Tannor, Veda Carey, Liz Keane, Kyle Ramdeen	Nominated
2024	Daytime Emmy Awards	Outstanding Costume Design/Styling	Lee Harris, Matthew Kilgore	Nominated
2024	Daytime Emmy Awards	Outstanding Hairstyling and Makeup	Lee Harris, Matthew Kilgore, Daniel Howell, Toni Coburn, Robin Fredriksz, Lauren Gulino, Louis Zakarian	Nominated
2024	Daytime Emmy Awards	Outstanding Art Direction/Set Decorating/Scenic Design	The Drew Barrymore Show	Nominated
2025	Daytime Emmy Awards	Outstanding Daytime Talk Series	The Drew Barrymore Show	Nominated
2025	Daytime Emmy Awards	Outstanding Daytime Talk Series Host	Drew Barrymore	Won
