= Eitan Bernath =

American internet celebrity and businessperson

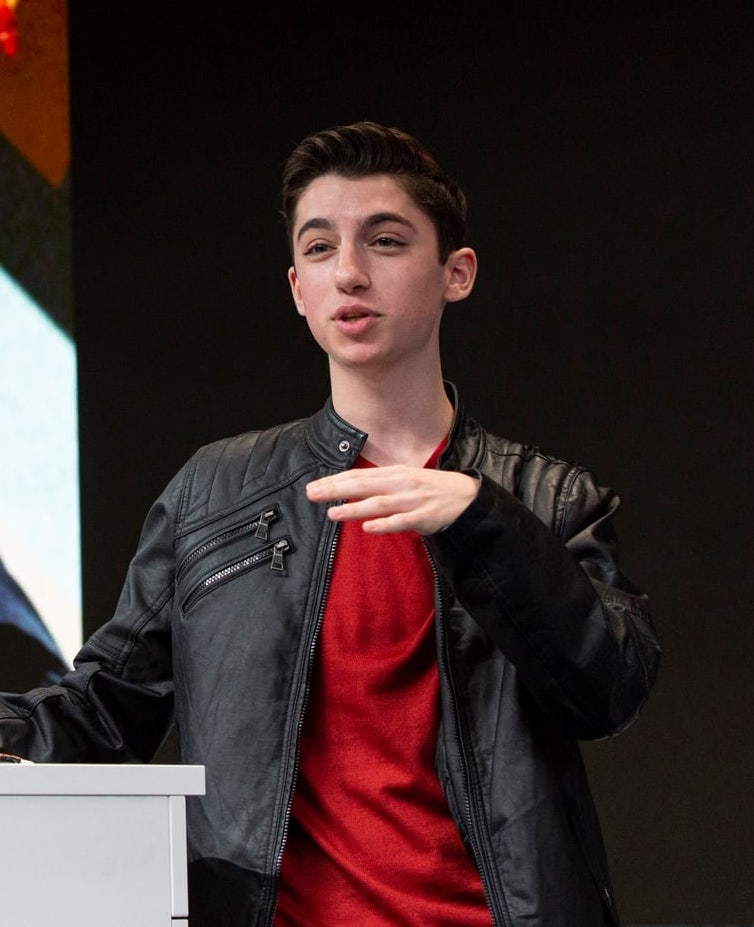
- Bernath in 2019
- Born: Eitan Bernath; April 25, 2002 (age 24); Teaneck, New Jersey, U.S.
- Education: Yavneh Academy; The Frisch School; Columbia University
- Years active: 2014–present
- Agent: William Morris Endeavor; UNCMMN; ID; The Harry Walker Agency; Brecheen, Feldman, Breimer, Silver & Thompson, LLP
- Awards: Forbes 30 Under 30; Forbes Next 1000; 36 Under 36, The Jewish Week

YouTube information
- Channel: Eitan Bernath
- Genre: Air Fry Cooking
- Subscribers: 363 thousand
- Views: 133 million
- Last updated: 4 August 2026
- Website: eitanbernath.com eitanproductions.com

Signature
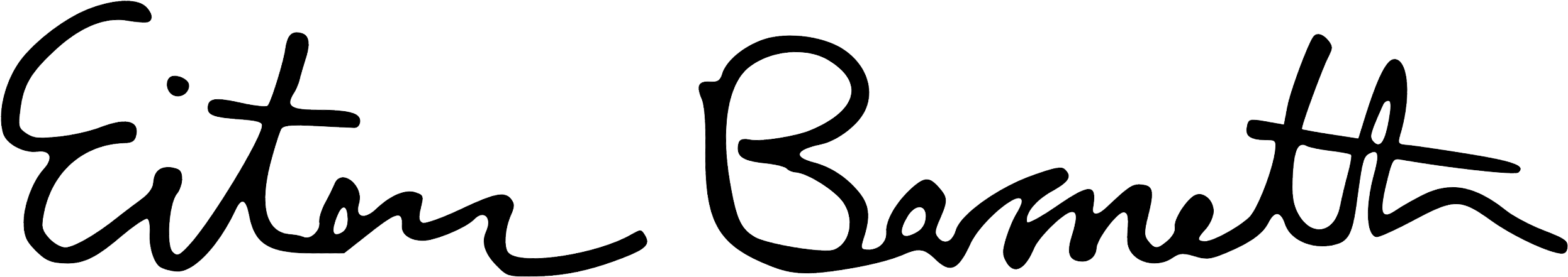

Eitan Bernath (born April 25, 2002) is an American celebrity chef, entertainer, author, social media influencer, and entrepreneur.

In December 2020, he became Principal Culinary Contributor for The Drew Barrymore Show; according to Variety, he is the first TikTok star to expand into a recurring role on daytime television. He is a contributor to newspapers and magazines, and appears on other television shows including Good Morning America, Today, and Live with Kelly and Ryan.

Bernath was appointed a High Level Supporter to the United Nations World Food Programme in February 2023.

He has been called a "culinary darling" by The New York Times and "the internet's most delightful chef" by O, The Oprah Magazine.

== Early life ==
Bernath was born in Teaneck, New Jersey to Sabrina Bernath, a high school math teacher, and Jason Bernath, an occupational therapist. He has a brother named Yoni.

Bernath developed a passion for food and cooking at a young age.

== Career ==
Bernath began his television career competing on Chopped at the age of 12. Three years later he was a contestant on Guy's Grocery Games, another Food Network show.

=== TikTok and Instagram ===
In 2019, Bernath grew a significant following on TikTok. He became known on the platform for his cooking tutorials and is now regarded as one of the platforms most notable food accounts. In an interview with Taylor Lorenz for The New York Times, Bernath explained "TikTok is the biggest thing that happened to me in my career, and honestly is the reason why I am where I am today."

His following grew on Instagram in 2020 where he was an early adopter of Instagram Reels.

Bernath performed on TikTok's "#HappyAtHome: Live!" shows in March 2020 alongside Charli D'Amelio, Addison Rae, Tyra Banks, Alicia Keys, and DJ Khaled. He was a featured TikTok creator at VidCon US 2021 in Anaheim, California.

=== Snapchat ===
Bernath hosts three syndicated shows on Snapchat: Eitan Bernath, Eitan's Test Kitchen, and Eitan's Food Lab. According to Tubefilter, the shows accrued 29.2 million unique viewers and 201 million minutes of watch time in 2021.

=== Brand partners ===
Bernath's brand partners include Warner Brothers, SharkNinja, Cup Noodles, Red Star Yeast, Dreams Resorts & Spas, Chefman, and the government of Thailand.

=== Performance ===
He joined with Rachael Ray on a celebrity cooking camp in July 2020.

Bernath appeared at the Outside Lands festival in San Francisco in October 2021 with Marc E. Bassy.

=== Television ===
In December 2020, Bernath was appointed the Principal Culinary Contributor for The Drew Barrymore Show on CBS. The New York Post reported that Barrymore discovered Bernath from her daughters who watch his TikTok videos. He has cooked on segments with Jason Derulo, Gordon Ramsay, and Molly Sims. Barrymore and Bernath often try unconventional food combinations, which Barrymore has said is "one of my favorite things to do on the show."

Bernath also appears on talk shows including Good Morning America, Live with Kelly and Ryan, The Good Dish, The Marilyn Dennis Show and A Little Late with Lilly Singh.

=== Articles ===
Bernath writes for food publications including Food & Wine, Saveur, Delish, The Kitchn, Food52, and The Nosher. He has also contributed to The Washington Post, Houston Chronicle, The Forward, The Jewish Standard, and Kosher.com.

Bernath has been profiled by publications The New York Times, The Hollywood Reporter, Variety, Teen Vogue, The New York Post, Business Insider, People Magazine, Quartz, Delish Magazine, Rolling Stone, and Vanity Fair amongst others.

== Personal life ==
Bernath is Jewish, identifies as a Zionist and lives in Manhattan. He considers himself a feminist.

Bernath grew up in a Orthodox household and said in 2018 that he kept kosher, while describing his work as that of “a food blogger who happens to be kosher” rather than a specialist kosher-food blogger.

He has been a guest of The White House under the Biden administration at events including the White House Hanukkah Party and holiday decoration unveilings.

Eitan dropped pursuing his Bachelor of Arts degree at Columbia University School of General Studies in 2022, quoting that instead he has decided to taken up the Wine & Spirit Education Trust Level 3 Award in Wines.

Bernath is reported to be a close friend of Drew Barrymore.

== Charity work ==
Bernath has worked with Douglas Emhoff and Anthony Fauci on social media initiatives.

=== City Harvest ===
Bernath has been a member of the City Harvest Food Council since November 2021. He is the youngest member on the council and co-chairs the host committee of the organization's fundraising events. In November 2022, Bernath was a juror for the Canstruction competition at Brookfield Place benefiting the organization.

=== Animal Haven ===
He serves as an ambassador for Animal Haven, a New York city animal rescue organization.

=== India ===
Bernath visited Patna during December 2022, in partnership with Indian government agencies, to support poverty alleviation initiatives in Bihar. A video of Bernath and Bill Gates preparing Roti went viral internationally on social media, with Narendra Modi sharing the video on his personal Instagram account.

== Accolades ==
In December 2021, Bernath was named in the Forbes 30 Under 30 list within the Food & Drink category, the youngest individual yet admitted in the sector. He was also in its September 2021 Next 1000 list.

He was included in the Algemeiner's J100 selection in December 2022 and New York Jewish Week's 36 Under 36 in June 2018.

== Books ==
Bernath, Eitan (2022). Eitan Eats the World: New Comfort Classics to Cook Right Now. Clarkson Potter. ISBN 978-0-593-23536-2.

== Filmography ==
List of television appearances
Year	Title	Role	Notes
2014	Chopped	Contestant	September 30, 2014
2017	Guy's Grocery Games	Contestant	September 24, 2017
2021	A Little Late with Lilly Singh	Guest	March 19, 2021
2022	The Marilyn Denis Show	Guest	March 31, 2022
2022	Good Morning America	Guest	April 29, 2022
2022	The Good Dish	Guest	May 2, 2022
2022	Good Morning Washington	Guest	May 2, 2022
2022	KTLA Morning News	Guest	May 20, 2022
2022	Live with Kelly and Ryan	Guest	June 3, 2022
2022	Now 14	Guest	June 23, 2022
2022	Cheddar News	Guest	September 1, 2022
2022	New York Living	Guest	September 20, 2022
2022	CBS New York	Guest	September 23, 2022
2020—	The Drew Barrymore Show	Self	Principal Culinary Contributor
