= Oz (surname) =

Oz is a surname. Notable people with the surname include:

- Amos Oz (1939–2018), Israeli author
- Avraham Oz (born 1944), Israeli theatre professor
- Daphne Oz (born 1986), American author, chef, and television host; daughter of Mehmet Oz (Öz)
- Frank Oz (Oznowicz; born 1944), American film director, actor, and puppeteer
- Kobi Oz (born 1969), Israeli singer with the Teapacks
- Lisa Oz (born 1963), American author, television personality, and radio personality; wife of Mehmet Oz (Öz)
- Mehmet Oz, Turkish: Öz (born 1960), known as Dr. Oz, Turkish-American surgeon, television host, and politician

== See also ==
- Avraham Katz-Oz (born 1934), Israeli politician
- Fania Oz-Salzberger (born 1960), Israeli historian and professor
- Öz (surname)
