= Öz =

Öz is a Turkish surname. Notable people with the surname include:

- Daphne Öz (born 1986), American author, chef, and television host
- Doğan Öz (1934–1978), Turkish prosecutor assassinated during his investigation of the Turkish deep state
- Emanuel Öz (born 1979), Swedish politician
- Lisa Öz (born 1963), American author, television personality, and radio personality
- Mehmet Öz (born 1960), known as Dr. Oz, Turkish-American surgeon, television host, and politician
- Noyan Öz (born 1991), Turkish-German footballer

== See also ==
- Oz (surname)
