= MasterChef Junior (American TV series) season 9 =

Season of television series

MasterChef Junior
- Season 9
- Promotional poster for season 9, featuring (L to R) judges Tilly Ramsay, Gordon Ramsay, Aarón Sanchez and Daphne Oz
- Judges: Gordon Ramsay; Aarón Sanchez; Daphne Oz; Tilly Ramsay
- No. of contestants: 12
- Winner: Bryson McGlynn
- Runners-up: Michael Seegobin; Remy Powell
- No. of episodes: 10

Release
- Original network: Fox
- Original release: March 4 – May 20, 2024

Season chronology
- ← Previous; Season 8

The ninth season of the American competitive reality television series MasterChef Junior premiered on Fox on March 4, 2024. Gordon Ramsay, Aarón Sanchez, and Daphne Oz all returned as judges, while Tilly Ramsay joined as a new judge. The season was won by Bryson McGlynn, an 11-year-old from Opelika, Alabama, with Michael Seegobin from New Smyrna Beach, Florida and Remy Powell from Hollywood, Florida being the runners-up.

== Production ==
On December 20, 2022, the initial casting announcement for a potential ninth season was posted. The casting notice was re-posted on September 8, 2023 on the show's Twitter page. On October 12, 2023, it was announced that the series had been renewed for a ninth season, with Ramsay, Sánchez, and Oz as returning judges, along with new judge Tilly Ramsay. On December 13, 2023, it was announced that the season would premiere on March 4, 2024. On February 21, 2024, the 12 new contestants were announced. This number of contestants marks the fewest competitors in a regular season since the first season.

== Top 12 ==
Sources for age, first name and hometown:

Contestant	Age	Hometown	Status
Bryson McGlynn	11	Opelika, Alabama	Winner May 20
Michael Seegobin	11	New Smyrna, Florida	Runners-Up May 20
Remy Powell	10	Hollywood, Florida	Runners-Up May 20
Asher Niles	8	Yakima, Washington	Eliminated May 6
Jordyn Joyner	8	Greensboro, North Carolina	Eliminated April 29
Alfred Eggermont	11	Binford, North Dakota	Eliminated April 22
Lilo Tsai	9	Ann Arbor, Michigan	Eliminated April 15
Miles Platt	10	College Station, Texas	Eliminated March 25
Kristell Jean	10	Austin, Texas	Eliminated March 18
Lydia Ledon	9	Atlanta, Georgia	Eliminated March 18
Jason Sun	9	San Gabriel, California	Eliminated March 11
Breanna "Bre" Williams	10	Burbank, California	Eliminated March 4

== Elimination table ==
Place	Contestant	Episode									
Place	Contestant	1	2	3	4	5	6		7	8	10
1	Bryson	WIN	IN	LOW	WIN	HIGH	IN	IN	IN	IN	WINNER
2	Michael	HIGH	IN	WIN	WIN	WIN	WIN	IMM	WIN	IN	RUNNERS-UP
2	Remy	HIGH	IN	WIN	LOW	HIGH	IN	LOW	IN	IN	RUNNERS-UP
4	Asher	IN	WIN	WIN	LOW	HIGH	IN	IN	LOW	ELIM	
5	Jordyn	IN	HIGH	LOW	WIN	LOW	WIN	IMM	ELIM		
6	Alfred	IN	HIGH	LOW	LOW	LOW	IN	ELIM			
7	Lilo	LOW	LOW	WIN	WIN	ELIM					
8	Miles	LOW	IN	WIN	ELIM						
9	Kristell	IN	LOW	ELIM							
9	Lydia	IN	IN	ELIM							
11	Jason	IN	ELIM								
12	Bre	ELIM									

(WINNER) This cook won the competition.
(RUNNER-UP) This cook finished in second place.
(WIN) The cook won an individual challenge (Mystery Box Challenge, Elimination Test, Pressure Test, or Skills Challenge).
(WIN) The cook was on the winning team in the Team Challenge and directly advanced to the next round.
(HIGH) The cook was one of the top entries in the individual challenge but didn't win.
(IN) The cook was not selected as a top or bottom entry in an individual challenge.
(IN) The cook was not selected as a top or bottom entry in a Team Challenge.
(IMM) The cook did not have to compete in that round of the competition and was safe from elimination.
(LOW) The cook was one of the bottom entries in an individual challenge or Pressure Test, and advanced.
(LOW) The cook was one of the bottom entries in a Team Challenge, and they advanced.
(ELIM) The cook was eliminated.

== Episodes ==
No. overall	No. in season	Title	Original release date	Prod. code	U.S. viewers (millions)
96	1	"Eating Emoji"	March 4, 2024	JRM-901	1.61
The 12 new contestants are welcomed to the MasterChef kitchen to meet the judges, including new judge Tilly Ramsay. This season's winner will receive a $100,000 cash prize and the MasterChef Junior trophy.: Elimination Challenge: The contestants are given cookies decorated with emojis and must make a dish that expresses the emotion behind the assigned emoji. They receive their aprons, which are shot out of a giant emoji air cannon, and are given one hour to cook their dishes. The top three dishes belong to Remy, Michael, and Bryson, and Bryson wins the challenge, winning an all-expenses paid trip to Las Vegas, including a stay at the Harrah's Las Vegas resort and dinner at Ramsay's Kitchen. All three receive immunity from elimination. The bottom three dishes belong to Lilo, Miles, and Bre. Bre is eliminated.; Challenge Winner/Immune: Bryson McGlynn, Michael Seegobin and Remy Powell; Bottom three: Bre Williams, Lilo Tsai and Miles Platt; Eliminated: Bre Williams
97	2	"Under the Sea"	March 11, 2024	JRM-902	1.52
Mystery Box Challenge: The contestants are tasked with making a dish using both the mystery seafood in their boxes and seaweed. They are given one hour to cook their dishes. Alfred, Jordyn, and Asher are the top three, and Asher wins the challenge, winning an all-expenses paid trip to San Luis Obispo, California. All three of them are safe from elimination. Kristell, Jason, and Lilo are the bottom three. Jason is eliminated.; Challenge Winner/Immune: Alfred Eggermont, Asher Niles and Jordyn Joyner; Bottom three: Jason Sun, Kristell Jean and Lilo Tsai; Eliminated: Jason Sun
98	3	"Globetrotters"	March 18, 2024	JRM-903	1.51
Team Challenge: The contestants are visited by members of the Harlem Globetrotters and are split into teams of five. The Blue Team consists of Asher, Lilo, Remy, Michael and captain Miles, while the Red Team consists of Alfred, Kristell, Bryson, Jordyn and captain Lydia. The teams are given one hour to prepare nine portions of a healthy meal, featuring a protein, two sides, a starch and sauce, as well as a vegan dish. The Blue Team wins the challenge. The judges announce there will be a double elimination, and Kristell and Lydia are both eliminated.; Challenge Winners/Immune: Asher Niles, Lilo Tsai, Michael Seegobin, Miles Platt and Remy Powell; Eliminated: Kristell Jean and Lydia Ledon
99	4	"Magic Castle"	March 25, 2024	JRM-904	1.44
Team Challenge: For their next team challenge, the contestants are taken to the Magic Castle, where they are split into teams of 4. The Blue Team consists of Bryson, Lilo, Jordyn and captain Michael, while the Red Team consists of Miles, Alfred, Asher and captain Remy. They have one hour to cook a fine-dining dish for all of the magicians and staff of the Academy of Magical Arts, as well as executive chef Ben LaFleche. They must also present a sample plate to the judges in 30 minutes. The Blue Team wins the challenge. Miles is eliminated.; Challenge Winners/Immune: Bryson McGlynn, Jordyn Joyner, Lilo Tsai and Michael Seegobin; Eliminated: Miles Platt
100	5	"Mystery Box"	April 15, 2024	JRM-905	1.46
Mystery Box Challenge: The contestants are given one hour to make a dish using their least-favorite ingredients. Asher, Remy, Michael and Bryson are the top four, and Michael wins the challenge, winning a set of e-bikes for his family. All four of them receive immunity from elimination. Lilo, Alfred and Jordyn are the bottom three. Lilo is eliminated.; Challenge Winner/Immune: Asher Niles, Bryson McGlynn, Michael Seegobin and Remy Powell; Bottom three: Alfred Eggermont, Lilo Tsai and Jordyn Joyner; Eliminated: Lilo Tsai
101	6	"Pancakes & Ice Cream"	April 22, 2024	JRM-906	1.51
Team Challenge: The contestants are randomly split into teams of two: the Blue Team (Alfred and Remy); Yellow Team (Asher and Bryson), and Red Team (Michael and Jordyn). They are given 15 minutes to cook as many perfect pancake stacks as they can, after receiving a demonstration from Daphne. The Red Team makes 10 acceptable stacks, winning the challenge and a pair of ice cream sundaes.; Challenge Winners/Immune: Jordyn Joyner and Michael Seegobin; Elimination Challenge: The remaining contestants are given 75 minutes to prepare an ice cream dessert of their choice. The judges save Bryson and Asher, leaving Alfred and Remy as the bottom two. Alfred is eliminated.; Bottom two: Alfred Eggermont and Remy Powell; Eliminated: Alfred Eggermont
102	7	"Thyme Travel"	April 29, 2024	JRM-907	1.46
Elimination Challenge: The contestants have 60 minutes to create an elevated version of their first dish. Michael wins the challenge, winning an all-inclusive trip to Mexico, including a stay at the Paradisus Playa del Carmen resort in the Riviera Maya. The judges determine that Bryson and Remy have done well enough to advance to the semifinal, leaving Asher and Jordyn as the bottom two. Jordyn is eliminated.; Challenge Winner/Immune: Michael Seegobin; Bottom two: Asher Niles and Jordyn Joyner; Eliminated: Jordyn Joyner
103	8	"Gordon Demo"	May 6, 2024	JRM-908	1.42
Elimination Challenge: The semifinalists must keep up with Gordon in recreating his signature dish of duck à l'orange, after receiving a demonstration in breaking down a duck, and have 60 seconds to plate their dish after he finishes. Asher's dish is deemed the weakest and he is eliminated.; Eliminated: Asher Niles
104	9	"Finale Part 1"	May 13, 2024	JRM-909	1.43
Season Finale: The judges announce that the winner will receive a kitchen from Viking, and a set of kitchen tools and bakeware from OXO. The three finalists must prepare their best appetizer, entrée and dessert. They will have 60 minutes to prepare each course and will be judged at the end of each course. Before the appetizer round begins, the judges also announce that the finalists must incorporate the flambé technique in their first course.; Appetizer: Bryson serves marinated prawns with Creole hush puppies, a rum marinade sauce and tomato relish. Remy serves striped bass with crab mirliton salad and a satsuma-mimosa vinaigrette. Michael serves crab bisque with stone crab salad, herb oil, croutons and caviar.; The entrées begin cooking as the episode ends.
105	10	"Finale Part 2"	May 20, 2024	JRM-910	1.49
Entrée: Michael serves pan-seared halibut with sautéed purple kale, ginger-glazed carrots and a spicy herb sauce. Bryson serves wagyu filet mignon with red wine reduction, squash purée and confit turnips. Remy serves shrimp and grits with collard greens and a roasted vegetable sauce.; Dessert: Remy serves chocolate hazelnut brownie with hazelnut brittle, chocolate mousse and raspberry coulis. Bryson serves peanut butter mousse crunch cake with chocolate ganache and peanut brittle. Michael serves orange and olive oil pound cake with citrus sauce and a crème fraîche ice cream.; Final Three: Bryson McGlynn, Michael Seegobin and Remy Powell.; Winner Announced: Bryson is announced as this year's winner of MasterChef Junior, taking home the trophy and all of the prizes.; MasterChef Junior Winner: Bryson McGlynn
