= Jeffrey M. Smith =

American activist (born 1958)

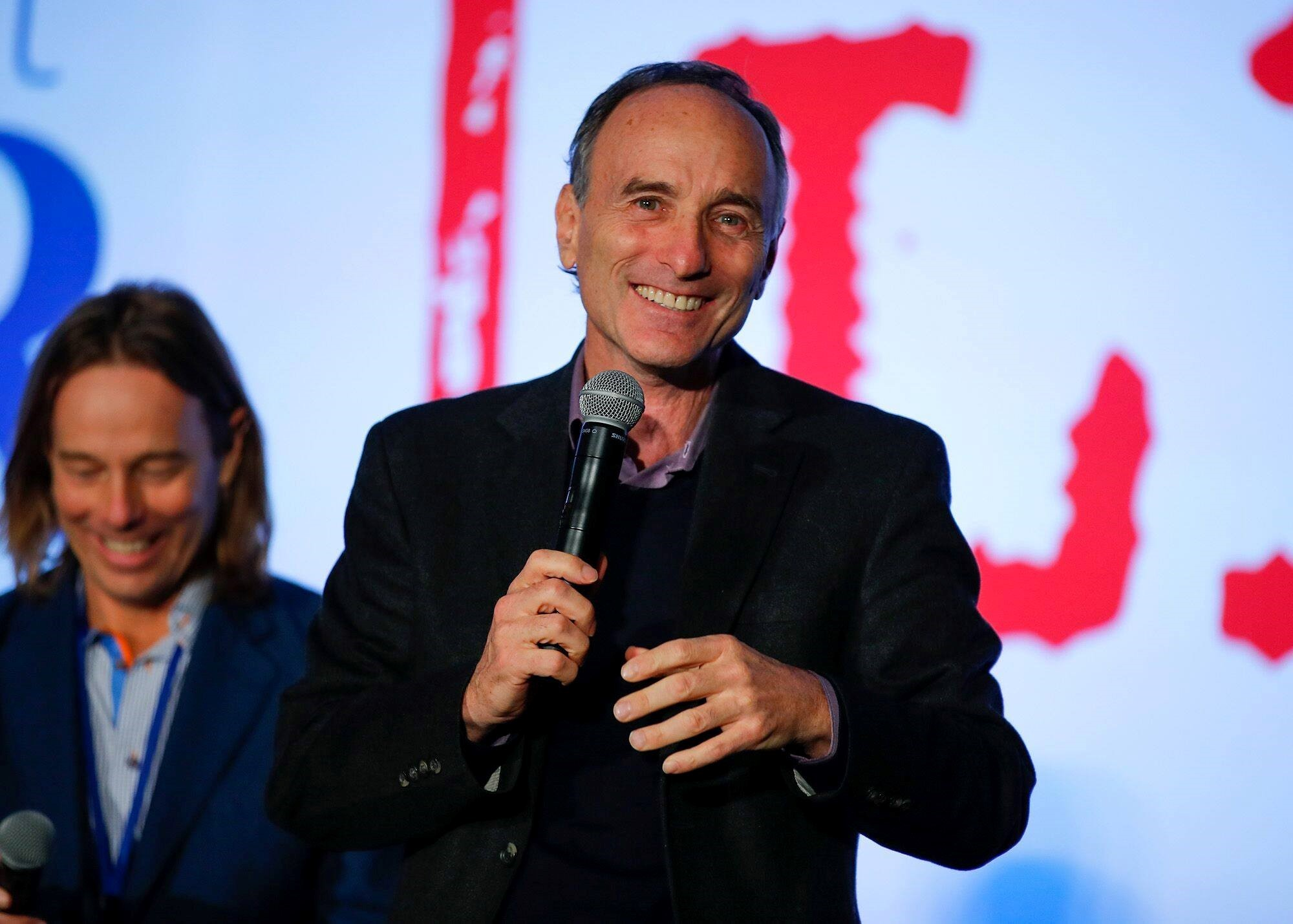
- Smith delivering speech
- Born: 1958 (age 67–68); New York, U.S.
- Education: Maharishi University of Management
- Occupations: Consumer advocate, author
- Website: www.responsibletechnology.org

Jeffrey M. Smith (born 1958) is an American consumer activist, self-published author, and former politician. He is the author of two books on genetically engineered foods, Seeds of Deception: Exposing Industry and Government Lies about the Safety of the Genetically Engineered Foods You’re Eating, and Genetic Roulette: The Gamble of Our Lives, which he made into a film in 2012. He has appeared twice on each of the shows -The Dr. Oz Show and The Doctors. Smith has worked with organic food marketers and alternative health product promoters to advocate against genetically modified food. Supporters identify Smith as an influential educator on the alleged risks associated with genetically modified foods, while others point out Smith's lack of formal scientific training. In 1998, Smith ran unsuccessfully for Congress as a candidate for the Natural Law Party. As of 2021, Smith is the executive director of the Institute for Responsible Technology, and executive director of the global campaign Protect Nature Now.

== Early life ==
Jeffrey Smith grew up in Rey Brook, Westchester County. He has a bachelors degree from SUNY Binghamton and an MBA from Maharishi University of Management in Fairfield, Iowa .

== Career ==
=== Political ===
Smith was a Natural Law Party member in 1996. In 1998 he became the party's candidate for U.S. Congress in Iowa's First District to raise awareness about GMOs. Smith received less than 1% of the vote, losing to Republican Jim Leach. Smith worked for several years as a marketing consultant and nonprofit marketing advisor.

=== Consumer activist ===
Smith has opposed the use of genetically modified foods since they were introduced in the 1990s. As of 2000, Smith was the spokesperson and vice president for the accredited genetically modified organism (GMO) testing company, Genetic ID. Smith authored the books Seeds of Deception in 2003 and Genetic Roulette in 2007. In 2012 Smith directed and produced Genetic Roulette, a documentary film narrated by Lisa Oz and critical of genetically modified food. Smith is the founder and current executive director of the Institute for Responsible Technology, which he founded in 2003.

A variety of American organic food companies see Smith "as a champion for their interests", and Smith's supporters describe him as "arguably the world's foremost expert on the topic of genetically modified foods". In contrast, others such as Michael Specter, writing in The New Yorker, reported that Smith was presented as a "scientist" on The Dr. Oz Show despite his lack of any scientific experience. Bruce Chassy, a molecular biologist and food scientist, wrote to the show arguing that Smith's "only professional experience prior to taking up his crusade against biotechnology is as a ballroom-dance teacher, yogic flying instructor, and political candidate for the Maharishi cult’s natural-law party."

== Films ==
=== Director ===
- Hidden Dangers in Kids’ Meals (2008)
- Genetic Roulette: The Gamble of Our Lives (2012)
- Your Milk on Drugs-Just Say No! (2013)
- Secret Ingredients (2018)
- Don't Let the Gene Out of the Bottle (2021)

=== Featured ===
- The World According to Monsanto (2008)
- Seeds of Death: Unveiling the Lies of GMOs (2012)
- Scientists Under Attack: Genetic Engineering in the Magnetic Field of Money (2010)

== Written work ==
=== Author ===
- Hard to Swallow: The Dangers of GE Food—An International Expose (2003)
- Seeds of Deception (2003)
- Genetic Roulette: The Documented Health Risks of Genetically Engineered Foods (2007)
