= MasterChef Junior (American TV series) season 8 =

Season of television series

MasterChef Junior
- Season 8
- Promotional poster for season 8, featuring (2nd row, L to R) judges Aarón Sanchez, Gordon Ramsay, and Daphne Oz
- Judges: Gordon Ramsay; Aarón Sanchez; Daphne Oz
- No. of contestants: 16
- Winner: Liya Chu
- Runner-up: Grayson Price
- No. of episodes: 16

Release
- Original network: Fox
- Original release: March 17 – June 23, 2022

Season chronology
- ← Previous; Season 7 Next → Season 9

The eighth season of the American competitive reality television series MasterChef Junior premiered on Fox on March 17, 2022, and concluded on June 23, 2022. Gordon Ramsay and Aarón Sanchez returned as judges from the previous season, while Daphne Oz joined as a new judge. The season was won by Liya Chu, a 10-year-old from Scarsdale, New York, with Grayson Price from Austin, Texas being the runner-up.

== Production ==
The season was filmed in 2019, prior to the COVID-19 pandemic, and was officially announced on July 17, 2019. Additionally, it was revealed that Gordon Ramsay and Aarón Sanchez would return as judges, along with new judge Daphne Oz replacing Christina Tosi.

The season was originally slated to premiere in September 2020 during the 2020–21 United States television season, but was later pushed to the 2021–22 television season, being replaced by I Can See Your Voice. On January 26, 2022, it was announced that the eighth season would premiere on March 17, 2022.

== Top 16 ==
Sources for first names and hometowns:

Contestant	Age	Hometown	Status
Liya Chu	10	Scarsdale, New York	Winner June 23
Grayson Price	11	Austin, Texas	Runner-up June 23
Ivy Childs	8	Darien, Connecticut	Eliminated June 14
Molly Leighninger	10	Springfield, Missouri	Eliminated June 2
Eva Kozar	11	Sag Harbor, New York	Eliminated June 2
A'Dan Lisaula	10	Atlanta, Georgia	Eliminated May 26
Cruz Ramirez	8	Porter Ranch, California	Eliminated May 19
Abir Bhatia	10	San Ramon, California	Eliminated May 12
Ciara Rogers	11	Bakersfield, California	Eliminated May 5
Starla Chapman	10	Bay Minette, Alabama	Eliminated April 28
Andrew Lee	10	Superior Township, Michigan	Eliminated April 21
Freddy Taylor	12	Philadelphia, Pennsylvania	Eliminated April 14
Maclain Rockett	12	South Salem, New York	Eliminated April 7
Jillian Maher	11	Yonkers, New York	Eliminated March 31
Tegan Bahm	9	Billings, Montana	Eliminated March 24
Blake Schmidt	11	Darien, Illinois	Eliminated March 17

== Elimination table ==
Place	Contestant	Episode																					
Place	Contestant	1	2		3	4		5	6		7	8		9	10		11	12		13		14	16
1	Liya	WIN	LOW	WIN	WIN	IN	IN	WIN	HIGH	IN	WIN	IN	IN	WIN	IN	WIN	WIN	WIN	IMM	WIN	IN	IN	WINNER
2	Grayson	WIN	IN	IMM	WIN	HIGH	IN	IN	IN	IN	IN	WIN	IMM	IN	HIGH	LOW	WIN	IN	LOW	IN	IN	IN	RUNNER-UP
3	Ivy	LOW	LOW	WIN	WIN	WIN	IMM	WIN	IN	IN	LOW	WIN	IMM	WIN	IN	IN	IN	IN	WIN	IN	IN	ELIM	
4	Molly	IN	IN	IMM	IN	IN	LOW	WIN	IN	IN	IN	IN	LOW	WIN	IN	LOW	WIN	IN	WIN	IN	ELIM		
5	Eva	IN	WIN	IMM	LOW	WIN	IMM	WIN	IN	IN	WIN	IN	IN	WIN	HIGH	IN	LOW	IN	ELIM				
6	A'Dan	WIN	LOW	LOW	WIN	IN	IN	LOW	IN	LOW	WIN	IN	LOW	LOW	WIN	IMM	ELIM						
7	Cruz	IN	IN	IMM	WIN	IN	IN	LOW	HIGH	IN	LOW	IN	IN	IN	IN	ELIM							
8	Abir	LOW	WIN	IMM	IN	IN	IN	IN	IN	IN	WIN	WIN	IMM	ELIM									
9	Ciara	IN	WIN	IMM	WIN	IN	IN	WIN	WIN	IMM	WIN	IN	ELIM										
10	Starla	IN	IN	IMM	LOW	WIN	IMM	WIN	IN	LOW	ELIM												
11	Andrew	IN	IN	IMM	LOW	IN	LOW	IN	IN	ELIM													
12	Freddy	IN	LOW	LOW	IN	IN	LOW	ELIM															
13	Maclain	IN	WIN	IMM	WIN	HIGH	ELIM																
14	Jillian	IN	WIN	IMM	ELIM																		
15	Tegan	IN	LOW	ELIM																			
16	Blake	ELIM																					

(WINNER) This cook won the competition.
(RUNNER-UP) This cook finished in second place.
(WIN) The cook won an individual challenge (Mystery Box Challenge, Elimination Test, Pressure Test, or Skills Challenge).
(WIN) The cook was on the winning team in the Team Challenge and directly advanced to the next round.
(HIGH) The cook was one of the top entries in the individual challenge but didn't win.
(IN) The cook was not selected as a top or bottom entry in an individual challenge.
(IN) The cook was not selected as a top or bottom entry in a Team Challenge.
(IMM) The cook did not have to compete in that round of the competition and was safe from elimination.
(LOW) The cook was one of the bottom entries in an individual challenge or Pressure Test, and advanced.
(LOW) The cook was one of the bottom entries in a Team Challenge, and they advanced.
(ELIM) The cook was eliminated.

== Episodes ==
No. overall	No. in season	Title	Original release date	Prod. code	U.S. viewers (millions)
80	1	"Junior Edition: Punch and Munch"	March 17, 2022	JRM-801	2.07
After a video highlighting the audition process, the contestants meet the judges and are informed of this year's prize package: the $100,000 cash prize, the MasterChef Junior trophy, kitchen appliances from Viking Range, countertop appliances from Breville, kitchen tools and bakeware from OXO, and a trip to Caesars Palace to eat at one of Gordon Ramsay's restaurants.: Elimination Challenge: A wall with 16 openings covered by paper is brought out and the contestants must punch through one of the openings to find their mystery ingredient. They are given 60 minutes to make a dish featuring their ingredient. The three best dishes belong to Liya, Grayson and A'Dan, and they are all safe from elimination. The bottom three dishes belong to Abir, Ivy and Blake.; Challenge Winners/Immune: A'Dan Lisaula, Grayson Price and Liya Chu; Bottom three: Abir Bhatia, Blake Schmidt and Ivy Childs; The judges choose to eliminate Blake.; Eliminated: Blake Schmidt
81	2	"Junior Edition: Taste It, Make It"	March 24, 2022	JRM-802	2.04
Team Challenge: The contestants are split into three teams of five members each, and each team has 20 minutes to make as many perfect pizzas as possible, with Daphne giving a demonstration on how to make a perfect pizza. The team with the lowest number of perfect pizzas will be in the Elimination Challenge. The contestants randomly pick straws to assign their teams. A'Dan, Freddy, Ivy, Liya and Tegan are on the White team; Abir, Ciara, Eva, Jillian and Maclain are on the Red team; Andrew, Cruz, Grayson, Molly and Starla are on the Green team. The Red team makes 12 pizzas, the White team makes 10 pizzas, and the Green team makes 11 pizzas.; Challenge Winners/Immune: Abir Bhatia, Ciara Rogers, Eva Kozar, Jillian Maher and Maclain Rockett; Immune: Andrew Lee, Cruz Ramirez, Grayson Price, Molly Leighninger and Starla Chapman; Mystery Box/Elimination Challenge: The White Team are given blindfolds in their Mystery Box, and must blindly taste a dish that Gordon prepared then recreate it. They are given five minutes to taste the dish and then 45 minutes to make their replicated dish. Liya and Ivy have the best dishes of the challenge and are safe.; Challenge Winners: Ivy Childs and Liya Chu; Bottom three: A'Dan Lisaula, Freddy Taylor and Tegan Bahm; Tegan is eliminated.; Eliminated: Tegan Bahm
82	3	"Junior Edition: All's Fair at Ren Faire"	March 31, 2022	JRM-803	1.98
Team Challenge: The contestants split into two teams of seven and have to cook at a renaissance fair for 51 medieval dressed people. Maclain is chosen as the Red Team captain, and Eva is chosen as the Blue Team captain. Maclain chooses Liya, Grayson, Ivy, Ciara, Cruz and A'Dan; while Eva chooses Jillian, Abir, Andrew, Molly, Starla and Freddy. The teams must make a dish featuring bone-in meat and a Scotch egg before the main course. The guests will decide who wins the challenge. The Red Team wins the challenge.; Challenge Winners/Immune: A'Dan Lisaula, Ciara Rogers, Cruz Ramirez, Grayson Price, Ivy Childs, Liya Chu and Maclain Rockett; Back at the Masterchef kitchen, Starla, Jillian, Andrew and Eva are called out as the bottom four.; Bottom four: Andrew Lee, Eva Kozar, Jillian Maher and Starla Chapman; Jillian is eliminated.; Eliminated: Jillian Maher
83	4	"Junior Edition: Donut Holes & Hold Your Nose"	April 7, 2022	JRM-804	2.11
Immunity Challenge: The contestants are joined by Gordon's daughter, Tilly Ramsay, and are tasked with making 50 doughnut holes with two flavors. They have 60 minutes to make their doughnut holes. Eva, Grayson, Ivy, Maclain and Starla are called up for the best five dishes. The three best dishes belong to Eva, Ivy and Starla, and all three are safe from elimination.; Challenge Winners/Immune: Eva Kozar, Ivy Childs and Starla Chapman; Mystery Box/Elimination Challenge: The other ten contestants are given disgusting ingredients and will have to make a dish featuring any of those ingredients. The bottom four dishes belong to Freddy, Molly, Maclain and Andrew.; Bottom four: Andrew Lee, Freddy Taylor, Maclain Rockett and Molly Leighninger; The judges eliminate Maclain.; Eliminated: Maclain Rockett
84	5	"Junior Edition: Daphne's Baby Shower"	April 14, 2022	JRM-805	2.01
Team Challenge: The 12 remaining contestants are split into two teams of six: The Blue Team, consisting of Andrew, Abir, Cruz, Grayson, A'Dan, and Freddy; and the Pink Team, consisting of Ivy, Starla, Eva, Ciara, Molly, and Liya. Liya and Grayson are chosen as the team captains. The teams are tasked with cooking a two-course meal consisting of an entree and dessert for 21 pregnant women, with the Blue Team having to make a chicken and the Pink Team a fish dish. The Pink Team is voted as the winner of the challenge.; Challenge winners/Immune: Ciara Rogers, Eva Kozar, Ivy Childs, Liya Chu, Molly Leighninger and Starla Chapman; After the challenge, the judges save Andrew, Abir and Grayson, leaving A'Dan, Cruz and Freddy as the bottom three.; Bottom Three: A'Dan Lisaula, Cruz Ramirez and Freddy Taylor; Freddy is eliminated.; Eliminated: Freddy Taylor
85	6	"Junior Edition: Where's Walnuts?"	April 21, 2022	JRM-806	2.04
Mystery Box Challenge: The 11 remaining contestants are given one hour to make a dish featuring walnuts. Cruz, Ciara and Liya are the top three, and Ciara wins the challenge, earning immunity from elimination.; Challenge winner/Immune: Ciara Rogers; Elimination Challenge: MasterChef Junior season seven winner Che Spiotta makes an appearance in the MasterChef kitchen for a demonstration: flambéing. The contestants are tasked with cooking a dish using fire in 45 minutes. A'Dan, Starla and Andrew are called out for having the three worst dishes.; Bottom three: A'Dan Lisaula, Andrew Lee and Starla Chapman; Andrew is eliminated.; Eliminated: Andrew Lee
86	7	"Junior Edition: Motocross Mayhem"	April 28, 2022	JRM-807	1.82
Team Challenge: the ten remaining contestants are split into two teams of five each, and the judges select the captains. Abir captains the Blue Team and chooses Grayson, Ivy, Cruz and Starla; while Molly captains the Red Team and chooses Liya, Ciara, Eva and A'Dan. The teams are taken in a monster truck fire truck to a motocross track where they must cook for 51 people including motocross and monster truck drivers and spectators. They have 60 minutes to prepare a corn dog appetizer and a grilled hearty main course. The judges announce that the captains must switch teams, putting Abir in charge of the Red Team and Molly in charge of the Blue Team. The diners select the Red Team as the winners.; Challenge Winners/Immune: A'Dan Lisaula, Abir Bhatia, Ciara Rogers, Eva Kozar and Liya Chu; The judges state that Molly and Grayson did a good job and are both safe. They then eliminate Starla.; Bottom three: Cruz Ramirez, Ivy Childs and Starla Chapman; Eliminated: Starla Chapman
87	8	"Junior Edition: Jalapeño Business"	May 5, 2022	JRM-808	1.98
Team Challenge: The top nine are randomly split into three teams of three: The Red Team, consisting of A'Dan, Cruz and Molly; the Yellow Team, consisting of Abir, Grayson and Ivy; and the Green Team, consisting of Ciara, Eva and Liya. They are tasked with preparing as many jalapeño poppers as possible in 15 minutes. The Yellow Team makes 19 poppers, winning the challenge.; Challenge winners/Immune: Abir Bhatia, Grayson Price and Ivy Childs; Mystery Box/Elimination Challenge: After receiving a demonstration from Gordon, the remaining six cooks are given one hour to cook a crab dish. The judges single out A'Dan, Ciara and Molly for presenting the three worst dishes.; Bottom Three: A'Dan Lisaula, Ciara Rogers and Molly Leighninger; Ciara is eliminated.; Eliminated: Ciara Rogers
88	9	"Junior Edition: The Big Bake Sale"	May 12, 2022	JRM-809	1.89
Team Challenge: The top eight are split into two teams of four: the Blue Team, led by Cruz, and the Red Team, led by Ivy. The Blue Team consists of Abir, A'Dan and Grayson, while the Red Team consists of Liya, Eva and Molly. The teams are given 75 minutes to prepare an array of four desserts, consisting of a cream puff, cookie, cupcake and bar, for 20 people. The judges select the Red Team as the winner.; Challenge winners/Immune: Eva Kozar, Ivy Childs, Liya Chu and Molly Leighninger; The judges then save Grayson and Cruz, leaving Abir and A'Dan to face elimination.; Bottom Two: Abir Bhatia and A'Dan Lisaula; Abir is eliminated.; Eliminated: Abir Bhatia
89	10	"Junior Edition: Totally Egg-streme!"	May 19, 2022	JRM-810	1.97
Mystery Box Challenge: The top seven are given 45 minutes to cook a dish with one of seven eggs. A'Dan, Eva and Grayson are the top three, and A'Dan wins, winning immunity from elimination.; Challenge winner/Immune: A'Dan Lisaula; The six remaining contestants are given one hour to make a steak dish using one of six cuts of beef. Liya's dish is considered the best and she wins the challenge, earning the right to have her recipe published.; Challenge winner/Immune: Liya Chu; The judges then save Ivy and Eva, putting Cruz, Grayson and Molly in the bottom three.; Bottom three: Cruz Ramirez, Grayson Price and Molly Leighninger; Cruz is eliminated.; Eliminated: Cruz Ramirez
90	11	"Junior Edition: The Restaurant Takeover"	May 26, 2022	JRM-811	1.94
Team Challenge: The top six are taken to a restaurant in downtown Los Angeles called Nomad, with the judges selecting the teams. Grayson leads the Blue Team with Liya and Molly, while Eva leads the Red Team with A'Dan and Ivy. They are tasked with preparing two appetizers and entrées from the menu, with Gordon leading the pass. The judges select the Blue Team as the winners.; Challenge winners/Immune: Grayson Price, Liya Chu and Molly Leighninger; The judges name A'Dan and Eva the bottom two.; Bottom two: A'Dan Lisaula and Eva Kozar; A'Dan is eliminated.; Eliminated: A'Dan Lisaula
91	12	"Junior Edition: Alexander in a Box"	June 2, 2022	JRM-812	2.17
Mystery Box Challenge: The top five receive a demonstration from MasterChef Junior season one winner Alexander Weiss on how to fillet a salmon. They are then given 15 minutes to fillet as many perfect portions as possible. Liya is judged to have the best performance, and she wins immunity from elimination.; Challenge winner/Immune: Liya Chu; Elimination Challenge: The remaining contestants are given 45 minutes to cook a salmon dish using the portions they successfully filleted. Ivy and Molly are saved for having the two best dishes, putting Eva and Grayson in the bottom two.; Bottom two: Eva Kozar and Grayson Price; Eva is eliminated.; Eliminated: Eva Kozar
92	13	"Junior Edition: WWE Tag Team"	June 2, 2022	JRM-813	2.00
Team Challenge: The top four participate in a tag team challenge, where they are each paired with a WWE wrestler. They are given one hour to replicate a platter of finger foods with the teams taking turns cooking and giving orders. Liya wins the challenge, winning a trip to WrestleMania, and have a huge advantage in the elimination challenge.; Challenge winner: Liya Chu; Elimination Challenge: The four contestants must keep up with Gordon in recreating his signature dish of truffle egg yolk ravioli, and are given 60 seconds to plate their dish after he finishes. Molly's dish is deemed the weakest and she is eliminated.; Eliminated: Molly Leighninger
93	14	"Junior Edition: The Semi-Final"	June 14, 2022	JRM-814	1.56
Elimination Challenge: The top three contestants are visited by their loved ones, and they have one hour to cook a dish for each of the judges that is inspired by their families. The contestant with the worst dish will be eliminated. After reviewing all of the dishes, the judges send Ivy home.; Eliminated: Ivy Childs; Finalists: Grayson Price and Liya Chu
94	15	"Junior Edition: The Road to the Finale"	June 23, 2022	SP-2220	1.70
Ramsay and Sanchez take a look back at the highlights of the season, including a countdown of the best bloopers of the year.
95	16	"Junior Edition: The Finale"	June 23, 2022	JRM-815	2.22
Season Finale: Grayson and Liya must prepare their best entrée and dessert. They will have 60 minutes to prepare each course and will be judged at the end of each course.; Entrée: Grayson serves togarashi-dusted venison loin with smoked potatoes and blackberry gastrique. Liya serves spiced duck breast with scallion pancakes and miso eggplant.; Dessert: Grayson serves Texas ruby red grapefruit curd with fennel pollen financier and pea flower sorbet. Liya serves coconut pandan panna cotta with passionfruit coulis and sesame tuile.; Final Two: Grayson Price and Liya Chu; Winner Announced: Liya is announced as this year's winner of MasterChef Junior, taking home the trophy and all of the prizes.; MasterChef Junior Winner: Liya Chu
