= Kosher.com =

Kosher food website

- Website type: Cooking website
- Available in: English
- Founded: December 2016
- Website: kosher.com

Kosher.com is a food and lifestyle media company featuring kosher recipes, videos, and articles on their website and social media accounts. Launched in December 2016, Kosher.com has grown to over 15,000 recipes and over 2,000 videos as of 2026. The website is a platform for a collection of recipes that are reprinted from cookbooks, kosher food magazine archives, and original recipes from direct contributors, making it the most diverse collection of kosher-only recipes. The site is especially known for its Jewish holiday recipe collections, especially its robust section of Passover recipes which meet the halachic criteria of kosher for Passover food, and includes other holidays like Rosh Hashanah and Hanukkah as well.

== Launch ==
Kosher.com began by creating partnerships with Jewish media companies, including Artscroll, Mishpacha Magazine, Ami Magazine, and Binah Magazine, and putting their popular kosher recipes online for the first time, where anyone can access them.

== Shows ==
=== Season One ===
The first season, 2017, featured ongoing shows centered around one person or theme. Jamie Geller starred in a show about going behind the scenes in kosher restaurants, Esty Wolbe had a show for easy family recipes, and there was a "hands and pans" style of show called Shortcuts. Naomi Nachman started her show Sunny Side Up easy fun recipes and has now recorded over 75 episodes since she began at the inception of Kosher.com

=== Season Two ===
In 2018, most of the earlier shows continued to run. In addition, a new format of show launched in the summer - a cooking competition called Food Fight. The show featured female kosher cooks and had four rounds, each one eliminating a contestant until the winner was chosen.

A few months later, Kosher.com created a new show starring Rorie Weisberg, the winner of Food Fight. Her show is called Living Full 'n Free and is about healthy cooking.

=== Season Three ===
Once again, in 2019, Kosher.com released a cooking competition in the summer. Following the format of Food Fight, the show was a four-round elimination series, but took place in Oxnard, California in a kosher restaurant, and the competitors were men. This decision got some criticism from journalists on Twitter, for featuring only men to the exclusion of women in contrast to the previous year. Jewish comedian Elon Gold served as the host of the show.

In December 2019, a new show geared for kids launched, called Nosh and Nibble. The first episodes featured Rylee Gluck, an 11 year old making dishes such as personal dessert pizzas. The show is geared for kids and will feature other children in future episodes.

=== A New Season of Food Fight, 2.0 ===
In October 2025, Kosher.com launched a show called Food Fight 2.0, a cooking competition with four women, similar in format to the first Food Fight show in 2018. The finale aired on December 6, 2025. Contestants were from Brooklyn, St. Louis, Rockland County NY, and Long Island.

== Guest appearances ==
Kosher.com has recipes contributed by well-known cookbook authors and chefs including Michael Solomonov, Deb Perelman, Einat Admony, Jamie Geller, Susie Fishbein, Chanie Apfelbaum, Naomi Nachman, Janna Gur, Gil Marks, Joan Nathan, and Laura Frankel. Admony and Apfelbaum have also appeared as guests on Kosher.com videos.
