= Jamie Geller =

American cookbook author (born 1978)

- ג'יימי גלר
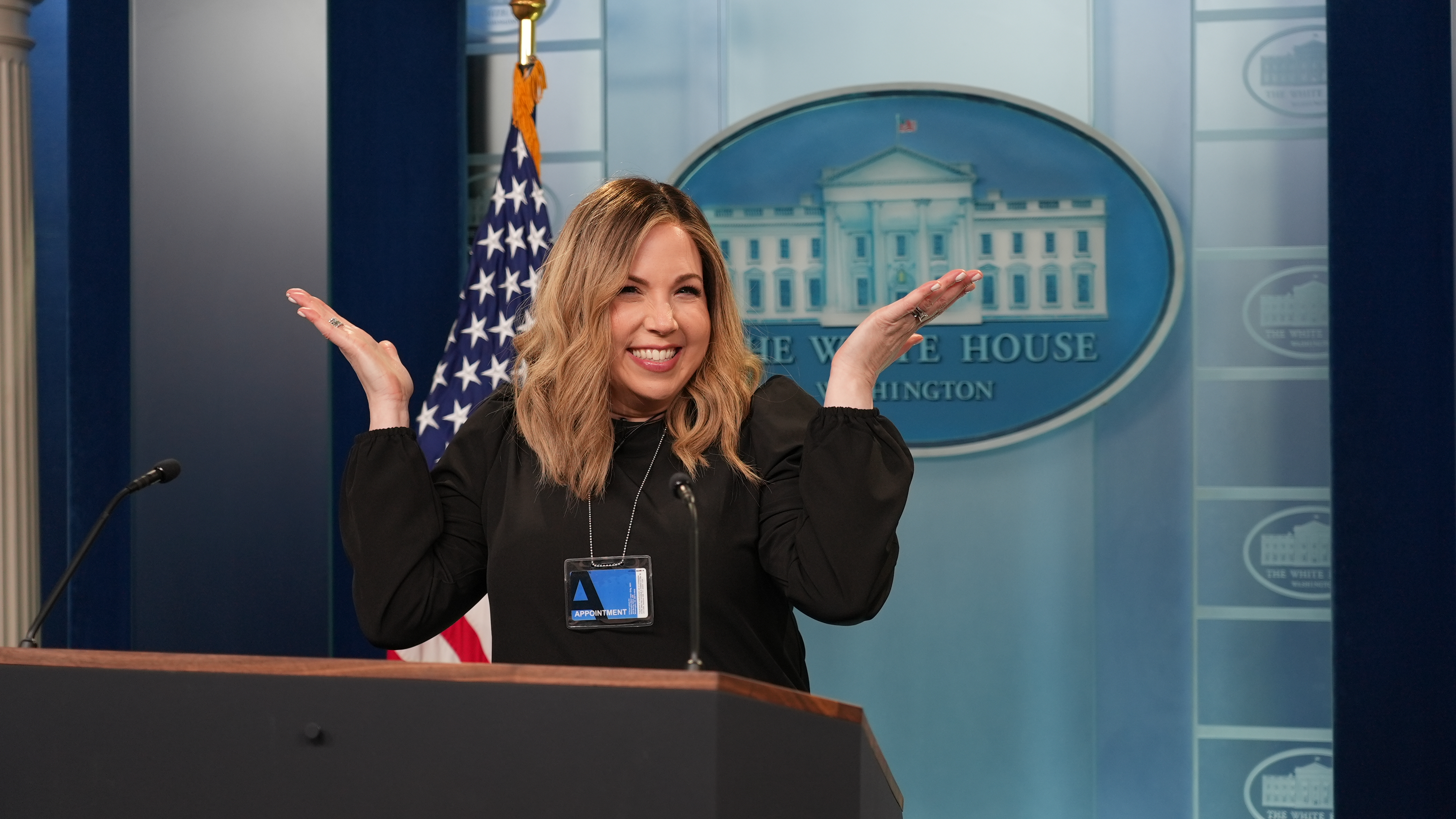
- Jamie Geller at the White House
- Born: 29 May 1978 (age 48); Philadelphia, Pennsylvania, U.S.
- Citizenship: United States (birthplace), Israel (naturalized)
- Education: New York University
- Occupations: Cookbook Author, Marketing Executive, Entrepreneur, Television Producer
- Years active: 2007–present
- Known for: Jewish cuisine
- Notable work: Joy of Kosher with Jamie Geller

YouTube information
- Channel: Jamie Geller
- Years active: 2010–present
- Genre: Cooking
- Subscribers: 46 thousand
- Views: 8.4 million
- Last updated: September 1, 2024
- Website: jamiegeller.com

Jamie Geller (Hebrew: ג'יימי גלר; born May 29, 1978) is an American best-selling cookbook author, celebrity chef, television producer and businesswoman who is the Chief Media and Marketing Officer at Aish. She is an author of 8 cookbooks and the founder of Kosher Media Network (now called Kosher Network International). In 2010, the network launched the Joy of Kosher with Jamie Geller online cooking show, print magazine and PBS Chanukah special. She has been called "The Kosher Rachael Ray" by the Miami Herald, and the Queen of Kosher. Geller has sold close to 100,000 cookbooks.

== Biography ==
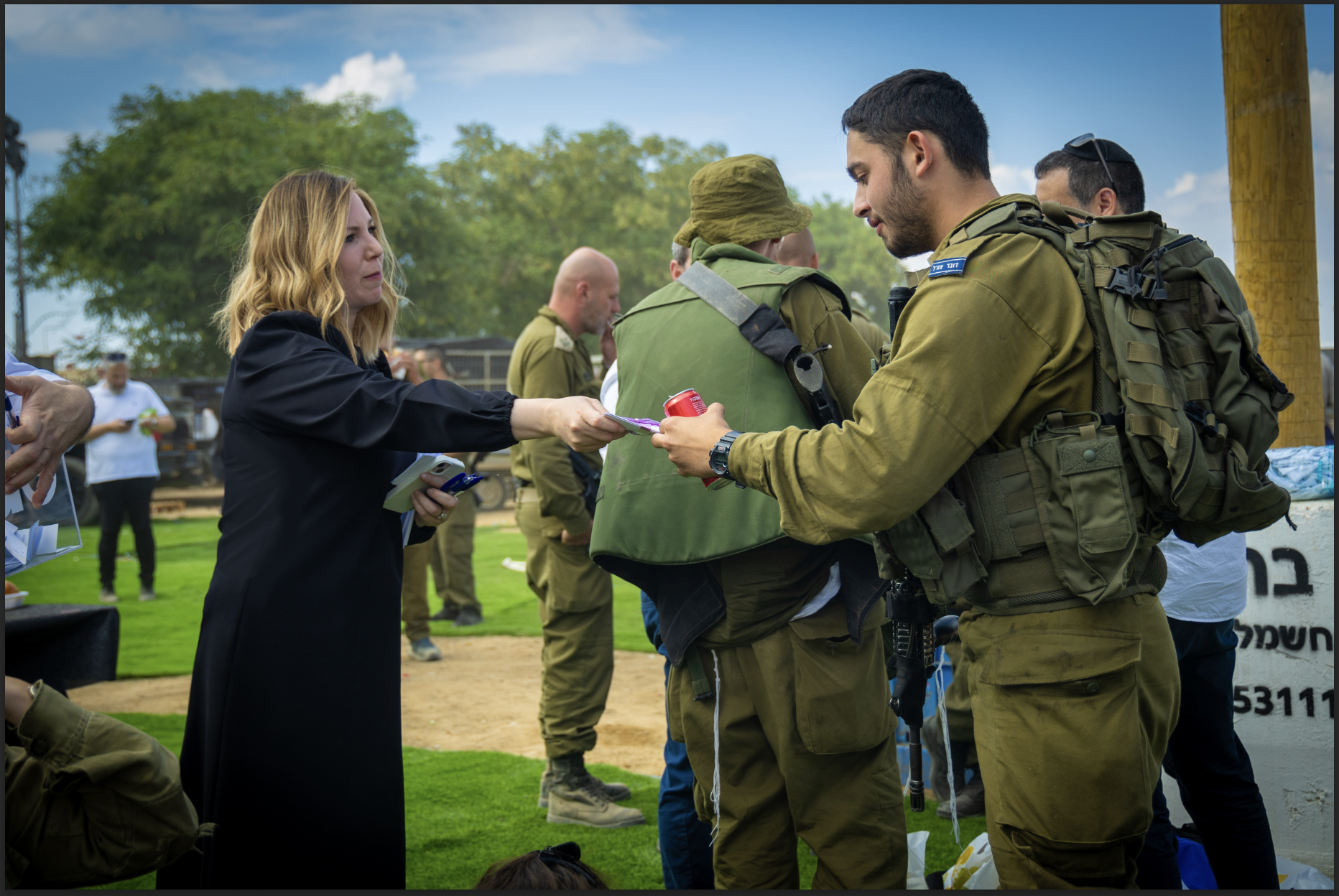
Jamie Geller at IDF Base

Jamie Geller was born in Philadelphia and raised in a Jewish home in Abington, Pennsylvania. She attended Akiba Hebrew Academy High School. At New York University Geller studied broadcast journalism and Hebrew language and literature and graduated magna cum laude, Phi Beta Kappa in May 1999. Geller is a baalat teshuva, having embraced Orthodox Judaism and traditional Jewish religious practice in her early 20s. In August 2012, Geller immigrated to Israel and settled in Beit Shemesh.

== Media and food-writing career ==
Before writing her first cookbook, Geller was a writer and television producer for CNN, Entertainment News, the Food Network, and a senior writer/producer and marketing executive for HBO.

In 2007, Geller published Quick and Kosher Recipes from the Bride Who Knew Nothing (ISBN 978-1-60094-053-8) (Feldheim Publishers). The book chronicles her experience of choosing Orthodox Judaism, her marriage and learning to cook. In 2010 Geller published Quick & Kosher: Meals in Minutes (Feldheim Publishers). She didn't know how to cook before she got married but learned out of necessity. In over 15 years of experience, she's published 8 books, a website with over 10,000 recipes and videos with over 1 billion views.

In 2021, Geller launched a product line that included spices, honey, and pilaf. That same year, Geller partnered with Aish to create a media network. Geller was named as Aish’s new Chief Media and Marketing Officer. She also writes recipes for kosher.com. Kosher Network International which includes JamieGeller.com, @jamiegeller, and @jewlishbyjamie, was named the No. 1 global kosher food media company and Jewish food network. The Jewish food and lifestyle brands have over 2 million followers across social media.

== Published works ==
- Quick & Kosher Recipes from the Bride Who Knew Nothing (2007, Feldheim Publishers)
- Quick & Kosher: Meals in Minutes (2010, Feldheim Publishers)
- Joy of Kosher with Jamie Geller (a magazine)
- Joy of Kosher: Fast, Fresh Family Recipes (2013, William Morrow)
- No Mistaking Baking: 85+ foolproof, fail proof, perfect every time recipes (2018)
- Jamie Geller's Brisket 101 (2018)
- Jewlish by Jamie (2020, Feldheim Publishers)
- 28 Day Joy of Kosher Challenge (2020, Blurb)
- Farmer’s Kitchen: 50 Recipes Celebrating Israel’s Veggies and Their Growers (2022)
