= The Chew =

American talk show

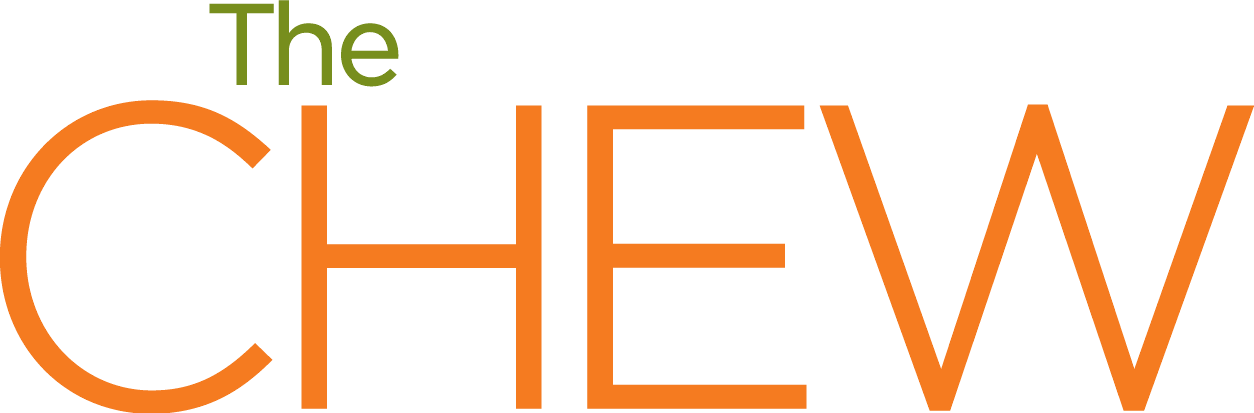
- Genre: Talk show
- Presented by: Mario Batali; Carla Hall; Clinton Kelly; Daphne Oz; Michael Symon
- Narrated by: Gordon Elliott
- Country of origin: United States
- Original language: English
- No. of seasons: 7
- No. of episodes: 1,500

Production
- Executive producers: Gordon Elliott; Mark Schneider; Aimee Rosen Householder
- Production locations: ABC Studios, Lincoln Square, Manhattan
- Camera setup: Multiple
- Running time: 42 minutes
- Production company: Follow Productions (uncredited)

Original release
- Network: ABC
- Release: September 26, 2011 – June 28, 2018

The Chew is an American cooking-themed talk show that aired for seven seasons from September 26, 2011, to June 28, 2018, having replaced the soap opera All My Children, on ABC as part of the network's weekday daytime lineup. The name was inspired by fellow ABC talk show The View, but The Chew centered on food and lifestyle topics rather than the news of the day.

For most of the show's run, it was hosted by chefs Mario Batali, Carla Hall and Michael Symon, wellness expert Daphne Oz, and Clinton Kelly (who served as the show's moderator). Oz left in August 2017, while Batali left in December 2017, and was later officially terminated, amid sexual misconduct allegations from some of his restaurant workers. The five co-hosts won the Daytime Emmy Award for Outstanding Informative Talk Show Host in 2015.

On May 23, 2018, ABC announced that it was canceling The Chew. The show aired its final episode on June 15, 2018, with pre-recorded episodes airing until June 28, 2018. Reruns of The Chew continued airing until September 7, 2018. On September 10, 2018, ABC replaced The Chew with the Good Morning America brand extension GMA Day (which later became GMA3).

== Production ==
The Chew was produced by British-Australian former talk show host Gordon Elliott, who also served as the show's announcer with occasional on-camera roles. The show was taped at ABC's Lincoln Square facilities at 30 West 67th Street on Manhattan's Upper West Side.

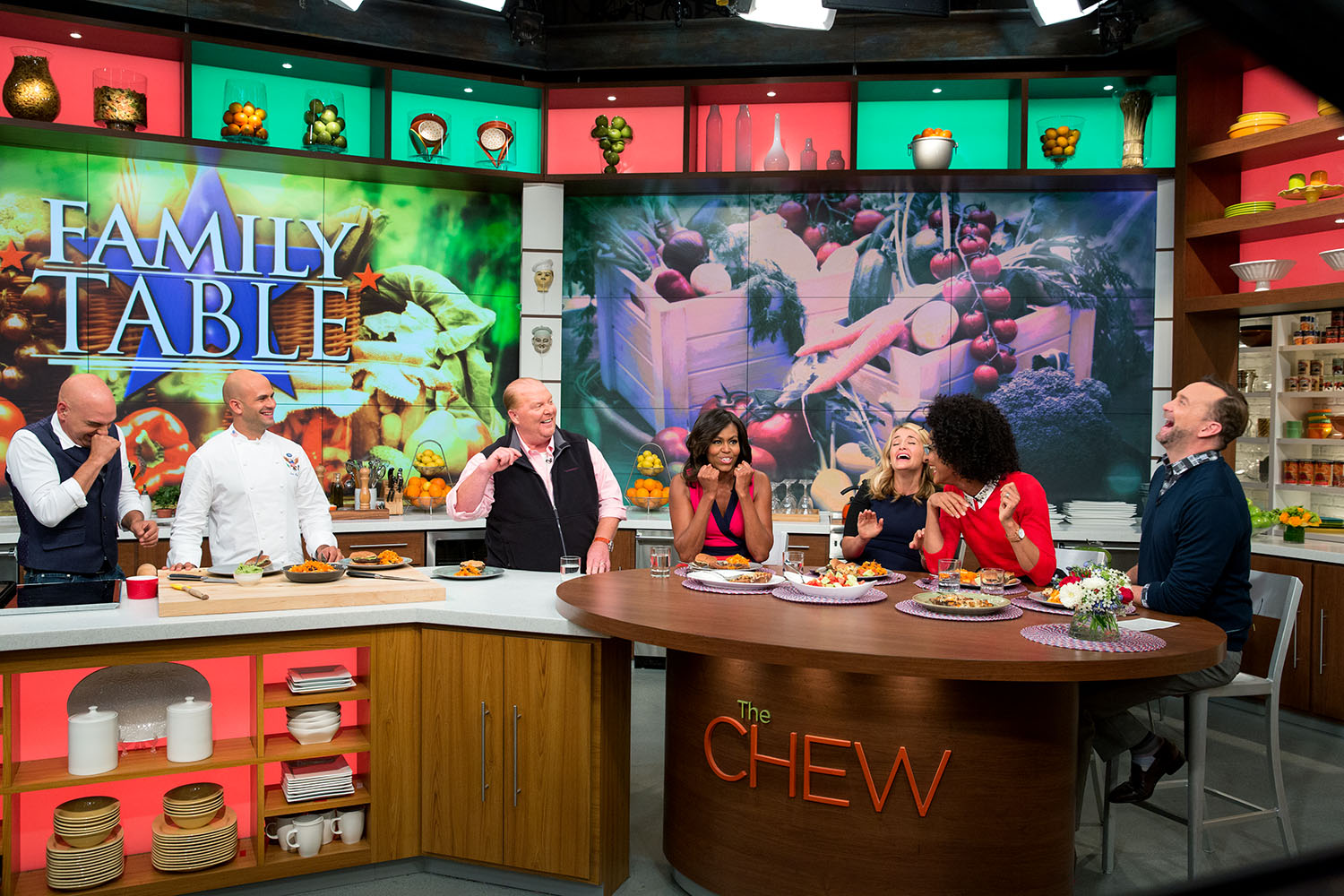
First Lady Michelle Obama tapes a segment of The Chew in New York on September 23, 2014. Participants with the First Lady from left are Michael Symon, "Let's Move!" Executive Director Sam Kass, Mario Batali, Daphne Oz, Carla Hall and Clinton Kelly.

== Broadcast ==
The Chew aired at 1:00 pm Eastern/12 noon Central, the slot formerly occupied by the long-running soap opera All My Children. ABC stations in the Mountain and Pacific time zones, and in Alaska and Hawaii follow a Central time zone schedule for daytime programming; thus, The Chew was scheduled by the network to air at 12 noon in these areas.

A limited number of ABC affiliates in the Central Time Zone aired the program on a one-day delay at 11:00 am (maintaining the delay schedule All My Children followed before it was ended, thus delaying Friday's episode to Monday) in order to continue airing their noon hour local newscasts such as WFAA in Dallas, KRGV-TV in Weslaco, Texas and WBRZ-TV in Baton Rouge, Louisiana; three stations, WBAY-TV in Green Bay, Wisconsin, KSAT-TV in San Antonio and KMIZ in Columbia, Missouri, had network permission to tape-delay the program same-day to avert situations where episodes with recipes timed to a specific holiday were rendered useless due to the delay.

The Chew aired on week-delay basis weeknights at 8:00 pm Eastern 7:00 pm Central on the Live Well Network. The program also aired in Canada on City.

== Awards and nominations ==
Year	Award	Category	Honorees	Result
2014	Daytime Emmy Award	Outstanding Talk Show/Informative	The Chew	Nominated
2015	Daytime Emmy Award	Outstanding Talk Show/Informative	The Chew	Nominated
2015	Daytime Emmy Award	Outstanding Informative Talk Show Host	Batali, Hall, Kelly, Oz and Symon	Won
2016	Daytime Emmy Award	Outstanding Talk Show/Informative	The Chew	Won
2016	Daytime Emmy Award	Outstanding Informative Talk Show Host	Batali, Hall, Kelly, Oz and Symon	Nominated
2017	Daytime Emmy Award	Outstanding Talk Show/Informative	The Chew	Nominated
2018	Daytime Emmy Award	Outstanding Talk Show/Informative	The Chew	Nominated
