= Drive-In (film) =

1976 film by Rod Amateau

- Theatrical release poster
- Directed by: Rod Amateau
- Written by: Bob Peete
- Produced by: Tamara Asseyev; Alexandra Rose
- Starring: Lisa Lemole; Gary Lee Cavagnaro; Glenn Morshower; Billy Milliken; Lee Newsom; Regan Kee
- Cinematography: Robert C. Jessup
- Edited by: Bernard Caputo; Guy Scarpitta
- Production company: George Litto Productions
- Distributed by: Columbia Pictures
- Release date: May 26, 1976
- Running time: 96 minutes
- Country: United States
- Language: English

Drive-In is a 1976 American comedy film directed by Rod Amateau and written by Bob Peete. The film stars Lisa Lemole, Gary Lee Cavagnaro, Glenn Morshower, Billy Milliken, Lee Newsom and Regan Kee.

== Plot ==
"Disaster '76", the latest disaster film, is playing at The Alamo, a drive-in theater in a small Texas town. The night brings together a young couple, two rival youth gangs, a pair of thieves planning to rob the drive-in, a nervous doctor and a host of other characters.

== Cast ==
- Lisa Lemole as Glowie Hudson
- Gary Lee Cavagnaro as Little Bit
- Glenn Morshower as Orville Hennigson
- Billy Milliken as Enoch
- Lee Newsom as Widow Maker
- Regan Kee as Spoon
- Andy Parks as Widow Maker
- Trey Wilson as Gifford
- Gordon Hurst as Will Henry
- Kent Perkins as Bill Hill
- Ashley Cox as Mary Louise
- Louis Zito as Manager
- Linda Larimer as Cashier
- Barry Gremillion as Diddle Brown
- David Roberts as Gear Grinder
- Phil Ferrell as Gear Grinder
- Joe Flower as Gear Grinder
- Carla Palmer as Glowie's Friend
- Carrie Jessup as Glowie's Friend
- Gloria Shaw as Mrs. Demars
- Bill McGhee as Dr. Demars
- Jessie Lee Fulton as Mom
- Robert Valgova as Boss
- Michelle Franks as Omalee Ledbetter
- Jack Isbell as Divinity Student
- Dejah Moore as Waitress
- Curtis Posey as Deputy
- Billy Vance White as Deputy
- Hank Stohl as Sherman Vance

== Release ==
It was released on May 26, 1976, by Columbia Pictures in the Bay Area in more than 25 theaters as well as in Reno, Stockton and Sacramento. On May 28, it opened in 40 theaters in the Chicago area as well as in Milwaukee and Indiana.

== Reception ==
Lawrence Van Gelder of The New York Times wrote, "'Drive-In' possesses the virtue of fresh faces, the drawback of uneven acting, the irritation of occasional overwriting and the limited appeal of what is basically a juvenile story." Arthur D. Murphy of Variety called the film an "easy-going and likeable George Litto production. Rod Amateau's direction of Bob Peete's script turns the liabilities of low-budget production and largely unknown performers into creative assets by virtue of the simplicity and sincerity of the results." Gene Siskel of the Chicago Tribune gave the film two stars out of four, describing the humor as insult comedy typical of TV shows like Hee Haw and expressing his wish that "the script of 'Drive-In' had been trashed and 'Disaster '76' had been fully made instead". Kevin Thomas of the Los Angeles Times called it "a shrewdly made exploitation picture, undoubtedly indebted to 'American Graffiti' but played very, very broadly to reach the most unsophisticated of audiences. Yet as corny as it so often gets, it's consistently funny."
