= Ashley Cox =

American model and actress

Playboy centerfold appearance
- December 1977
- Preceded by: Rita Lee (playboy)
- Succeeded by: Debra Jensen

Personal details
- Born: November 15, 1956 (age 69) Dallas, Texas, U.S.

Ashley Cox (born November 15, 1956) is an American model and actress.

== Career ==
Cox was Playboy magazine's Playmate of the Month for its December 1977 issue. Her centerfold was photographed by Mario Casilli. Cox was one of Hugh Hefner's "Personal Playmates", a term Hefner designated women whom he dated seriously.

Cox appeared in films such as Logan's Run (1976), Drive-In (1976), The Nude Bomb (1980), King of the Mountain (1981), Looker (1981), and Night Shift (1982).

== Personal life ==
She has two children and, as she told The Playboy Book in 1996:

I've been married several times, and I'm still looking for my knight in shining armor. Men think they want a fantasy girl, but when they meet somebody who's been a centerfold and dated a couple of well-known actors, I think that overwhelms them.

== Filmography ==
=== Film ===
Year	Title	Role	Notes
1976	Drive-In	Mary Louise	
1976	Logan's Run	Timid Girl	
1980	The Nude Bomb	Model #1	
1981	King of the Mountain	Elaine	
1981	Looker	Candy	
1982	Night Shift	Jenny Lynn	

=== Television ===
Year	Title	Role	Notes
1979	The Dukes of Hazzard	Garbade's Girl	Episode: "Road Pirates"
1980	Vegas	Loyal Rutledge	Episode: "The Lido Girls"

Susan Kiger	Star Stowe	Nicki Thomas	Lisa Sohm	Sheila Mullen	Virve Reid
Sondra Theodore	Julia Lyndon	Debra Jo Fondren	Kristine Winder	Rita Lee	Ashley Cox
