= Daytime Emmy Award for Outstanding Informative Talk Show Host =

Former television award

- Awarded for: Outstanding Host in an Informative Talk Show
- Country: United States
- Presented by: NATAS/ATAS
- First award: April 26, 2015
- Final award: June 24, 2022
- Currently held by: Tamron Hall for Tamron Hall (2022)
- Website: theemmys.tv/daytime/

The Daytime Emmy Award for Outstanding Informative Talk Show Host was an award presented annually by the National Academy of Television Arts and Sciences (NATAS) and Academy of Television Arts & Sciences (ATAS). The award was given in honor of a talk show host that was in the informative nature. It was awarded from the 42nd Daytime Emmy Awards ceremony, held in 2015, to the 49th Daytime Emmy Awards ceremony, held in 2022. During this period, the generic Outstanding Talk Show Host category was split into two specific categories: this award and Outstanding Entertainment Talk Show Host. In 2023, the NATAS will merge the two specific categories back into one.

== Winners and nominees ==
Table key
‡	Indicates the winner
†	Indicates a posthumous winner

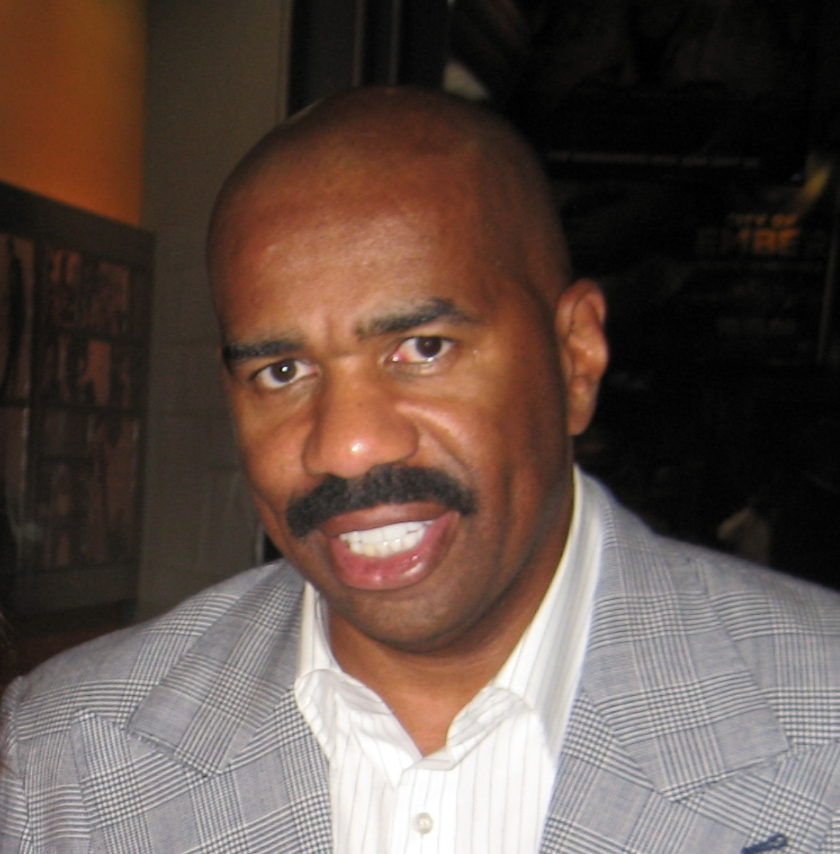
Steve Harvey received five nominations, winning in 2017 and 2018.

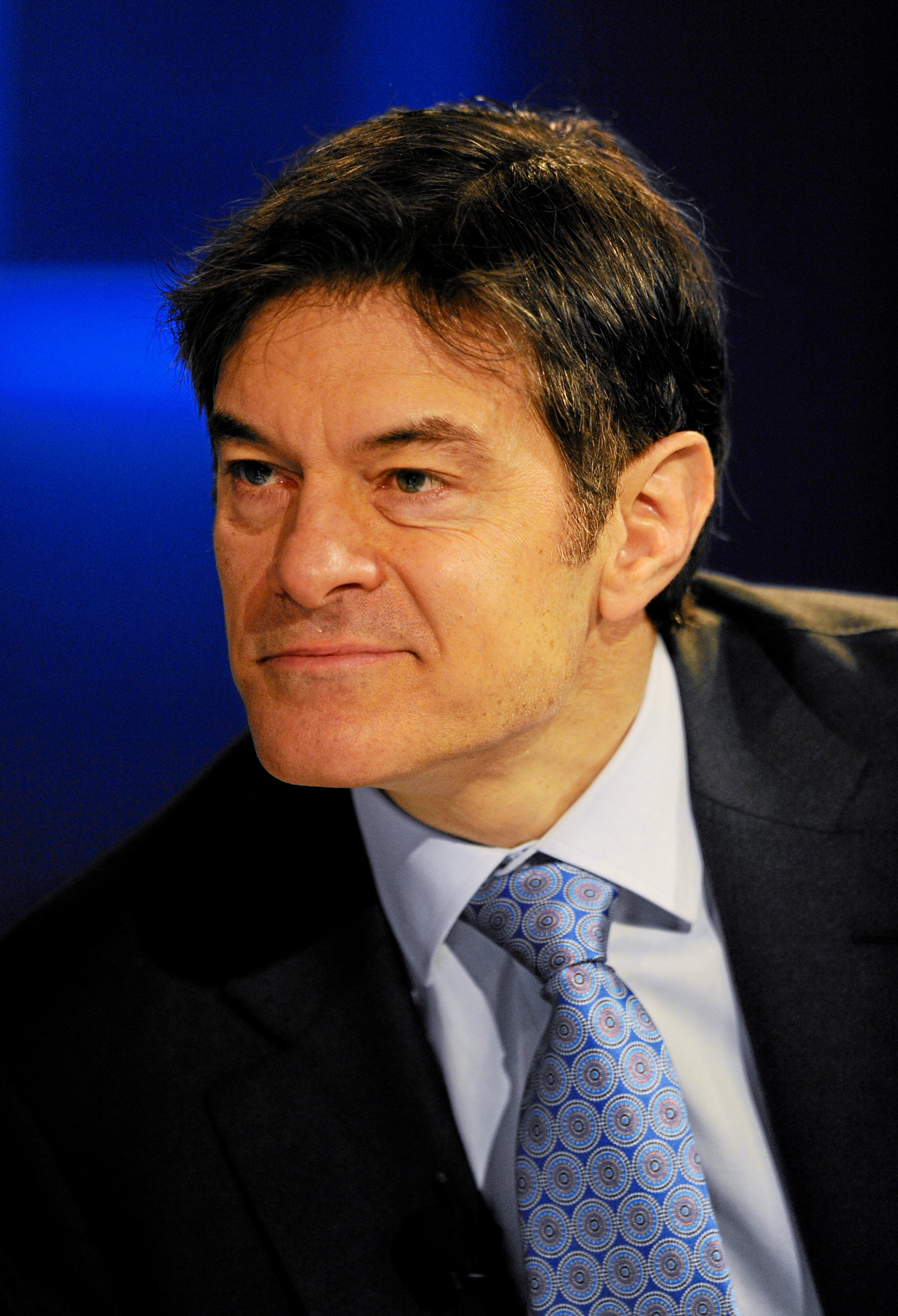
Mehmet Oz received five consecutive nominations, winning in 2016 for hosting The Dr. Oz Show.

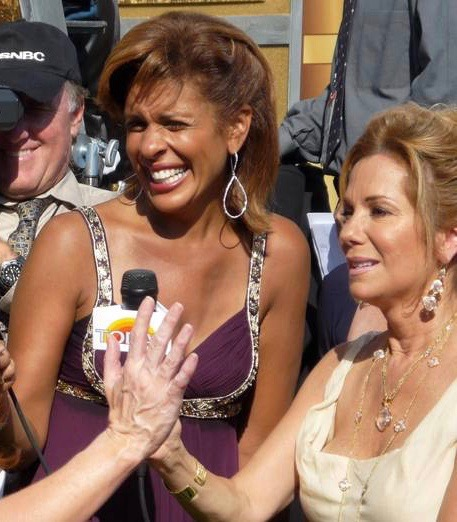
Hoda Kotb (left) and Kathie Lee Gifford (right) won in 2019 for their co-hosting duties on Today with Kathie Lee and Hoda.

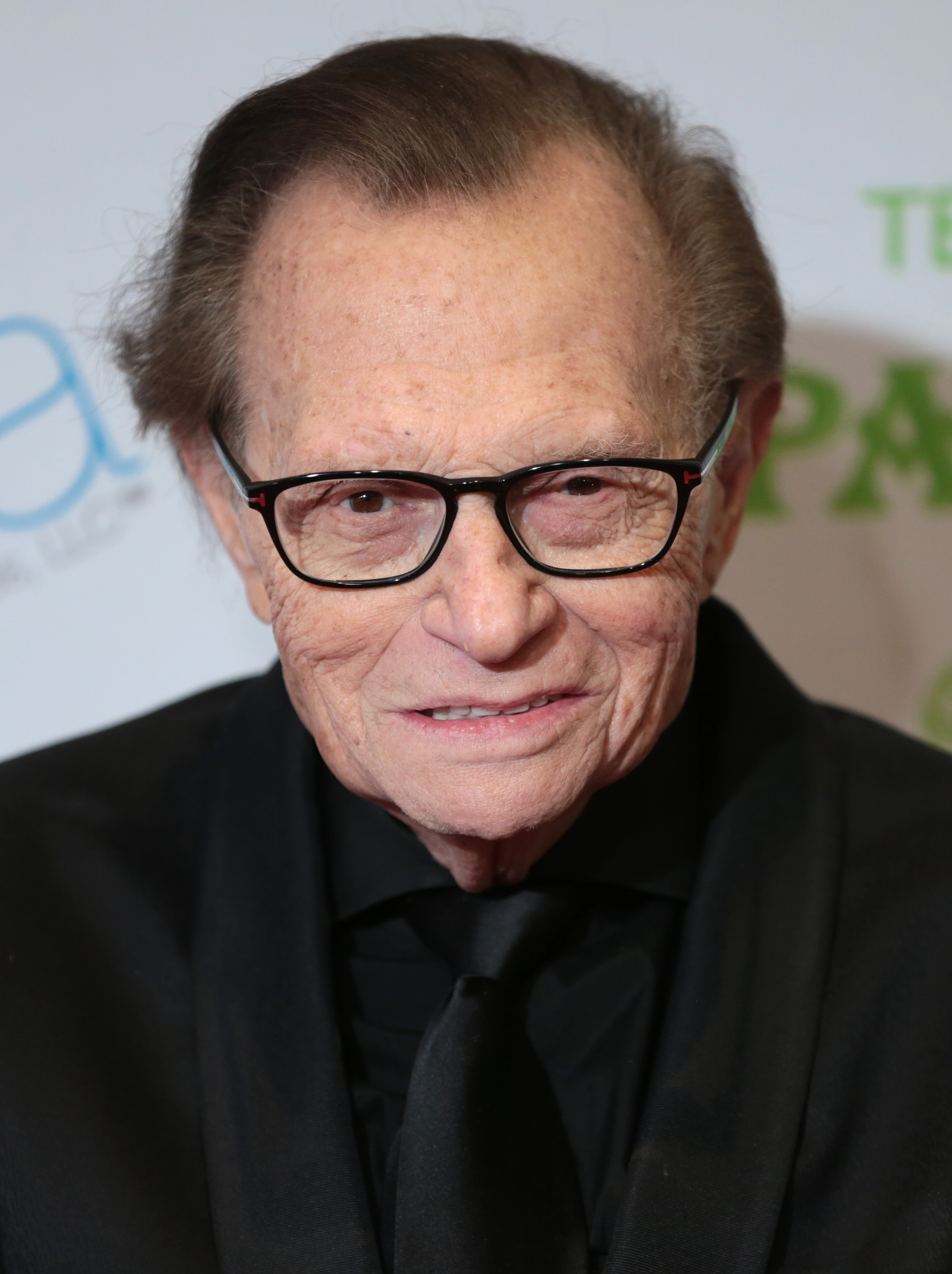
Larry King won in 2021, becoming the first host to win in this category posthumously.

=== 2010s ===
Year	Host(s)	Program	Network	Ref.
2015 (42nd)	Mario Batali, Carla Hall, Clinton Kelly, Daphne Oz and Michael Symon ‡	The Chew	ABC	
2015 (42nd)	Mehmet Oz	The Dr. Oz Show	Syndicated	
2015 (42nd)	Steve Harvey	Steve Harvey	Syndicated	
2016 (43rd)	Mehmet Oz ‡	The Dr. Oz Show	Syndicated	
2016 (43rd)	Mario Batali, Carla Hall, Clinton Kelly, Daphne Oz and Michael Symon	The Chew	ABC	
2016 (43rd)	Larry King	Larry King Now	Ora TV	
2016 (43rd)	Peter Salgo	Second Opinion	PBS	
2016 (43rd)	Steve Harvey	Steve Harvey	Syndicated	
2017 (44th)	Steve Harvey ‡	Steve Harvey	Syndicated	
2017 (44th)	Mario Batali, Carla Hall, Clinton Kelly, Daphne Oz and Michael Symon	The Chew	ABC	
2017 (44th)	Mehmet Oz	The Dr. Oz Show	Syndicated	
2017 (44th)	Sunny Anderson, Katie Lee, Jeff Mauro, Marcela Valladolid and Geoffrey Zakarian	The Kitchen	Food Network	
2017 (44th)	Larry King	Larry King Now	Ora TV	
2017 (44th)	Chris Hedges	On Contact	RT	
2018 (45th)	Steve Harvey ‡	Steve	Syndicated	
2018 (45th)	Kit Hoover and Natalie Morales	Access Hollywood Live	NBC	
2018 (45th)	Kellie Pickler and Ben Aaron	Pickler & Ben	CMT	
2018 (45th)	Mehmet Oz	The Dr. Oz Show	Syndicated	
2018 (45th)	Larry King	Larry King Now	Ora TV	
2019 (46th)	Kathie Lee Gifford and Hoda Kotb ‡	Today Show with Kathie Lee & Hoda	NBC	
2019 (46th)	Mehmet Oz	The Dr. Oz Show	Syndicated	
2019 (46th)	Steve Harvey	Steve	Syndicated	
2019 (46th)	Rachael Ray	Rachael Ray	Syndicated	
2019 (46th)	Kellie Pickler and Ben Aaron	Pickler & Ben	CMT	

=== 2020s ===
Year	Host(s)	Program	Network	Ref.
2020 (47th)	Tamron Hall ‡	Tamron Hall	Syndicated	
2020 (47th)	Larry King	Larry King Now	Ora TV	
2020 (47th)	Jada Pinkett Smith, Willow Smith, and Adrienne Banfield-Norris	Red Table Talk	Facebook Watch	
2020 (47th)	Hoda Kotb and Jenna Bush Hager	Today with Hoda & Jenna	NBC	
2020 (47th)	Whoopi Goldberg, Joy Behar, Sunny Hostin, Meghan McCain, Abby Huntsman, and Ana Navarro	The View	ABC	
2021 (48th)	Larry King † (posthumous)	Larry King Now	Ora TV	
2021 (48th)	Gloria Estefan, Emily Estefan and Lili Estefan	Red Table Talk: The Estefans	Facebook Watch	
2021 (48th)	Tamron Hall	Tamron Hall	Syndicated	
2021 (48th)	Rachael Ray	Rachael Ray	Syndicated	
2021 (48th)	Taraji P. Henson & Tracie Jade	Peace of Mind with Taraji	Facebook Watch	
2021 (48th)	Amy Robach, T. J. Holmes and Jennifer Ashton	GMA3: What You Need To Know	ABC	
2021 (48th)	Jada Pinkett Smith, Willow Smith, and Adrienne Banfield-Norris	Red Table Talk	Facebook Watch	
2022 (49th)	Tamron Hall ‡	Tamron Hall	Syndicated	
2022 (49th)	Gloria Estefan, Emily Estefan and Lili Estefan	Red Table Talk: The Estefans	Facebook Watch	
2022 (49th)	Whoopi Goldberg, Joy Behar, Sunny Hostin, Meghan McCain, Sara Haines, and Ana Navarro	The View	ABC	
2022 (49th)	Taraji P. Henson & Tracie Jade	Peace of Mind with Taraji	Facebook Watch	
2022 (49th)	Robin Roberts	Turning the Tables with Robin Roberts	Disney+	

== Multiple wins ==
2 wins

- Steve Harvey
- Tamron Hall

== Multiple nominations ==
5 nominations

- Steve Harvey
- Mehmet Oz

3 nominations

- Mario Batali
- Carla Hall
- Tamron Hall
- Clinton Kelly
- Larry King
- Daphne Oz
- Michael Symon
