= ID (public relations) =

Public relations firm

- Type: Private
- Industry: Public relations Advertising; Digital marketing Marketing
- Founded: 1993
- Headquarters: Los Angeles, California
- Key people: Kelly Bush Novak (founder and CEO), Mara Buxbaum (president), Lisa Halliday (CCO)
- Website: id-pr.com

ID is an independently owned and operated public relations firm. ID works with actors, directors, writers, musicians, brands, corporations and production companies.

ID was established in 1993 by Kelly Bush Novak. It is headquartered in Los Angeles, California, with an office in New York City.

== History ==
Kelly Bush founded ID in 1993, after having acquired two years of business experience. Her first major client was Patrick Stewart, who was represented by Bush up until his death in October 2026. Bush's longtime clients include Tobey Maguire, Diane Lane, Ben Stiller, Catherine Keener, Alicia Keys and Paul Reubens; she also consults with Warner Bros. Pictures Group as well as Sony Pictures Classics. In 2008, Bush formed VIE Entertainment where she became manager to Paul Reubens and Academy-award nominated actor Elliot Page.

A 2011 New York Times profile described the firm as one of “a handful of elite firms that protect and promote the biggest names in show business..” and mentioned clients including Paul Reubens (Pee Wee Herman), Ben Stiller, Tobey Maguire, Amy Adams, Josh Brolin, Natalie Portman, Sean Penn and others.

Drake and the company had a high-profile parting in 2014.

ID was ranked 5th on Forbes List of America's Best PR Agencies 2021.
