= The Good Dish =

American cooking talk show (2022)

- Genre: Cooking talk show
- Presented by: Daphne Oz; Jamika Pessoa; Gail Simmons
- Country of origin: United States
- Original language: English
- No. of seasons: 1
- No. of episodes: 87

Production
- Production location: CBS Broadcast Center
- Camera setup: Multiple
- Running time: 41 minutes
- Production companies: Emerald City Media; Sony Pictures Television

Original release
- Network: Syndication
- Release: January 17 – May 25, 2022

Related
- The Dr. Oz Show

The Good Dish is an American cooking-themed talk show produced by Sony Pictures Television that aired for one season from January 17, 2022, to May 25, 2022, having replaced the talk show The Dr. Oz Show when host Mehmet Oz voluntarily ended his show to comply with election laws that prevent a political candidate from using a national platform during election season due to equal time rules as he instead focused on his Pennsylvania Senate Race. The Good Dish was co-hosted by Dr. Oz's daughter Daphne Oz, and co-hosts Gail Simmons and Jamika Pessoa.

The Good Dish is a "food-centric spinoff of 'Dr. Oz'... based on segments from Oz's show that offer recipes and kitchen shortcuts." The title is meant as a pun, where “the influential hosts dish on entertaining topics of the day while preparing delectable dishes.” Originally, Vanessa Williams was set to be a fourth co-host.

The show was canceled two months after debuting.

== Format ==
The show normally started with a short teaser about the upcoming guests on that day's episode. Then a voiceover would say "let's dish." A short intro for each host would play. Oz was known as "the trendsetter" and her tagline was "The kitchen has always been at the center of my world, because life is more delicious when it's full of food and fun."

Simmons' was listed as "The Food Judge" and her intro line was "Everybody knows me as a culinary expert and food judge on television, but also, I'm just a mom trying to get dinner on the table." Pessoa's label was the "Celebrity Caterer" and her intro line was "from Hollywood to Home, I bring southern sweet and Caribbean heat, and I'm not afraid to stir the pot."

Then a voiceover would say the tagline of the show - "good friends, good food, good dish." The co-hosts would walk out to the on-set kitchen and begin talking about the theme food for that show (often built around pop culture events like the Super Bowl or Valentine's Day). They would then introduce the first guest of the day who would make the first recipe with them.

in the second act, they'd make a second recipe, sometimes with a second guest. The third act was usually focused on talking and would be called "dishin' with ____ (the guest's name)." This would sometimes include a recipe or craft.

The last act would normally have something that played in with the theme of the day. For instance, on the Valentine's episode, they played a makeshift version of The Dating Game. The show ends with the three co-hosts, and sometimes one or more of the earlier guests, usually sitting at a small table, eating food that had been made during the show, making small talk and looking back on the show they'd just done.
