= Lisa Oz =

American author and radio host (born 1963)

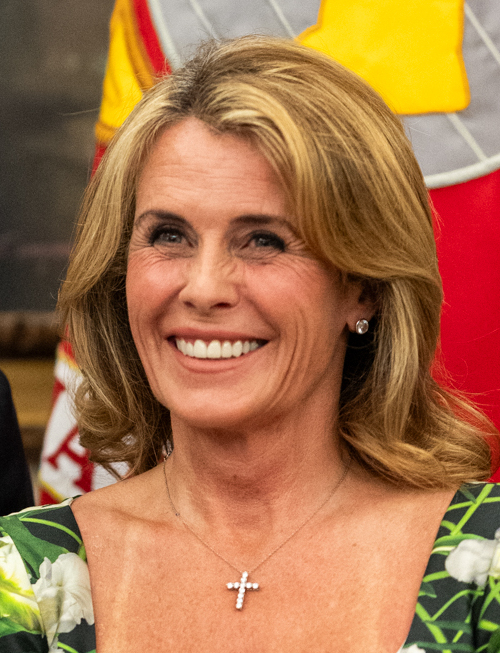
- Oz in 2025
- Born: Lisa Jane Lemole; July 20, 1963 (age 63); Philadelphia, Pennsylvania, U.S.
- Education: Bryn Mawr College (BA); Union Theological Seminary
- Occupations: Author, radio and television personality
- Known for: Books on health, relationships, and life-transformation
- Spouse: Mehmet Oz (m. 1985)
- Children: 4, including Daphne

Lisa Jane Oz (Note: Turkish: Öz) (née Lemole, born July 20, 1963) is an American author and radio and television personality who has been an occasional co-host of The Dr. Oz Show. She has appeared on the Oprah and Friends XM radio telecasts. Oz has authored or co-authored several books, including the You: The Owner's Manual series, and is host of The Lisa Oz Show.

== Early life and education ==
Lisa Jane Lemole was born in Philadelphia in 1963 to Gerald Michael Lemole and Emily Jane Lemole (née Asplundh). She is of Italian and Swedish descent. Her father was a surgeon who was on the team that performed one of the early heart transplants in the US in 1968 with doctors Michael E. DeBakey and Denton Cooley at the Texas Heart Institute. Her paternal family has roots in Staten Island for generations. Her maternal family immigrated from Sweden. Her maternal grandfather, Carl Hj Asplundh, was one of the co-founders of tree pruning service Asplundh. Emily Lemole has served as a commissioner of Lower Moreland Township in Pennsylvania. She also is part of the family that owns the Asplundh tree-trimming empire. Her father, the late Carl Hj. Asplundh, co-founded the Asplundh Tree Expert Co. in Willow Grove, Pa.

Lemole received her undergraduate degree from Bryn Mawr College in 1985, where she was captain of her college tennis team. She attended Union Theological Seminary and has written on spiritual studies. She is a Reiki master and has spoken widely of her insights into energy and health. She was an actress, appearing in a few episodes of Dallas, as well as small parts in movies Drive-In, Jake's Way, and He's Not Your Son.

== Career ==
She is also an occasional contributor to Good Day New York, WNYW. She has been on The New York Times Best Seller list six times for her best selling books, including the US: Transforming Ourselves and the Relationships that Matter Most and the You: The Owner's Manual series.

She suggested the idea that her husband do his own show based on "practicing preventive medicine on a grand scale". She spoke to her husband's friend Campbell who was the then president of Discovery Health Channel.

Oz takes part in speaking engagements across the United States and the world on the subject of well-being and relationships. In 2011–2012, she collaborated with former Natural Law Party candidate Jeffrey M. Smith in narrating the documentary film Genetic Roulette—The Gamble of Our Lives asserting health risks from GMO foods used in support of a California ballot initiative in favor of GMO labeling.

== Personal life ==
She married Mehmet Oz on June 29, 1985, in Bryn Athyn, Pennsylvania. According to The New York Times, Lisa Oz's mother "believed fervently in New Age approaches like homeopathic remedies and meditation", and introduced her husband to "alternative medicine and Eastern mysticism" which he now integrates into his advice programs. They have four children: Daphne Oz, filmmaker Arabella Oz, and Zoe; and son Oliver.

== See also ==
- New Yorkers in journalism
