= Einat Admony =

Israeli chef, restaurateur and comedian

Einat Admony עינת אדמוני
- Born: May 19, 1971 (age 55); Israel
- Spouse: Stefan Nafziger
- Children: 2
- Culinary career
- Ratings
- Michelin stars; AAA Motor Club; Mobil; Good Food Guide
- Current restaurants
- Balaboosta (2010-present); Moondog HiFI (2024-present)
- Television show
- Chopped

Einat Admony (Hebrew: עינת אדמוני; born 1971) is an Israeli-American chef, restaurateur, author and television personality. Born in Israel to a family of Iraqi, Iranian, and Yemenite Jewish descent, Admony grew up in Bnei Brak. She served in the Israel Defense Forces as a driver and cook before leaving Israel for four years traveling through Europe. She then returned to Israel for culinary school. She came to the US in 1999.

Admony has opened several restaurants in the United States, including Balaboosta in New York City and the Taim franchise. She has appeared on the Food Network's reality show Chopped as both a contestant and a judge. In 2019, Admony began performing comedy at the Comedy Cellar in New York.

== Early life ==
Admony was born in Israel on May 19, 1971, and was raised in the city of Bnei Brak. She is of Iraqi, Iranian, and Yemenite Jewish descent. She served in the IDF as a driver and cook.

== Career ==
Admony was one of the first chefs to introduce Israeli cuisine to Americans. She has opened 13 restaurants throughout her career. Currently she operates her flagship New York eatery, Balaboosta, which opened in 2010, and listening bar Moondog HiFi, which opened in 2024. The Taim franchise, with 15 locations across the U.S., was founded by Einat in 2005 and later expanded by an investment from Chipotle, the Mexican fast-food chain.

She appeared on the Food Network’s reality television show Chopped three times and won twice. Admony returned as a judge on the show. Host Ted Allen lists Admony as one of the four most memorable women to compete on the show.

In 2019, Admony took comedy lessons and began performing at the Comedy Cellar in New York. She is a contributor to Epicurious.

In 2022, Admony competed in Season 3 of Guy Fieri's Tournament of Champions.

She has published three books, including two cookbooks and one e-book: Shuk: From Market to Table, the Heart of Israeli Home Cooking, Balaboosta: Bold Mediterranean Recipes to Feed the People You Love, and Taste of Love.

She is the host of Nine Chefs, One Table, an annual event at her home in upstate NY to raise money for the James Beard Foundation.

"Admony shares her bold flavors with customers across the country through the meal delivery platform CookUnity".

== Awards and recognition ==
She was selected by Time Out New York as one of “ten women who make NY a better place,” and as a “2020 Rising Female Chef.”

In 2014 she was named a Great Immigrant by the Carnegie Corporation of New York. Also in 2014, her Bar Bolonat restaurant in the West Village was named “Best New Restaurant” by the New York Times.

In 2020 and 2022 she was a semifinalist for the James Beard Awards, in the Best Chef New York State category.

== Bibliography ==
- with Janna Gur. Shuk: From Market to Table, the Heart of Israeli Home Cooking. New York: Artisan (2019). ISBN 1579656722
- Balaboosta. New York: Artisan (2013). ISBN 1579655009

== Personal ==
She is married to Stefan Nafziger, who is also her business partner. They have two children and a dog named Bamba. The family lives in Brooklyn.
