= Janna Gur =

Israeli food writer, editor, translator and cook book author

- ז'אנה גור
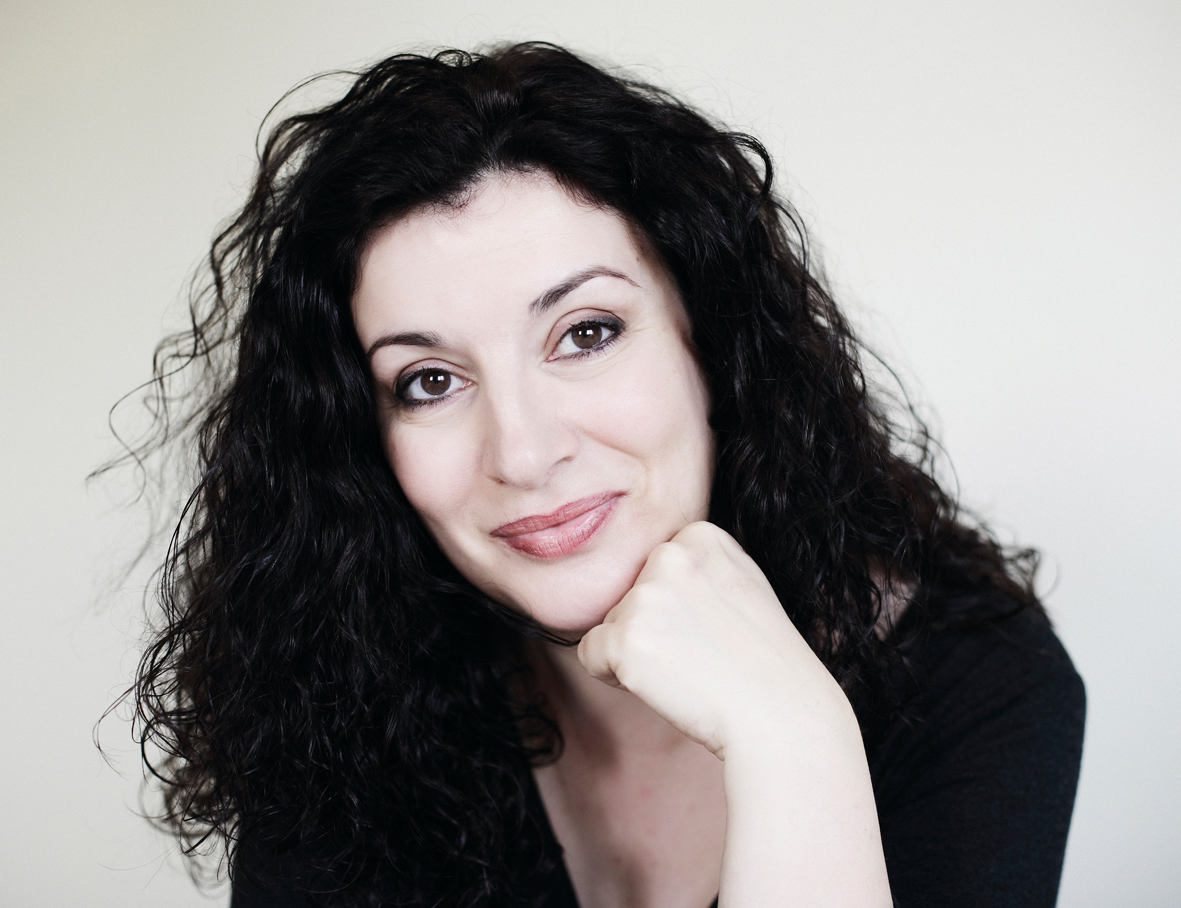
- Janna Gur
- Born: Riga, Latvia
- Education: Hebrew University; Tel Aviv University

Janna Gur (Hebrew: ז'אנה גור) is an Israeli food writer, editor, translator and cook book author and an expert on Israeli and Jewish cuisine. She was the chief editor and the publisher along with her husband Ilan Gur of "Al Hashulchan" culinary magazine for 27 years.

== Biography ==
The only child of mathematician and a medical doctor, Gur was born in the Latvian capital Riga in the then Soviet Union and immigrated to Israel in 1974. Upon reaching army age she joined the IDF's academic corps and studied English literature at the Hebrew University. She did her military service as an Officer in the Israeli Navy, where she taught technical English to future naval officers. Gur went on to MA studies in literary translation at Tel Aviv University while working as an El Al flight attendant to help finance her studies. The work with EL Al gave her the opportunity to travel and world sparked early interest in gastronomy.

She translated into Hebrew, from Russian, Mikhail Bulgakov's satire Heart of a Dog and from English, Yael Dayan's biography of Moshe Dayan My Father, His Daughter. She thought that she had found her vocation as a literary translator but then she met her husband, Ilan Gur, a journalist and an independent publisher, who introduced her to the world of magazine publishing. In 1991, one month before the Gulf War, the couple launched Al Hashulchan, with Janna Gur as the chief editor. The last decade of the 20th century was the formative one for the local food revolution and the interest in gastronomy was immense. originally conceived as a trade journal for chefs and restaurateurs, developed a following among local foodies and in time evolved into a popular general interest food and wine magazine, considered the premier culinary Hebrew speaking magazine widely ready by amateurs and professionals alike. The magazine closed in the fall of 2017 after 27 years and 387 issues.

In 2001, Al Hashulchan Media Group was established – as a specialized cook book publishing house. Janna Gur, as the chief editor, was involved in editing of over 40 Hebrew cookbooks, among them Sheshet – "The Kitchen Helper" series, which offered innovative approach to understanding recipes and cooking techniques. Nira Russo, a famous Israeli food writer, wrote about the first book in the series: "if you have a budget for just one cookbook, a definitive one, this is the book you should get." In 2002, Gur hosted a regular food segment on Channel 1 "Good Morning Israel" show. She continues to frequently appear on TV and radio, talking about food and wine and local culinary culture.

== The Book of New Israeli Food ==
"The Book New Israeli Food" was the first Janna Gur authored. Published by Al Hashulchan in 2007 and one year later by Shocken Division of the Random House Publishing house. It was shortlisted for the "Jewish Book Council Awards" in 2009, and chosen as one of the 25 best cookbooks for 2009 by "Food & Wine Magazine". At once a coffee-table book to browse and a complete cookbook, the book features over 200 recipes, an historic introduction and background stories on various aspects of local gastronomy, such as olive oil, wine, local markets, grill etc.

The German version of the book was published in 2007 by Umschau Verlag.

Since the book was published, Gur has been touring and lecturing about Israeli and Jewish Food, and is involved in various media projects promoting Israeli gastronomy.

== Jewish Soul Food from Minsk to Marrakesh ==
Janna Gur's second book, published in 2014 by Shocken is part of her ongoing project to preserve Jewish ethnic cuisines. Based on the premise that the only way to keep a cuisine alive is to cook the food, Gur created a collection of 100 dishes from various Jewish communities, worth preserving for their taste and practicality and suited to a contemporary kitchen.

In 2015 a Dutch translation of the book was published by Terra Publishing House.

== Shuk – the Heart of Israeli Home Cooking ==
Gur's latest book which she co-authored with the Israeli-American chef Einat Admony (chef of Taïm and Balabousta restaurants) was released in September 2019. The book, that features 140 Israeli recipes, along with background stories on local food markets (shuks), key ingredients, seasonality and cooking techniques, has been named as one of the 10 Top Cookbooks for the Fall of 2019 by Publishers Weekly and was awarded a starred review.
