= The Dr. Oz Show =

American daytime television talk show (2009–2022)

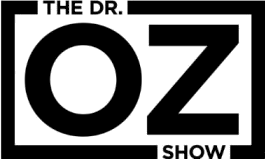
- Genre: Talk show
- Created by: Oprah Winfrey
- Directed by: Scot Titelbaum
- Presented by: Mehmet Oz
- Country of origin: United States
- Original language: English
- No. of seasons: 13
- No. of episodes: 2,209

Production
- Executive producers: Amy Chiaro; Stacy Rader (Note: credited as co-executive producer)
- Producer: Mehmet Oz (Note: credited as supervising producer)
- Camera setup: Multiple
- Running time: 42–44 minutes
- Production companies: Sony Pictures Television (entire run) ZoCo Productions (2009–2010) (season 1); Harpo Productions (2009–2010) (season 1); Harpo Studios (2010–2017) (seasons 2–8); OzWorks LLC (2009–2017) (seasons 1–8); Oz Media (2017–2022) (seasons 9–13)

Original release
- Network: Syndication
- Release: September 14, 2009 – January 14, 2022

Related
- The Good Dish

The Dr. Oz Show (or simply Oz) is an American syndicated daytime television talk show, hosted by Mehmet Oz, that aired between September 14, 2009, and January 14, 2022. Each episode features segments on health, wellness, and medical information, sometimes including true crime stories and celebrity interviews. It was co-produced by Oprah Winfrey's Harpo Productions/Harpo Studios and OzWorks LLC/Oz Media in association with Sony Pictures Television.

The Dr. Oz Show received nine Daytime Emmy Awards during its run, five for Outstanding Informative Talk Show and four for Outstanding Informative Talk Show Host, as well as criticism for some of its subject matter.

After Oz's November 2021 announcement that he would run as a Republican for the U.S. Senate seat in Pennsylvania, the show ceased production and aired its final episode on Friday, January 14, 2022. A food-themed spin-off talk show, The Good Dish, filled the timeslot on most stations from January 17 through the end of the 2021–22 television season, with its final episode airing May 25, 2022.

== Series overview ==
Season	Episodes	Originally aired	
Season	Episodes	First aired	Last aired
1	166	September 14, 2009	May 31, 2010
2	179	September 7, 2010	June 13, 2011
3	176	September 12, 2011	June 8, 2012
4	175	September 10, 2012	July 29, 2013
5	175	September 9, 2013	August 25, 2014
6	177	September 8, 2014	June 23, 2015
7	181	September 14, 2015	July 27, 2016
8	180	September 12, 2016	July 26, 2017
9	177	September 18, 2017	July 25, 2018
10	175	September 17, 2018	July 26, 2019
11	185	September 16, 2019	July 24, 2020
12	175	September 14, 2020	July 21, 2021
13	88	September 13, 2021	January 14, 2022

== History ==
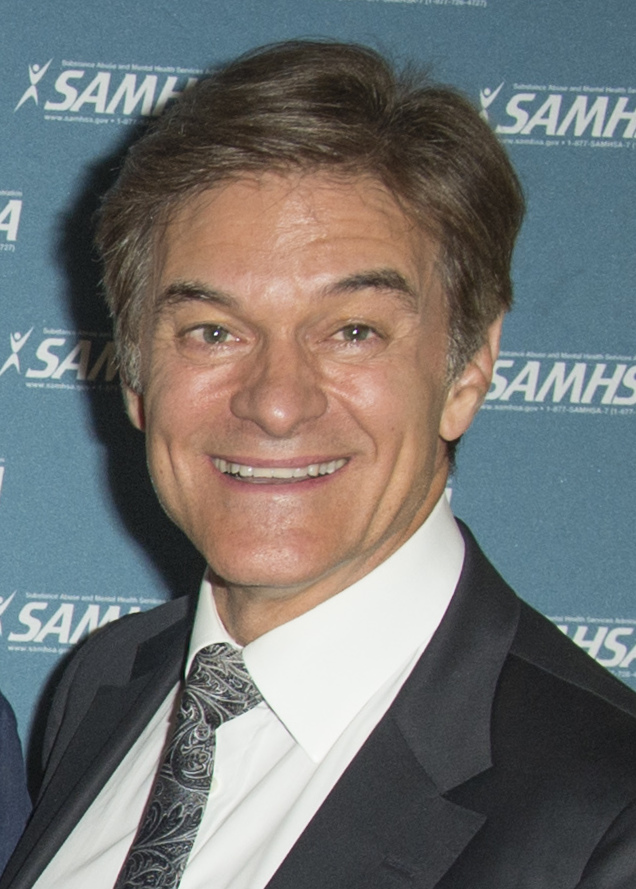
Host Dr. Mehmet Oz in 2016

Mehmet Oz appeared on The Oprah Winfrey Show 55 times over five years. In 2009, Winfrey offered to produce a syndicated series featuring Mehmet Oz through her company, Harpo Productions. The Dr. Oz Show debuted September 14, 2009. The first episode discussed the erogenous zones, unnecessary surgeries for women, and germs in purses. In 2010, the show received Daytime Emmy nominations for Outstanding Talk Show Informative and Outstanding Talk Show Informative Host, winning the latter.

For the first four seasons, shows were recorded in Studio 6A at NBC Studios in New York, but vacated Rockefeller Center after NBC reclaimed the space for its Late Night franchise. Beginning with season five, The Dr. Oz Show was recorded in the ABC Television Center East on the Upper West Side of Manhattan. The show moved to Studio 42 at the CBS Broadcast Center in the Hell's Kitchen neighborhood of Manhattan in 2020.

In April 2018, Sony Pictures Television renewed The Dr. Oz Show for seasons 11 and 12, taking it through 2020–21.

In March 2020, in-studio production was shut down after a staffer experienced "subtle" symptoms and tested positive for COVID-19. Episodes began filming at Oz's home afterward. The show announced that it would return to studio tapings for its season premiere on September 14, 2020, with limited crew members and without a live audience.

In September 2020, The Dr. Oz Show was renewed for a 13th and 14th season, which would have taken the show through 2023.

from January 5, 2021, until 2022, The show was available to stream on Pluto TV with 100 episodes and 30 episodes added each month rotating in.

=== Ending ===
Oz declared his candidacy on November 30, 2021, for the Republican primary for the U.S. Senate seat in Pennsylvania; this forced television stations in Pennsylvania and surrounding states and markets as far west as Cleveland, Ohio and Washington, D.C., to immediately drop the show from their schedule to remain in compliance with the equal-time rule. The show's website was also relocated to drozshow.com, as Oz personally owns the doctoroz.com domain, which was repurposed for his campaign website, along with the show's former logo being adapted for use in that campaign.

On December 13, 2021, Sony Pictures Television (SPT) confirmed that The Dr. Oz Show would air its final episode on Friday, January 14, 2022. The final program, which featured a discussion about shrinkflation and an interview with Maria Shriver, did not directly reference the show's end until the last segment, which was filmed in a different studio, in which Oz confirmed he was stepping aside due to his run for office, but expressed pride in how the series had, in his view, benefited viewers over its thirteen seasons.

=== The Good Dish ===
On Monday, January 17, 2022, most stations that aired Dr. Oz began filling the timeslot with a new SPT-distributed series titled The Good Dish, a food-themed talk show based on Oz's "The Dish" cooking segments, hosted by Mehmet Oz's daughter Daphne Oz, Gail Simmons, and Jamika Pessoa. Sony had originally announced the series in 2019 to air alongside Dr. Oz beginning in the fall of 2020; at the time, the show was set to be hosted by Simmons, Pessoa, Daphne Oz, and Vanessa Williams. Unable to sell it into syndication following the initial announcement, Sony revived the concept as a replacement for Dr. Oz for at least the remainder of the 2021–22 TV season. On March 9, less than two months after its launch, Deadline Hollywood reported The Good Dish would not be renewed in syndication beyond its initial partial season, with SPT exploring other cable or streaming outlets for the program. The Good Dish produced 87 episodes, finishing on May 25, 2022.

== Possible revival ==
Oz has expressed interest in reviving The Dr. Oz Show after losing Pennsylvania's senate race in November 2022. However, he has been unsuccessful in convincing his former producers to bring it back, citing his highly controversial views after entering politics and a massive ratings drop after Oz announced his run for office.

== Reception ==
According to a 2013 article in The New Yorker, the series was at that time "among the most highly rated daily television programs" in the United States. It consistently scores ratings with daytime television's primary demographic of women from ages 25–54. During the 2016 season, The Dr. Oz Show averaged a 1.4 Nielsen household rating in live-plus-same day numbers. It had a 1.2 Nielsen household rating in 2017 and a 1.1 rating during the 2018 season.

Over the course of its run, The Dr. Oz Show and other similar medical talk shows have been criticized for featuring subject matter that is not supported by published studies. The British Medical Journal found that more than half of the recommendations on these shows contradicted medical research. Producers for the show have stated that the series gives viewers "the most information and the greatest number of tools they can use to make their own choices."

== International versions ==
Country	Title	Network	Hosts	Date aired
Chile	Dr. TV	Mega	Claudio Aldunate	August 1, 2011 – 2012
Colombia	Doctor S.O.S.	RCN	Andrés Mejía (2012); Luis Felipe Mora (2012–2013)	February 6, 2012 – 2013
Indonesia	Dr. Oz Indonesia	Trans TV	Ryan Thamrin†, Reisa Broto Asmoro, Boy Abidin	April 27, 2013 – March 8, 2019
Peru	Dr. TV	América Televisión	Tomás Borda	March 26, 2012 – December 30, 2016
Brazil	E aí, Doutor?	RecordTV	Antônio Sproesser	May 23, 2011 – December 29, 2012
Russia	О самом главном O samom glavnom	Russia 1	Sergey Agapkin, Mikhail Politseymako, Alexander Myasnikov, Tatyana Shapovalenko	April 20, 2010 – March 14, 2022

== Awards and nominations ==
Year	Award	Category	Honorees	Result
2010	GLAAD Media Award	Outstanding Talk Show Episode	The Dr. Oz Show	Nominated
2010	Daytime Emmy Award	Outstanding Talk Show/Informative	The Dr. Oz Show	Nominated
2010	Daytime Emmy Award	Outstanding Informative Talk Show Host	Mehmet Oz	Won
2011	GLAAD Media Award	Outstanding Talk Show Episode	The Dr. Oz Show	Nominated
2011	Daytime Emmy Award	Outstanding Talk Show/Informative	The Dr. Oz Show	Won
2011	Daytime Emmy Award	Outstanding Informative Talk Show Host	Mehmet Oz	Won
2012	Daytime Emmy Award	Outstanding Talk Show/Informative	The Dr. Oz Show	Won
2012	Daytime Emmy Award	Outstanding Informative Talk Show Host	Mehmet Oz	Nominated
2013	Daytime Emmy Award	Outstanding Talk Show/Informative	The Dr. Oz Show	Won
2013	Daytime Emmy Award	Outstanding Informative Talk Show Host	Mehmet Oz	Nominated
2013	Daytime Emmy Award	Outstanding Live and Direct to Tape Sound Mixing	Bill Taylor, Glenn A. Arber	Nominated
2014	Daytime Emmy Award	Outstanding Talk Show/Informative	The Dr. Oz Show	Nominated
2014	Daytime Emmy Award	Outstanding Informative Talk Show Host	Mehmet Oz	Won
2014	Daytime Emmy Award	Outstanding Directing in a Talk Show/Entertainment News or Morning Program	Scot Titelbaum, Debra Mackrell	Won
2015	Daytime Emmy Award	Outstanding Informative Talk Show Host	Mehmet Oz	Nominated
2015	Daytime Emmy Award	Outstanding Technical Team	The Dr. Oz Show	Nominated
2015	Daytime Emmy Award	Outstanding Directing in a Talk Show/Entertainment News or Morning Program	Scot Titelbaum, Debra Mackrell	Nominated
2016	Daytime Emmy Award	Outstanding Informative Talk Show Host	Mehmet Oz	Won
2016	Daytime Emmy Award	Outstanding Directing in a Talk Show/Entertainment News or Morning Program	Scot Titelbaum, Debra Mackrell	Nominated
2016	Daytime Emmy Award	Outstanding Live and Direct to Tape Sound Mixing	Jorge Silva, Derek Vintschger	Nominated
2016	Daytime Emmy Award	Outstanding Technical Team	Steve Annenberg, Anthony Giannantonio, John Nugent, Lisa Rosenberg, Rob Salamanca, Zachary Spira-Bauer, Paul Wilken	Nominated
2016	Daytime Emmy Award	Outstanding Main Title and Graphic Design	Robin Bemporad, Jesse Cervantes, Paul Philipps, Raj Soni	Nominated
2016	Daytime Emmy Award	Outstanding Talk Show/Informative	The Dr. Oz Show	Nominated
2017	Daytime Emmy Award	Outstanding Talk Show/Informative	The Dr. Oz Show	Won
2017	Daytime Emmy Award	Outstanding Informative Talk Show Host	Mehmet Oz	Nominated
2017	Daytime Emmy Award	Outstanding Live and Direct to Tape Sound Mixing	Jorge Silva, Derek Vintschger	Nominated
2018	Daytime Emmy Award	Outstanding Talk Show/Informative	The Dr. Oz Show	Won
2018	Daytime Emmy Award	Outstanding Informative Talk Show Host	Mehmet Oz	Nominated
2019	Daytime Emmy Award	Outstanding Talk Show/Informative	The Dr. Oz Show	Nominated
2019	Daytime Emmy Award	Outstanding Informative Talk Show Host	Mehmet Oz	Nominated
