= Daphne Oz =

American television personality (born 1986)

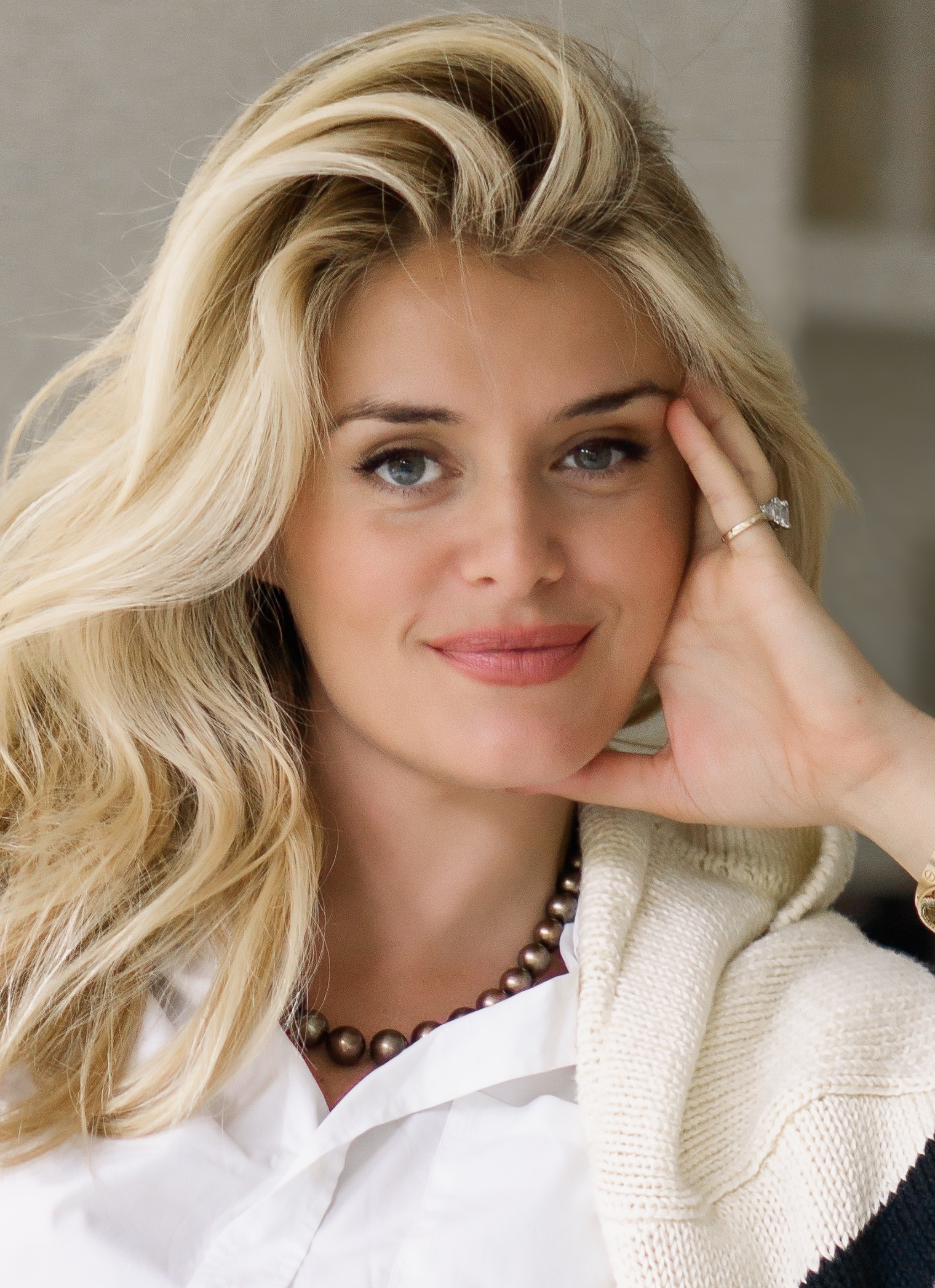
- Oz in 2021
- Born: Daphne Nur Oz; February 17, 1986 (age 40); Philadelphia, Pennsylvania, U.S.
- Education: Princeton University (BA)
- Occupations: Author; chef; journalist; TV personality
- Known for: The Chew (2011–2017); MasterChef Junior; The Good Dish
- Spouse: John Jovanovic (m. 2010)
- Children: 4
- Parents: Mehmet Oz (father); Lisa Oz (mother)
- Website: daphneoz.com

Daphne Nur Oz (Turkish: Öz; (Note: It is typically spelled with an O, instead of Ö) born February 17, 1986) is an American television host, food writer, and chef. She was one of five co-hosts on the ABC daytime talk show The Chew for the show's first six seasons and was a co-host of the syndicated talk/cooking show The Good Dish.

== Early life and education ==
Oz was born February 17, 1986, in Philadelphia, Pennsylvania. She is the eldest child of television personalities Mehmet Oz and Lisa Oz (née Lemole). Her paternal grandparents, Suna (née Atabay) and Mustafa Öz, emigrated from Konya Province, Turkey. She has three siblings.

Oz was raised in Cliffside Park, New Jersey, where she graduated from Dwight-Englewood School in 2004. Oz graduated with a degree in Near Eastern Studies from Princeton University in 2008. Oz is a graduate of the Institute for Integrative Nutrition and received a culinary degree from The Natural Gourmet Institute.

== Career ==
=== Author ===
Oz's first book, a National Bestseller, The Dorm Room Diet: The 10-Step Program for Creating A Healthy Lifestyle Plan That Really Works (Newmarket Press, 2006) details the tips and tricks she used to successfully navigate the unique “Danger Zones” of college life to create a healthy lifestyle and sustainably lose 40lbs. It advanced her approach to avoiding the "Freshman 15". The book also lends her advice on how to develop healthy habits while in college that may benefit the student through life. The book was publicized by multiple media outlets including The New York Times, The Wall Street Journal, People, The Washington Post, Reader's Digest, Teen Vogue, Cosmo Girl! and Seventeen. She has made promotional appearances on Good Morning America, Fox & Friends, The Nate Berkus Show, The Tyra Banks Show, NPR Weekend Edition, and her father's program, The Dr. Oz Show.

In 2007, she published The Dorm Room Diet Planner (Newmarket Press, 2007). In 2012, she collaborated with the rest of the cast of The Chew to author The Chew: Food. Life. Fun. Oz also is the author of the New York Times bestselling Relish: An Adventure in Food, Style, and Everyday Fun. Relish is part cookbook, part lifestyle guide where Oz shares her approach to curating a life filled with delicious joy and meaningful connection. This book offers essential advice for bringing passion and purpose to everyday food, style, and life (relationships, career, and playtime). The book contains recipes, tips, relationship and career advice, and the author's personal anecdotes. Oz has written articles for Glamour and The Huffington Post. In 2012, she wrote five articles for a column called "Food for Thought" for Creators Syndicate.

In 2016, Oz published a book called The Happy Cook: 125 Recipes for Eating Every Day Like It's the Weekend. The New York Times book review said: "the recipes are terrific — well designed and stress-free…and everything comes out as beautifully as she promises."

=== Public speaking ===
Oz speaks publicly on food, lifestyle, motherhood, and health topics. In 2008, she was invited to speak at The Governor's Women's Conference, hosted by Maria Shriver. Oz was a featured speaker at The Aspen Institute's 2009 Aspen Health Forum. In 2011, Oz and her mother Lisa were the featured speakers at WCBS Radio's Working Women's Luncheon. Oz has delivered addresses to campus audiences including Princeton University, University of Pennsylvania, Brown University, and Georgetown University. Oz appeared as a featured performer at both the South Beach Food & Wine and New York City Food & Wine Festivals.

=== Non-profit work ===
Oz is an ambassador for and helped to establish HealthCorps, a registered 501(c)(3) non-profit that equips teenagers with nutrition, exercise, and stress management education in over 50 schools nationwide. Oz also serves as a member of the board of Children's Board at Columbia and is the co-chair of the Junior Board for HealthCorps. She has supported the Food Bank 4 NYC and Dress for Success.

=== Television ===
Oz was one of five co-hosts on ABC's The Chew, a weekday one-hour lifestyle show, which premiered in September 2011. She has a Daytime Emmy Award to her credit, sharing the 2015 award for Outstanding Informative Talk Show Host with her Chew co-hosts. On August 11, 2017, it was confirmed that Oz would be leaving the show prior to the release of the seventh and final season.

After leaving The Chew, Oz has been featured as a guest co-host on The View, Beat Bobby Flay, and has appeared as a healthy living expert on Good Morning America, Fox & Friends, The Dr. Oz Show, The Rachael Ray Show, Dayside, and Good Day New York. She was also one of the celebrity guests on the game-show Celebrity Name Game.

She also appeared as a judge on the Food Network competition show Cooks vs. Cons. On July 17, 2019, it was announced that Oz would be joining Gordon Ramsay and Aarón Sanchez on the eighth season of MasterChef Junior, replacing previous judge Christina Tosi. She makes weekly appearances on The Dish and has appeared on ABC's The $100,000 Pyramid. In March 2020, Oz appeared on Today.

In late 2021, after Mehmet Oz announced his candidacy for the U.S. Senate in the 2022 midterm election, numerous TV stations pulled his show from the air, due to FCC laws about giving political candidates equal air time. On January 17, 2022 - as a replacement for the Dr. Oz show during his campaign - Sony (distributor for the Dr. Oz show) debuted a new spinoff show titled The Good Dish featuring Daphne Oz as host.

== Personal life ==
On August 26, 2010, Oz married John Jovanovic at the Municipal Marriage Bureau in Manhattan. Jovanovic is an investment fund analyst, whom Oz met in college. The civil ceremony was followed by two religious ceremonies on August 28, 2010, one at Serbian Saints Church in Portland, Maine, and one at the summer home of Oz's maternal grandparents led by Rev. Prescott Rogers of the Swedenborgian Church. They have four children.

== Selected works ==
- Relish: An Adventure in Food, Style, and Everyday Fun, 1st ed., New York: WilliamMorrow, 2013; ISBN 006219688X.
- The Dorm Room Diet: The 8-Step Program for Creating a Healthy Lifestyle Plan That Really Works, 1st ed., New York: Newmarket Press, 2006; ISBN 9781557046857.
- The Happy Cook: 125 Recipes For Eating Every Day Like It's The Weekend, 1st ed., New York: HarperCollins Publishers, 2016; ISBN 9780062426918.
