= List of Larry King Now episodes =

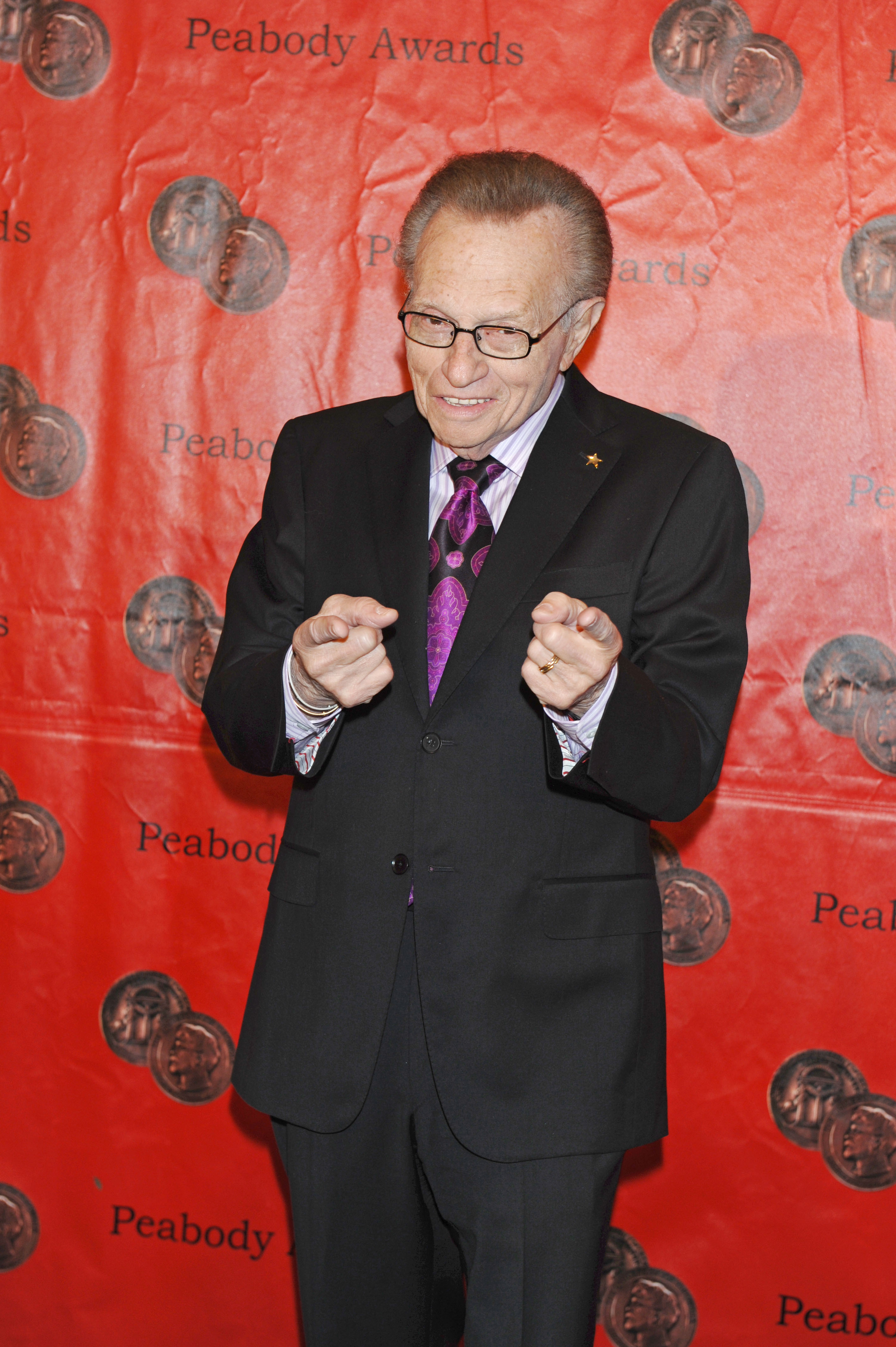
King in 2011

The following is a list of episodes of the American talk show web series Larry King Now hosted by Larry King. The series is available on Ora TV, Hulu and RT.

== Season 1 ==
Season 1
Episode	Air date	Guest/topic
1	July 17, 2012	Seth MacFarlane
2	July 18, 2012	Meghan McCain
3	July 19, 2012	Matthew McConaughey
4	July 23, 2012	Betty White
5	July 24, 2012	George Lopez
6	July 25, 2012	Oliver Stone
7	July 26, 2012	Will Forte
8	July 30, 2012	Judge Judy
9	July 31, 2012	Cast of Total Recall
10	August 1, 2012	Margaret Cho
11	August 2, 2012	Kevin Nealon and DeStorm Power
12	August 6, 2012	Cast of Dallas
13	August 7, 2012	Cedric the Entertainer and Niecy Nash
14	August 8, 2012	Susan Sarandon
15	August 9, 2012	The Huntsman Girls and Mystery Guitar Man
16	August 13, 2012	Aisha Tyler
17	August 14, 2012	Regis Philbin
18	August 15, 2012	Rudy Giuliani
19	August 16, 2012	Edward Norton
20	August 20, 2012	UFO's with James Fox, Tom DeLonge and Michael Shermer
21	August 21, 2012	Kristen Bell and Dax Shepard
22	August 22, 2012	Jeff Foxworthy
23	August 23, 2012	Baseball with Matt Kemp, David Wright, R. A. Dickey, Justin Turner, and Don Mattingly
24	August 27, 2012	Mike Rowe
25	August 28, 2012	Tom Arnold
26	August 29, 2012	Psychics with John Edward and Char Margolis
27	August 30, 2012	Nia Vardalos
28	September 3, 2012	Fran Drescher
29	September 4, 2012	Craig Ferguson
30	September 5, 2012	Jillian Michaels
31	September 6, 2012	Seth Green
32	September 10, 2012	Jeff Lewis
33	September 11, 2012	Chris Hardwick
34	September 12, 2012	Dr Drew
35	September 13, 2012	Bob Woodward (part 1)
36	September 17, 2012	Bob Woodward (part 2)
37	September 18, 2012	Rachael Ray
38	September 19, 2012	Jesse Ventura
39	September 20, 2012	Joan Rivers and Melissa Rivers
40	September 24, 2012	Eric Stonestreet
41	September 25, 2012	Kimora Lee Simmons
42	September 26, 2012	Penny Marshall
43	September 27, 2012	Bill Maher (part 1)
44	October 1, 2012	Bill Maher (part 2)
45	October 2, 2012	Nelly
46	October 3, 2012	Governor Gary Johnson (part 1)
47	October 4, 2012	Governor Gary Johnson (part 2)
48	October 8, 2012	Nick Cannon
49	October 9, 2012	Suzanne Somers
50	October 10, 2012	Cast of The Walking Dead: Andrew Lincoln and Sarah Wayne Callies
51	October 11, 2012	Megan Mullally
52	October 12, 2012	WWE Superstars John Cena, CM Punk, Big Show, The Miz and Zack Ryder
53	October 16, 2012	Deepak Chopra and Gotham Chopra
54	October 17, 2012	Lauren Conrad
55	October 18, 2012	Jenny McCarthy
56	October 22, 2012	Suze Orman, (part 1)
57	October 23, 2012	Suze Orman, (part 2)
58	October 24, 2012	Kevin Smith
59	October 25, 2012	Oscar Pistorius
60	October 29, 2012	Keith Olbermann (part 1)
61	October 30, 2012	Keith Olbermann (part 2)
62	October 31, 2012	Tim Allen
63	November 1, 2012	Lily Tomlin
64	November 2, 2012	Celebrity Politics with Omar Epps and Dean Cain
65	November 5, 2012	Amy Holmes and Marc Lamont Hill
66	November 6, 2012	Aasif Mandvi
67	November 7, 2012	Jeff Goldblum
68	November 8, 2012	Election 2012 Wrap up with Tanya Acker, Reed Dickens, Heidi Harris, and Eugene Jarecki
69	November 12, 2012	Jimmy Kimmel
70	November 13, 2012	Kate Walsh
71	November 14, 2012	Simon Baker
72	November 15, 2012	Miranda Cosgrove
73	November 16, 2012	Danica Patrick
74	November 26, 2012	Jake Tapper
75	November 27, 2012	Dave Salmoni
76	November 28, 2012	Wiz Khalifa
77	11/29/2012	Politics round-up Richard Grenell, Tanya Acker and Heidi Harris
78	12/03/2012	Tavis Smiley
79	12/04/2012	Shaun White
80	12/05/2012	Larry Flynt
81	12/06/2012	Trending Topics with Russell Peters, Rove McManus, and Natasha Leggero
82	12/07/2012	YouTube music stars Lindsey Stirling, David Choi, and Dave Days
83	12/10/2012	Howie Mandel
84	12/11/2012	Kevin Pollak
85	12/12/2012	Jeff Probst
86	12/13/2012	Martin Short
87	12/17/2012	Dr. Andrew Weil
88	12/18/2012	The League with Jeff Schaffer and Jackie Schaffer, Paul Scheer, Jon Lajoie and Antonio Gates
89	12/19/2012	Billy Crystal
90	12/20/2012	The Marijuana Debate
91	12/21/2012	A Very Larry Christmas
92	01/07/2013	Naomi Judd
93	01/08/2013	Kathy Griffin
94	01/09/2013	1600 Penn with Bill Pullman, Jenna Elfman and Josh Gad
95	01/10/2013	Chris Colfer
96	01/11/2013	Dr. Pam Peeke
97	01/14/2013	Lisa Lampanelli
98	01/15/2013	Dr. Eben Alexander
99	01/16/2013	Does Heaven Exist?
100	01/17/2013	100th Episode Celebration
101	01/21/2013	Pete Rose
102	01/22/2013	Why We Lie
103	01/23/2013	Healthy Body, Health Mind
104	01/24/2013	T.I. (Clifford Harris Jr.)
105	01/28/2013	Head Trauma in the NFL
106	01/29/2013	Rainn Wilson
107	01/30/2013	Patti Stanger
108	01/31/2013	Chad Johnson
109	02/04/2013	Gary Sinise
110	02/05/2013	Lisa Ling
111	02/06/2013	Jason Bateman and Melissa McCarthy
112	02/07/2013	Cast of The Walking Dead: Norman Reedus and Danai Gurira
113	02/11/2013	The Truth About Suicide
114	02/12/2013	James Van Der Beek
115	02/13/2013	Julie Andrews
116	02/14/2013	William Shatner
117	02/18/2013	Dita Von Teese
118	02/19/2013	Kelly Osbourne
119	02/20/2013	Cast of Gold Rush and Bering Sea Gold
120	02/21/2013	UFC with Dana White and Liz Carmouche
121	02/25/2013	Kelsey Grammer and Steven C. Barber
122	02/26/2013	Preventing Heart Disease
123	02/27/2013	Gavin Newsom
124	02/28/2013	Wayne Brady
125	03/04/2013	Arianna Huffington
126	03/05/2013	Jesse Tyler Ferguson
127	03/06/2013	Cast of Duck Dynasty
128	03/07/2013	Mario Lopez
129	03/18/2013	Ryan Seacrest
130	03/19/2013	Lior Suchard
131	03/20/2013	Harvey Mackay
132	03/21/2013	Jessica Alba
133	03/25/2013	Kevin Bacon
134	03/26/2013	Joel McHale
135	03/27/2013	Clive Davis
136	03/28/2013	Cast of The Walking Dead: David Morrissey and Laurie Holden
137	04/01/2013	Levar Burton and Bill Nye
138	04/02/2013	The Paranormal
139	04/03/2013	Arsenio Hall
140	04/04/2013	Dennis Quaid
141	04/08/2013	Trending Topics
142	04/09/2013	Brad Garrett
143	04/10/2013	Julie Chen
144	04/11/2013	Snoop Lion (Calvin Broadus)
145	04/15/2013	50 Cent (Curtis Jackson III)
146	04/16/2013	Kat Von D (Katherine Drachenberg)
147	04/17/2013	Carol Burnett
148	04/18/2013	Harrison Ford
149	04/22/2013	Quincy Jones and Michael Caine
150	04/23/2013	Stevie Wonder
151	04/24/2013	Criminal Justice
152	04/25/2013	Julia Louis-Dreyfus
153	04/29/2013	Billy Ray Cyrus
154	04/30/2013	Pierce Brosnan
155	05/01/2013	Floyd Mayweather
156	05/01/2013	A Tribute to Billy Graham
157	05/06/2013	Donald Faison
158	05/07/2013	Kal Penn
159	05/08/2013	Michael Chiklis
160	05/09/2013	Carlos Slim (part 1)
161	05/10/2013	Carlos Slim, (part 2)
162	05/13/2013	Tim McGraw
163	05/14/2013	Stephen Amell
164	05/15/2013	Aaron Eckhart
165	05/16/2013	John Cho
166	05/20/2013	Dan Aykroyd
167	05/21/2013	Donald Rumsfeld
168	05/22/2013	Norm Macdonald
169	05/23/2013	Cast of Men at Work
170	05/27/2013	Laura Ingraham
171	06/03/2013	Marilyn Manson
172	06/04/2013	Trending Topics
173	06/05/2013	NFL Rookies: Matt Barkley, Landry Jones and Justin Hunter
174	06/06/2013	NFL Rookies: Montee Ball, Eddie Lacy and Ryan Nassib
175	06/10/2013	Steve Austin
176	06/11/2013	Nick Offerman
177	06/12/2013	Brain Power: Sharpen Your Mind
178	06/13/2013	Joe Manganiello
179	06/17/2013	Fitness Facts vs. Myths
180	06/18/2013	Cast of Hot in Cleveland
181	06/19/2013	Cast of Franklin & Bash
182	06/20/2013	Trending Topics
183	06/24/2013	Nutrition and the Politics of Food
184	06/25/2013	Val Kilmer
185	06/26/2013	Rory Bushfield
186	06/27/2013	Greta Van Susteren
187	06/28/2013	Chris Kluwe

== Season 2 ==
Season 2
Episode	Air date	Guest/topic
1	07/15/2013	Jane Lynch
2	07/16/2013	Julian Lennon and Katherine Schwarzenegger
3	07/17/2013	Jeff Bridges
4	07/18/2013	Giuliana Rancic and Bill Rancic
5	07/22/2013	Patrick J. Adams and Meghan Markle
6	07/23/2013	Larry the Cable Guy
7	07/24/2013	Dwight "Doc" Gooden
8	07/25/2013	Nigel Lythgoe and Cat Deeley
9	07/29/2013	Cast of One Life to Live
10	07/30/2013	Lisa Kudrow
11	07/31/2013	Denzel Washington and Mark Wahlberg
12	08/01/2013	Paula Patton and Bill Paxton
13	08/05/2013	Hank Azaria
14	08/05/2013	Oprah Winfrey
15	08/07/2013	Sharon Stone
16	08/08/2013	Dane Cook
17	08/12/2013	Ashton Kutcher and Josh Gad
18	08/13/2013	Forest Whitaker and Lee Daniels
19	08/14/2013	Backstreet Boys
20	08/15/2013	WWE Divas
21	08/19/2013	Anna Gunn and Dean Norris
22	08/20/2013	The Jonas Brothers
23	08/21/2013	Hugh Laurie
24	08/22/2013	Tony Hale
25	08/26/2013	Happiness
26	08/27/2013	Curtis Stone
27	08/28/2013	Bill Hader
28	08/29/2013	Trends, Topics and Tags
29	09/09/2013	Adam Carolla
30	09/10/2013	Wendy Williams
31	09/11/2013	Maria Sharapova
32	09/12/2013	Meghan McCain
33	09/16/2013	Ron Howard
34	09/17/2013	Gary Allan
35	09/18/2013	Tim Gunn
36	09/19/2013	Celine Dion
37	09/23/2013	Alyssa Milano
38	09/24/2013	Post-traumatic Stress Disorder
39	09/25/2013	Cheryl Hines and Rachael Harris
40	09/26/2013	George Takei
41	09/30/2013	Gina Gershon
42	10/01/2013	Game
43	10/02/2013	Baseball's Hidden Treasures
44	10/03/2013	Gloria Estefan
45	10/07/2013	Michael Kenneth Williams & Michael Shannon
46	10/08/2013	Kendra Wilkinson
47	10/9/2013	Gayle King
48	10/10/2013	Neil deGrasse Tyson
49	10/14/2013	Daniel Radcliffe and Michael C. Hall
50	10/15/2013	Clark Gregg
51	10/16/2013	Chris Matthews
52	10/17/2013	Mike Tyson and Evander Holyfield
53	10/21/2013	Nelly
54	10/22/2013	Cast of The Walking Dead: Steven Yeun and Lauren Cohan
55	10/23/2013	Slash
56	10/24/2013	Jenna Jameson
57	10/28/2013	Tito Ortiz
58	10/29/2013	Quinton "Rampage" Jackson
59	10/30/2013	Eli Roth
60	10/31/2013	Rob Zombie
61	11/01/2013	Cast of Last Vegas
62	11/04/2013	Rich Eisen
63	11/05/2013	Rob Lowe
64	11/06/2013	Cher Lloyd
65	11/07/2013	Zachary Levi
66	11/11/2013	Marc Maron
67	11/12/2013	Jeff Garlin & Wendi McLendon-Covey
68	11/13/2013	James Caan
69	11/14/2013	Chris Jericho
70	11/18/2013	Terrence Howard
71	11/19/2013	Misha Collins
72	11/20/2013	Jason Derulo
73	11/21/2013	James Brolin
74	11/22/2013	The Kennedy Assassination: 50 Years Later
75	12/2/2013	Garth Brooks
76	12/3/2013	Emile Hirsch
77	12/4/2013	Randi Zuckerberg
78	12/5/2013	Judge Judy
79	12/6/2013	Alex Borstein & Chris D'Elia
80	12/9/2013	Theresa Caputo
81	12/10/2013	Anjelica Huston
82	12/11/2013	Adam Scott & Mike Birbiglia
83	12/12/2013	Jason Schwartzman
84	12/16/2013	Incarceration Nation
85	12/17/2013	Abigail Breslin
86	12/18/2013	Will Ferrell, David Koechner, Judd Apatow & Adam McKay
87	12/19/2013	Steve Carell, Paul Rudd, Christina Applegate, James Marsden, & Meagan Good
88	12/20/2013	Best of 2013
89	1/6/2014	Rob Delaney
90	1/7/2014	Haley Joel Osment
91	1/8/2014	Jerry Ferrara
92	1/9/2014	Allison Williams
93	1/13/2014	Joel Osteen
94	1/14/2014	Culinary innovators
95	1/15/2014	Kevin Pearce & Kevin Laue
96	1/16/2014	Rob Dyrdek
97	1/20/2014	Rethinking Alcoholism
98	1/21/2014	Vanessa Hudgens
99	1/22/2014	Tia & Tamera Mowry
100	1/23/2014	Sharon Osbourne
101	1/27/2014	Rick Hall
102	1/27/2014	Ice Cube
103	1/28/2014	Stan Lee
104	1/30/2014	Terry Crews
105	2/3/2014	Martina McBride & Buck Marshall
106	2/4/2014	Meat Loaf
107	2/5/2014	Criminal Minds
108	2/6/2014	Vernon Davis
109	2/10/2014	Jerry Springer
110	2/11/2014	Seth Green
111	2/12/2014	Jack Osbourne
112	2/13/2014	GMO Panel, Part 1
113	2/17/2014	GMO Panel, Part 2
114	2/18/2014	John Cena
115	2/19/2014	Pete Wentz
116	2/20/2014	Trends, Tags & Topics
117	2/24/2014	Workaholics
118	2/25/2014	Dierks Bentley
119	2/26/2014	Steve Grand
120	2/27/2014	Tony Hawk
121	3/10/2014	Dalai Lama
122	3/11/2014	Cesar Millan
123	3/12/2014	Dr. Patrick Soon-Shiong
124	3/13/2014	Akon
125	3/17/2014	Allison Janney & Anna Faris
126	3/18/2014	Andy Garcia
127	3/19/2014	Russell Simmons
128	3/20/2014	O'Bannon vs. NCAA: The Payment of College Athletes
129	3/21/2014	Omar Epps
130	3/24/2014	George Lopez
131	3/25/2014	Dominic Monaghan
132	3/26/2014	The Cast of "Enlisted"
133	3/27/2014	Mekhi Phifer
134	3/31/2014	Robert Wagner
135	4/1/2014	Jimmie Johnson
136	4/2/2014	Fred Armisen & Carrie Brownstein
137	4/3/2014	Danny Pudi
138	4/7/2014	Willie Nelson
139	4/8/2014	Bob Saget
140	4/9/2014	Jeff Gordon
141	4/10/2014	Jason Alexander
142	4/14/2014	Kurt Sutter & Carlton Cuse
143	4/15/2014	Bill Lawrence & Liz Meriwether
144	4/16/2014	Jonathan Nolan, Greg Plageman, & Graeme Manson
145	4/17/2014	Julie Plec and Scott M. Gimple
146	4/21/2014	Karmin
147	4/22/2014	Betty White
148	4/23/2014	William Shatner
149	4/24/2014	Captains Johnathan Hillstrand & Wild Bill Wichrowski
150	4/28/2014	Brooklyn Decker
151	4/29/2014	Rediscovering the Fountain of Youth
152	4/30/2014	Pusha T
153	5/1/2014	Ian Somerhalder
154	5/5/2014	Mark Harmon
155	5/6/2014	Mayim Bialik & Melissa Rauch
156	5/7/2014	Brain Fitness
157	5/8/2014	Morgan Spurlock
158	5/12/2014	Dr. Oz
159	5/13/2014	Andy Cohen
160	5/14/2014	The Cast of "Playing House"
161	5/15/2014	The Cast of "Silicon Valley"
162	5/19/2014	David Alan Grier
163	5/20/2014	Bishop T.D. Jakes
164	5/21/2014	Wil Wheaton
165	5/22/2014	Sutton Foster & Andy Karl
166	6/2/2014	The N-word
167	6/3/2014	Chris Hardwick
168	6/4/2014	Tyler, the Creator
169	6/5/2014	Boyz II Men
170	6/9/2014	Rick Fox
171	6/10/2014	Simon Helberg
172	6/11/2014	The Cast of "Undateable"
173	6/12/2014	Lance Bass
174	6/16/2014	Kato Kaelin
175	6/17/2014	Terry Bradshaw
176	6/18/2014	3D Printing
177	6/19/2014	Trey Songz
178	6/23/2014	The Cast of "Girl Meets World"
179	6/24/2014	Troian Bellisario
180	6/25/2014	Tony Goldwyn
181	6/26/2014	Linda Perry

== Season 3 ==
Season 3
Episode	Air date	Guest/topic
1	07/21/2014	Anna Paquin
2	07/22/2014	Chrissy Teigen
3	07/23/2014	Albert Pujols
4	07/24/2014	Craig Ferguson
5	07/28/2014	Don Rickles
6	07/29/2014	"Weird Al" Yankovic
7	07/30/2014	Metta World Peace
8	07/31/2014	Judy Greer and Nat Faxon
9	08/4/2014	DJ Khaled
10	08/5/2014	Henrik Lundqvist
11	08/6/2014	Russell Peters
12	08/7/2014	Randy Couture
13	08/11/2014	Priscilla Presley
14	08/12/2014	William H. Macy
15	08/13/2014	Billy Bob Thornton
16	08/14/2014	Common
17	08/18/2014	David Arquette
18	08/19/2014	Jake Owen
19	08/20/2014	The State of Faith in America
20	08/21/2014	The Band Perry
21	08/25/2014	Joe Manganiello
22	08/26/2014	So You Think You Can Dance
23	08/27/2014	Dash Mihok & Pooch Hall with guest host Rick Fox
24	08/28/2014	Jim Brown
25	09/2/2014	Jason Mraz
26	09/3/2014	Ray Liotta
27	09/4/2014	Ellen Burstyn
28	09/8/2014	Nev Schulman
29	09/9/2014	Remembering Joan Rivers
30	09/10/2014	Mel B
31	09/11/2014	Nick Carter & Lauren Kitt Carter
32	09/15/2014	Kathy Griffin
33	09/17/2014	Jerry Springer & Steve Wilkos
34	09/18/2014	Domestic Violence and the NFL
35	09/22/2014	Michelle Monaghan
36	09/23/2014	Michael Waltrip
37	09/24/2014	The Judges of "Hot Bench"
38	09/25/2014	Luke Wilson
39	09/29/2014	Tig Notaro
40	09/30/2014	Steve Aoki
41	10/1/2014	Tracee Ellis Ross with guest host Janet Mock
42	10/2/2014	Alton Brown
43	10/6/2014	Big & Rich
44	10/7/2014	Dax Shepard with guest host Tom Arnold
45	10/8/2014	Sonequa Martin-Green, Chad L. Coleman, & Michael Cudlitz
46	10/9/2014	Jeremy Renner
47	10/13/2014	Rosie Perez
48	10/14/2014	Pauley Perrette
49	10/15/2014	Ebola in America
50	10/16/2014	Melissa Etheridge
51	10/20/2014	Annie Lennox
52	10/21/2014	T.I.
53	10/22/2014	Flea
54	10/23/2014	Corey Taylor
55	10/27/2014	Alan Cumming
56	10/28/2014	Joe Perry
57	10/29/2014	Norman Lear
58	10/30/2014	Jon Cryer
59	10/31/2014	Evaluating Higher Education in America
60	11/3/2014	Matthew McConaughey
61	11/4/2014	Flo Rida
62	11/5/2014	Shirley MacLaine
63	11/6/2014	Rob Riggle
64	11/10/2014	Deion Sanders
65	11/11/2014	Miles "Baby Boogaloo" Brown & Flynn McGarry
66	11/12/2014	David Hyde Pierce
67	11/13/2014	Dick Cavett
68	11/7/2014	Theo Rossi & Kim Coates
69	11/18/2014	Being Transgender in America
70	11/19/2014	Andy Richter
71	11/20/2014	Hilary Swank
72	11/24/2014	Sophia Loren
73	11/25/2014	Brooke Shields
74	11/26/2014	Kristin Chenoweth
75	12/1/2014	Chris Hardwick with guest host Wil Wheaton
76	12/2/2014	T-Pain
77	12/3/2014	Jay Bakker
78	12/4/2014	Carlos Santana
79	12/8/2014	Nathan Fillion
80	12/9/2014	Emmy Rossum
81	12/10/2014	David Boreanaz
82	12/11/2014	Will.I.Am
83	12/15/2014	Willie Robertson
84	12/16/2014	Jack Antonoff
85	12/17/2014	Christianity Today
86	12/18/2014	Tony Robbins
87	01/12/2015	Alison Sweeney
88	01/14/2015	Rivers Cuomo
89	01/16/2015	Millennials & Marriage
90	01/19/2015	Marion Cotillard
91	01/21/2015	Patrick Stewart
92	01/23/2015	H. Jon Benjamin, Aisha Tyler, & Judy Greer
93	01/26/2015	Matt Kemp
94	01/28/2015	Kid Ink
95	01/30/2015	Ashley Judd
96	02/2/2015	Michael Ian Black
97	02/4/2015	James Franco & Justin Kelly
98	02/6/2015	Jake "The Snake" Roberts, Scott Hall, & Diamond Dallas Page
99	02/9/2015	Adrian Grenier
100	02/11/2015	Patricia Arquette
101	02/13/2015	Toni Collette & Gerard Barrett
102	02/16/2015	"Prophets Prey" Creators
103	02/18/2015	Mike Epps
104	02/20/2015	Charlamagne Tha God
105	02/23/2015	Al Roker
106	02/25/2015	Big Sean
107	02/27/2015	Kevin Nealon
108	03/2/2015	Marvel's Agents of S.H.I.E.L.D.
109	03/4/2015	Eddie Izzard
110	03/6/2015	Hooked: Americas Prescription Drug Crisis
111	03/9/2015	Michael Emerson
112	03/11/2015	Johnny Galecki
113	03/13/2015	Steel Panther
114	03/16/2015	Rumer Willis
115	03/18/2015	Shad "Bow Wow" Moss
116	03/20/2015	Ryan Phillippe
117	03/23/2015	Dating in the Digital Age
118	03/25/2015	Lindsey Buckingham
119	03/27/2015	Talib Kweli
120	03/30/2015	ADHD in America
121	04/1/2015	America's Battle Over Gun Control
122	04/3/2015	Ludacris
123	04/6/2015	Wale
124	04/8/2015	Boy George
125	04/10/2015	Interstellar: NASA's Search for Life
126	04/13/2015	Bethenny Frankel
127	04/15/2015	Matthew Weiner
128	04/17/2015	Russell Crowe
129	04/27/2015	Cat Deeley
130	04/29/2015	David Guetta
131	05/1/2015	George Foreman
132	05/4/2015	Josh Gad
133	05/6/2015	Brad Garrett
134	05/8/2015	Angie Martinez
135	05/11/2015	Anna Camp and Brittany Snow
136	05/13/2015	Ethan Hawke
137	05/15/2015	La La Anthony
138	05/18/2015	Meredith Vieira
139	05/20/2015	Melissa Rivers
140	05/22/2015	Marlon Wayans
141	06/1/2015	Ronda Rousey
142	06/3/2015	Elizabeth Banks
143	06/5/2015	Robert Duvall
144	06/8/2015	Orthorexia
145	06/10/2015	Brian Grazer
146	06/11/2015	Bill Paxton
147	06/15/2015	Neil DeGrasse Tyson
148	06/17/2015	Elijah Wood
149	06/22/2015	Amber Rose
150	06/24/2015	Kathy Bates
151	06/26/2015	Darius Rucker

== Season 4 ==
Season 4
Episode	Air date	Guest/topic
1	7/27/2015	50 Cent
2	7/29/2015	Elizabeth Gini
3	7/31/2015	Jenna Marbles
4	8/3/2015	Norm Macdonald
5	8/5/2015	Jim Gaffigan
6	8/7/2015	Jermaine Dupri
7	8/10/2015	Jane Lynch
8	8/12/2015	Jake Johnson
9	8/13/2015	Beau Bridges
10	8/17/2015	Tony Hale
11	8/19/2015	Morrissey
12	8/21/2015	Connie Britton
13	8/24/2015	Scooter Braun
14	8/26/2015	Wes Bentley
15	8/28/2015	Robert Redford and Nick Nolte
16	8/31/2015	Scott Kelly
17	9/2/2015	Stan Lee
18	9/4/2015	The State of Faith in America Part 2
19	9/7/2015	Lisa Leslie
20	9/9/2015	Mac Miller
21	9/11/2015	Mira Sorvino & Monica Ord
22	9/14/2015	Michael Shannon
23	9/16/2015	Rob Huebel
24	9/18/2015	Emily Mortimer
25	9/21/2015	Beverly Johnson
26	9/26/2015	Kaskade
27	9/27/2015	Marg Helgenberger
28	9/28/2015	Peter Capaldi
29	9/30/2015	Derek Waters
30	10/2/2015	Andrew WK
31	10/5/2015	John Fogerty
32	10/7/2015	Eli Roth
33	10/9/2015	The State of HIV/AIDS in America
34	10/12/2015	Drew Carey
35	10/14/2015	Amber Rose
36	10/16/2015	Kelly Carlin
37	10/19/2015	Rob Thomas
38	10/21/2015	Danny Boyle
39	10/23/2015	Dick Van Dyke
40	10/26/2015	Travis Barker
41	10/28/2015	Kathy Griffin
42	10/30/2015	Wes Craven Tribute
43	11/2/2015	Hozier with guest host Kelly Osbourne
44	11/4/2015	Examining Sleep Health in America
45	11/6/2015	Michael Connelly
46	11/9/2015	Seal
47	11/11/2015	Paul Bettany
48	11/13/2015	Mary Berry & Mary McCartney
49	11/16/2015	Kellie Pickler
50	11/18/2015	Elizabeth Hurley
52	11/23/2015	Budd Moss
53	11/30/2015	Nick Frost
54	12/2/2015	Ian McKellan
55	12/4/2015	Spike Lee
56	12/7/2015	Tracee Ellis Ross
57	12/9/2015	Tom Jones
58	12/11/2015	Joseph Simmons and Wife Justine
59	12/14/2015	Joanna Newsom
60	12/16/2015	Vine Show
61	12/17/2015	Han Cholo
62	1/6/2016	William H. Macy
63	1/8/2016	Dolvett Quince and Jennifer Widerstrom
64	1/11/2016	Jillian Bell and Charlotte Newhouse
65	1/13/2016	Sean Bean
66	1/15/2016	Gillian Anderson
67	1/18/2016	Jillian Michaels
68	1/20/2016	Daymond John
69	1/22/2016	Whitney Cummings
70	1/25/2016	Hannah Hart
71	1/27/2016	Charlie Puth and Troye Sivan
72	1/29/2016	Carol Burnett
73	2/1/2016	Tyler Posey
74	2/3/2016	Grace Helbig
75	2/5/2016	Joy Behar
76	2/8/2016	Courtney B. Vance
77	2/10/2016	Michael McKean
78	2/12/2016	Wendy Williams
79	2/15/2016	Cuba Gooding Jr.
80	2/17/2016	Stephan James and Eugene Cernan
82	2/22/2016	Malin Akerman
83	2/24/2016	Craig Ferguson
84	2/26/2016	Drs. John Ratey & Michael Merzenich
85	2/29/2016	Morgan Freeman
86	3/2/2016	Angela Bassett
87	3/4/2016	Donna Karan
88	3/14/2016	French Montana
89	3/16/2016	Dan Levy & Rosie Rivera
90	3/18/2016	Steve-O
91	3/21/2016	LA Reid
92	3/23/2016	Social Media Panel
93	3/25/2016	Marcia Clarke & Kato Kaelin
94	3/28/2016	Tyrese
95	3/30/2016	Dr. Lucy on earthquakes
96	4/1/2016	G-Eazy
97	4/4/2016	Sarah Paulson
98	4/6/2016	Sam Rockwell
99	4/8/2016	Nina Tassler
100	4/11/2016	John Cena
101	4/13/2016	Ben Kingsley
102	4/15/2016	Kevin Costner & Gary Oldman
103	4/18/2016	Eve
104	4/20/2016	Andrew Dice Clay
105	4/22/2016	Gary Vaynerchuk
106	4/25/2016	Stephen Fry
107	4/27/2016	Garry Marshall
108	4/29/2016	Nia Long
109	5/2/2016	Charo
110	5/4/2016	Colin Cowherd
111	5/6/2016	Susan Sarandon
112	5/9/2016	The Chainsmokers
113	5/11/2016	Spiritual Healing: Myth or Reality?
114	5/13/2016	Wendi Mclendon-Covey
115	5/16/2016	Moby
116	5/18/2016	Jay Roach
117	5/20/2016	Saul Williams & Charles Bradley
118	5/23/2016	Kate Beckinsale
119	5/25/2016	Anthony Hopkins
120	5/27/2016	Stephen Amell
121	6/1/2016	Nely Galan
122	6/3/2016	William Shatner
123	6/6/2016	Gillian Jacobs
124	6/8/2016	Robert Herjavec
125	6/10/2016	Timothy Simons & Sam Richardson
126	6/13/2016	Matt Walsh
127	6/15/2016	Tim Tebow
128	6/17/2016	Diane Warren
129	6/20/2016	Dan Rather
130	6/22/2016	Vivica A. Fox & Judd Hirsch
131	6/24/2016	NeNe Leak
132	6/25/2016	Stephen Hawking
133	6/27/2016	Jill Karman & Abby Elliott
134	6/29/2016	Bobbi Kristina Brown
135	7/1/2016	Barbara Corcoran
136	7/4/2016	NASA's Jet Propulsion Laboratory
137	7/6/2016	Tom Colicchio
138	7/8/2016	Bryan Cranston
139	7/11/2016	Dan Harmon
140	7/15/2016	Erin and Sarah Foster

== Season 5 ==
Season 5
Episode	Air date	Guest/topic
1	7/25/2016	Sheila E.
2	7/27/2016	Lenny Dykstra
3	7/29/2016	Malcolm Gladwell
4	8/1/2016	Nick Cannon
5	8/3/2016	Jason Biggs
6	8/5/2016	Eric Andre
7	8/8/2016	Constance Zimmer & Shiri Appleby
8	8/10/2016	Keegan-Michael Key
9	8/12/2016	Brandi Chastain
10	8/15/2016	Jack Osbourne
11	8/17/2016	Jeff Bridges
12	8/19/2016	Simon Helberg
13	8/22/2016	Julie Chen
14	8/24/2016	Dolly Parton
15	8/26/2016	John Krasinski
16	8/29/2016	Felicity Huffman
17	8/31/2016	Natasha Lyonne
18	9/2/2016	Angela Duckworth
19	9/5/2016	Jason Priestley
20	9/7/2016	Shawn Mendes
21	9/9/2016	Vanna White
22	9/12/2016	Brothers Osborne
23	9/14/2016	Wynonna Judd
24	9/16/2016	Scott Borchetta
25	9/19/2016	Chris Noth
26	9/21/2016	Kute Blackson & A. R. Bernard
27	9/23/2016	Kristen Schaal
28	9/26/2016	Kevin O'Leary
29	9/28/2016	Zac Posen
30	9/30/2016	James Marsden
31	10/3/2016	Jewel
32	10/5/2016	Dan Bilzerian
33	10/7/2016	Kathryn Hahn
34	10/10/2016	Lance Bass
35	10/12/2016	James Patterson
36	10/14/2016	Rebecca Hall & Bruce Campbell
37	10/17/2016	Norm Macdonald
38	10/19/2016	Michael Chiklis
39	10/21/2016	Tegan and Sara
40	10/24/2016	Lew Dickey
41	10/26/2016	Chris Kattan
42	10/28/2016	Cassandra 'Elvira' Peterson
43	10/31/2016	Iliza Shlesinger
44	11/2/2016	Sergey "Krusher" Kovalev
45	11/4/2016	Kathy Griffin
46	11/7/2016	Kunal Nayyar
47	11/9/2016	Dee Snider
48	11/11/2016	J. B. Smoove
49	11/14/2016	Jeezy
50	11/16/2016	Ana Gasteyer
51	11/18/2016	Diana Nyad
52	11/21/2016	Thomas Lennon & David Lebedoff
53	11/23/2016	Nicole Scherzinger
54	11/25/2016	Innocence Project
55	11/28/2016	Tippi Hedren
56	11/30/2016	Jeremy Irons
57	12/2/2016	Tony Hawk
58	12/5/2016	Bret Easton Ellis
59	12/7/2016	Carole Bayer Sager
60	12/9/2016	Roger Love
61	12/12/2016	Shemar Moore
62	12/14/2016	Ben Mendelsohn
63	12/16/2016	Leah Remini
64	1/2/2017	Carrie Keagan
65	1/4/2017	Adam Driver
66	1/6/2017	Kandi Burruss
67	1/9/2017	Ruth Negga
68	1/11/2017	Lee Daniels
69	1/13/2017	Yvette Nicole Brown
70	1/16/2017	Finding Happiness
71	1/18/2017	Curtis Stone
72	1/20/2017	Gary Cole
73	1/23/2017	Christina Ricci
74	1/25/2017	Rick Astley & Eddie Money
75	1/27/2017	Maura Tierney
76	1/30/2017	Brandi Glanville
77	2/1/2017	Keke Palmer
78	2/3/2017	Mackenzie Phillips
79	2/6/2017	Rachel Bloom
80	2/8/2017	Patrick Warburton
81	2/10/2017	David Oyelowo
82	2/13/2017	Stephen Dorff
83	2/15/2017	Regis Philbin
84	2/17/2017	Dan Bucatinsky
85	2/27/2017	Jon Lovitz
86	3/1/2017	James Arthur & Brandy Clark
87	3/3/2017	Katy Colloton & Katie O'Brien
88	3/6/2017	Andrea Riseborough & Henry Phillips
89	3/8/2017	Anne Heche
90	3/10/2017	Tyler Oakley
91	3/13/2017	Christina Tosi
92	3/15/2017	JJ Virgin & Davenport Family
93	3/17/2017	Justin Bartha
94	3/20/2017	Mr. T
95	3/22/2017	Harvey Mackay
96	3/24/2017	Nelly Furtado
97	3/27/2017	Duff Goldman
98	3/29/2017	Simon Sinek
99	3/31/2017	Zachary Levi
100	4/3/2017	Brooklyn Decker
101	4/5/2017	Carl Reiner
102	4/7/2017	Margo Martindale
103	4/10/2017	Mario Batali
104	4/12/2017	Lamorne Morris
105	4/14/2017	Cynthia Nixon
106	4/17/2017	Chris Bosh
107	4/19/2017	Charlamagne Tha God
108	4/21/2017	Matthew Rhys
109	4/24/2017	James Cromwell
110	4/26/2017	Macy Gray
111	4/28/2017	Yara Shahidi & Bonnie-Jill Laflin
112	5/1/2017	Dennis Miller
113	5/3/2017	Hank Azaria
114	5/5/2017	Kelly Rowland
115	5/8/2017	Eric Stonestreet
116	5/10/2017	Randall Park
117	5/12/2017	Kelly Osbourne
118	5/15/2017	Caitlyn Jenner
119	5/17/2017	Bellamy Young
120	5/19/2017	Ben Falcone
121	5/22/2017	Faith Evans
122	5/24/2017	Dennis Lehane
123	5/26/2017	Seth Gabel & Jimmy O. Yang
124	5/29/2017	Enrique Santos
125	5/31/2017	Ben Schwartz
126	6/2/2017	Nick Swisher
127	6/5/2017	Lauren Scruggs Kennedy
128	6/7/2017	Taryn Manning
129	6/9/2017	Jeff Dunham
130	6/12/2017	Candis Cayne
131	6/14/2017	T.J. Miller
132	6/16/2017	Mandy Moore
133	6/19/2017	Jazz Jennings
134	6/21/2017	Yeardley Smith
135	6/23/2017	Ice Cube
136	6/26/2017	Miranda Cosgrove
137	6/28/2017	Jerrod Carmichael
138	6/30/2017	Alison Brie
139	7/3/2017	Neil DeGrasse Tyson
140	7/5/2017	Vanessa Williams
141	7/7/2017	Mike Colter

== Season 6 ==
Season 6
Episode	Air Date	Guest/topic
1	7/24/2017	Russell Brand
2	7/26/2017	Amir Khan
3	7/28/2017	Geri Halliwell
4	7/31/2017	Claire Foy
5	8/2/2017	Annie Lennox
6	8/4/2017	Tara Reid & Ian Ziering
7	8/7/2017	Anthony Michael Hall
8	8/9/2017	Issa Rae
9	8/11/2017	Max Greenfield
10	8/14/2017	Bridget Everett
11	8/16/2017	Vic Mensa
12	8/18/2017	Nikolaj Coster-Waldau
13	8/21/2017	Corey Taylor
14	8/23/2017	Jay Ellis & Andrea Savage
15	8/25/2017	Willem Dafoe
16	8/28/2017	Jay Baruchel
17	8/30/2017	Lake Bell
18	9/1/2017	W. Kamau Bell
19	9/4/2017	Drew & Jonathan Scott
20	9/6/2017	Bill Pullman
21	9/8/2017	Chrissy Metz
22	9/11/2017	Chris Jericho
23	9/13/2017	Khalid
24	9/15/2017	Danny Pudi
25	9/18/2017	Brendon Burchard
26	9/20/2017	Aisha Tyler
27	9/22/2017	Justin Hartley
28	9/25/2017	Tess Holliday & Zach Miko
29	9/27/2017	Malcolm-Jamal Warner
30	9/29/2017	Abbi Jacobson & Ilana Glazer
31	10/2/2017	Natalie Morales & Katy Mixon
32	10/4/2017	Tony Goldwyn
33	10/6/2017	Chris Hardwick
34	10/9/2017	James Lipton
35	10/11/2017	John Michael Higgins
36	10/13/2017	Whitney Cummings
37	10/16/2017	Nick Kroll
38	10/18/2017	Debbie Allen
39	10/20/2017	Kim Zolciak-Biermann
40	10/23/2017	Tionne "T-Boz" Watkins
41	10/25/2017	Roma Downey
42	10/27/2017	Taran Killam
43	10/30/2017	Beck Bennett
44	11/1/2017	Andrew Zimmern
45	11/3/2017	Buddy Valastro
46	11/6/2017	Melissa Rivers
47	11/8/2017	Griffin Dunne
48	11/10/2017	Rob Schneider
49	11/13/2017	Sheila Nevins
50	11/15/2017	Bob Saget
51	11/17/2017	Paul Reiser
52	11/20/2017	Bob Harper
53	11/22/2017	Debi Mazar
54	11/24/2017	Steve Dorff
55	11/27/2017	Ben Feldman
56	11/29/2017	Sean Avery
57	11/30/2017	Dr. Edith Eger
58	12/1/2017	Laura Linney
59	12/4/2017	Anthony Anderson
60	12/6/2017	Jason Silva
61	12/8/2017	Jim Belushi
62	12/11/2017	Ed Helms
63	12/13/2017	Eliza Coupe
64	12/15/2017	The State of Hate in America
65	12/18/2017	Katt Williams
66	12/20/2017	Padma Lakshmi
67	12/22/2017	John Cho
68	1/3/2018	Lena Waithe
69	1/5/2018	Jerry O'Connell
70	1/8/2018	Sam Jones
71	1/10/2018	Rob Riggle
72	1/12/2018	Garrett Hedlund
73	1/15/2018	Rapsody & Nicholas Gonzalez
74	1/17/2018	Suzann and James Pawelski
75	1/18/2018	D'Arcy Carden and Esther Povitsky
76	1/22/2018	Allison Janney
77	1/24/2018	Rebecca Romijn
78	1/26/2018	Fred Armisen
79	1/29/2018	Édgar Ramírez
80	1/31/2018	Jenifer Lewis
81	2/2/2018	Andy Grammer
82	2/5/2018	Yolanda Hadid
83	2/7/2018	Laila Ali
84	2/9/2018	Loretta Devine
85	2/12/2018	Chadwick Boseman
86	2/14/2018	Forest Whitaker
87	2/16/2018	Pete Holmes
88	2/19/2018	Ned Colletti
89	2/21/2018	Tabatha Coffey
90	2/23/2018	Richard Jenkins
91	2/26/2018	Angela Kinsey
92	2/28/2018	X Ambassadors
93	3/2/2018	The Truth About Changing Your Personality
94	3/5/2018	Jason Ritter
95	3/7/2018	Christine Lahti
96	3/9/2018	David Koechner
97	3/12/2018	American tennis champions at Indian Wells
98	3/14/2018	Darren Criss
99	3/16/2018	Dr. Eben Alexander
100	3/19/2018	Adam Rodriguez
101	3/21/2018	Judd Apatow
102	3/23/2018	Colin Cowherd
103	3/26/2018	Oliver Hudson
104	3/28/2018	Jay Duplass
105	3/30/2018	Jay Pharoah
106	4/2/2018	Thomas Middleditch
107	4/4/2018	Dan Stevens
108	4/6/2018	Bruce Dern
109	4/9/2018	Sharon Osbourne
110	4/11/2018	Lessons from the World's Most Successful People
111	4/13/2018	Snooki
112	4/16/2018	Zooey Deschanel
113	4/18/2018	Anders Holm
114	4/20/2018	Paula Patton
115	4/23/2018	Nancy Lieberman
116	4/25/2018	Sheryl Underwood
117	4/27/2018	Tyler Henry
118	4/30/2018	Marlee Matlin
119	5/2/2018	Mark Duplass
120	5/4/2018	Portugal. The Man
121	5/7/2018	Erika Jayne
122	5/9/2018	O-T Fagbenle & Shane Feldman
123	5/11/2018	Marcia Gay Harden
124	5/14/2018	PJ Morton
125	5/16/2018	Ryan Serhant
126	5/18/2018	Phillip Picardi
127	5/21/2018	Nyle DiMarco
128	5/23/2018	Rashad Jennings
129	5/25/2018	Jussie Smollett
130	5/28/2018	Carol Kane
131	5/30/2018	Harlan Coben
132	6/1/2018	Jordan Klepper
133	6/4/2018	Chris Harrison
134	6/11/2018	John Mulaney
135	6/13/2018	Elizabeth Marvel & Fortune Feimster
136	6/15/2018	Martin Seligman
137	6/18/2018	Holland Taylor
138	6/20/2018	Lil Rel Howery
139	6/25/2018	Walton Goggins
140	6/27/2018	Todd Fisher

== Season 7 ==
Season 7
Episode	Air date	Guest/topic
1	7/18/2018	The Miz & Maryse
2	7/20/2018	Combating America's Suicide Crisis
3	7/23/2018	Jonathan Rhys Meyers
4	7/25/2018	Melissa Leo
5	7/27/2018	Simon Pegg
6	7/30/2018	Jim Gaffigan
7	8/1/2018	Trixie Mattel
8	8/3/2018	KYLE & Aloe Blacc
9	8/6/2018	Phil Rosenthal
10	8/8/2018	50 Cent
11	8/10/2018	Jon M. Chu
12	8/13/2018	Brett Morgen
13	8/15/2018	Dionne Warwick
14	8/17/2018	Uzo Aduba
15	8/20/2018	Matt Smith
16	8/22/2018	Awkwafina
17	8/24/2018	Ben Schwartz
18	8/27/2018	Bazzi & Anne-Marie
19	8/29/2018	Nick Cannon
20	8/31/2018	Andie McDowell
21	9/3/2018	Chuck Liddell
22	9/5/2018	Dame Joan Collins
23	9/8/2018	Yvonne Orji
24	9/10/2018	Rhett and Link
25	9/12/2018	Mason Panel
26	9/14/2018	Michaele Watkins
27	9/17/2018	Tom Berenger
28	9/19/2018	Olivia Munn
29	9/21/2018	Mark Leibovich
30	9/24/2018	Evan & Ashlee Simpson Ross
31	9/26/2018	Paul Sheer
32	9/28/2018	Daymond John
33	10/1/2018	The Irwins
34	10/3/2018	Sue Cameron
35	10/5/2018	Justine Bateman
36	10/8/2018	Neil deGrasse Tyson
37	10/10/2018	Andrew Dice Clay
38	10/12/2018	Tinashe
39	10/15/2018	Dennis Miller
40	10/17/2018	Ellie Kemper
41	10/19/2018	Frank Grillo
42	10/20/2018	Steven Yeun
43	10/24/2018	Tara Lapinski
44	10/26/2018	Vivica A. Fox
45	10/29/2018	How to Live Forever
46	10/31/2018	Rupert Everrett
47	11/2/2018	Alfonso Ribeiro
48	11/5/2018	Tom Segura
49	11/7/2018	Garrard Conley
50	11/9/2018	Eckhart Tolle
51	11/12/2018	Gary Busey
52	11/14/2018	Michelle Rodrguez
53	11/16/2018	Sebastian Maniscalco
54	11/21/2018	Bill Maher
55	11/23/2018	NeNe Leakes
56	11/26/2018	Kathleen Turner
57	11/28/2018	Andy Bernstein
58	11/30/2018	George Wallace
59	12/3/2018	Adam Conover
60	12/5/2018	Jeff Ross
61	12/7/2018	Itzhak Perlman
62	12/10/2018	Eric Kandle
63	12/12/2018	Rickey Smiley
64	12/14/2018	Chris Elliot
65	12/17/2018	Angela Lansbury
66	12/19/2018	Patrick Wilson
67	12/21/2018	Harry T
68	12/24/2018	State of Faith in America
69	1/2/2019	Meditation Panel
70	1/4/2019	Cheyenne Jackson
71	1/7/2019	Lisa Vanderpump
72	1/9/2019	Bob Lazar & Jeremy Corbell
73	1/11/2019	Taye Diggs
74	1/14/2019	Shin Lim
75	1/16/2019	Markiplier
76	1/18/2019	Mike Posner
77	1/21/2019	Paul W. Downs
78	1/23/2019	Life After Hate
79	1/25/2019	Amanda Seales
80	1/28/2019	Ozzie Areu
81	1/30/2019	Jeffrey Schwartz
82	2/1/2019	Josh Altman
83	2/4/2019	Matt LeBlanc
84	2/6/2019	Phoebe Robinson
85	2/8/2019	Eve
86	2/11/2019	Killer Mike
87	2/13/2019	Sonequa Martin-Green
88	2/15/2019	Tony Fernandes
89	2/18/2019	John Walsh
90	2/20/2019	Brigitte Nielsen
91	2/22/2019	Stephen Merchant
92	2/25/2019	Derek Hough
93	2/27/2019	Tom Green
94	3/1/2019	Understanding Blockchain
95	3/4/2019	Isaac Mizrahi
96	3/6/3019	Glenn Howerton
97	3/8/2019	Gus Kenworthy
98	3/11/2019	Kristin Cavallari
99	3/13/2019	Thomas Lennon
100	3/15/2019	Karamo Brown
101	3/18/2019	Larry Charles
102	3/20/2019	Rita Wilson
103	3/22/2019	Ne-Yo
104	3/25/2019	Danny DeVito
105	3/27/2019	Michelle Visage
106	3/29/2019	Adam Rippon
107	4/3/2019	Joseph Gordon-Levitt
108	4/5/2019	Lydia Herst
109	4/8/2019	Elizabeth McGovern
110	4/10/2019	Ableism in Hollywood
111	4/12/2019	Anna Chlumsky
112	4/15/2019	Dr. Dean Ornish
113	4/22/2019	Oscar De La Hoya
114	4/24/2019	Nate Berkus & Jeremiah Brent
115	4/26/2019	Raja Kumari
116	5/1/2019	Steve Lemme & Kevin Heffernan
117	5/3/2019	Jack Osbourne
118	5/6/2019	Craig Ferguson
119	5/8/2019	Lori Gottlieb
120	5/10/2019	Andrew Dice Clay
121	5/13/2019	Nate Bargatze
122	5/15/2019	Ana Gasteyer
123	5/17/2019	David Koechner
124	5/20/2019	Guinevere Turner
125	5/22/2019	Dr. Drew Pinsky
126	5/24/2019	Dane Cook
127	5/27/2019	Henry Rollins
128	5/29/2019	Tony Hawk
129	5/31/2019	Clem Burke
130	6/3/2019	Kevin Nealon
131	6/5/2019	Mark Manson
132	6/7/2019	Seth Green
133	6/10/2019	Bryan Callen
134	6/12/2019	Lamar Odom
135	6/14/2019	Matt Iseman & Akbar Gbaja-Biamila
136	6/17/2019	Sheryl Underwood
137	6/19/2019	Jared Harris
138	6/21/2019	Cat Cora
139	6/24/2019	Bobby Moynihan
140	6/25/2019	Sherri Shepherd
141	6/28/2019	Jacques Torres
142	7/1/2019	Adam Carolla
143	7/3/2019	Dr. Daniel Amen

== Season 8 ==
Season 8
Episode	Air date	Guest/topic
1	7/15/2019	Mira Sorvino
2	7/17/2019	Colin Cowherd
3	7/19/2019	Chris Parnell
4	7/22/2019	Justin Long
5	7/24/2019	RuPaul
6	7/26/2019	Adam Savage
7	7/29/2019	Julia Sweeney
8	7/31/2019	Simon Pagenaud
9	8/2/2019	Barbie Ferreira
10	8/5/2019	Leah Remini
11	8/7/2019	Rodney Mullen
12	8/9/2019	Metta World Peace with guest host Dennis Miller
13	8/12/2019	Manny MUA
14	8/14/2019	Jason Bentley
15	8/16/2019	Marlon Wayans
16	8/19/2019	Jim Gaffigan
17	8/21/2019	Jay Leno
18	8/23/2019	Paula Pell
19	8/26/2019	David Mandel
20	8/28/2019	Margaret Cho
21	8/30/2019	David Epstein
22	9/2/2019	Yvette Nicole Brown
23	9/4/2019	Jennifer Tilly
24	9/6/2019	Carrot Top
25	9/9/2019	Jenna Johnson
26	9/11/2019	Tony Hale
27	9/13/2019	Jo Koy
28	9/16/2019	Illeana Douglas
29	9/18/2019	Jon Lovitz
30	9/20/2019	Amy Landecker
31	9/23/2019	Tim Meadows
32	9/25/2019	Tyler Kepner
33	9/27/2019	Todrick Hall
34	9/30/2019	Paul Shaffer
35	10/2/2019	Kevin Smith
36	10/4/2019	Deon Cole
37	10/7/2019	Nico Santos
38	10/9/2019	Jimmy Fallon
39	10/11/2019	Neil DeGrasse Tyson
40	10/14/2019	Tony Gonzalez
41	10/16/2019	Alexandra Shipp
42	10/21/2019	Evan Funke
43	10/23/2019	Constance Zimmer & Missi Pyle
44	10/25/2019	Gene Simmons
45	10/28/2019	Tilman Fertitta
46	10/30/2019	Pam Grier
47	11/1/2019	Jerry Springer
48	11/4/2019	Shaggy
49	11/6/2019	Edward Norton
50	11/8/2019	Debbie Gibson
51	11/11/2019	Timothy Omundson
52	11/13/2019	Daisy Fuentes
53	11/15/2019	Kellie Pickler
54	11/18/2019	Mo Rocca
55	11/20/2019	Russell Peters
56	11/22/2019	Dr. Terry Dubrow & Dr. Paul Nassif
57	11/25/2019	Adewale Akinnuoye-Agbaje
58	11/27/2019	Alfonso Ribeiro
59	11/29/2019	Nick Lachey
60	12/2/2019	Martin Starr
61	12/4/2019	Brett Gelman
62	12/6/2019	Kristin Chenoweth
63	12/9/2019	Karen Gillan
64	12/11/2019	Sam & Aaron Taylor-Johnson
65	12/13/2019	Craig Ferguson
66	12/16/2019	Robbie & Stephen Amell
67	12/18/2019	Elizabeth Perkins
68	12/20/2019	Michael Rapaport
69	12/23/2019	Maria Menounos
70	1/3/2020	Michael Zegen
71	1/6/2020	Felicia Day
72	1/8/2020	Josh Flagg
73	1/10/2020	David Kessler
74	1/13/2020	Rob Paulsen
75	1/15/2020	Chris Harrison
76	1/17/2020	Tia Carrere
77	1/20/2020	Alzheimer's Disease
78	1/22/2020	Brooklyn Decker
79	1/24/2020	A Dog's Mind
80	1/27/2020	Ron Funches
81	1/29/2020	Tommy Chong
82	1/31/2020	Abby Elliott
83	2/3/2020	Kurt Busch
84	2/5/2020	Danny Pudi
85	2/7/2020	Larry King and guest interviewer Ben Schwartz
