= The Infinite Game =

2019 non-fiction book by Simon Sinek

- First edition
- Author: Simon Sinek
- Language: English
- Subject: Leadership
- Genre: Business
- Published: 2019
- Publisher: Portfolio/Penguin
- Publication date: 2019
- Pages: 251
- ISBN: 9780735213500

The Infinite Game is a 2019 book by Simon Sinek, applying ideas from James P. Carse's similarly titled book, Finite and Infinite Games to topics of business and leadership.

The book is based on Carse's distinction between two types of games: finite games and infinite games. As Sinek explains, finite games (e.g. chess and football) are played with the goal of getting to the end of the game and winning, while following static rules. Every game has a beginning, middle, and end, and a final winner is distinctly recognizable. In contrast, infinite games (e.g. business and politics) are played for the purpose of continuing play rather than to win. Sinek claims that leaders who embrace an infinite mindset, aligned with infinite play, will build stronger, more innovative, inspiring, resilient organizations, though these benefits may accrue over larger timescales than benefits associated with a finite mindset.

== Overview ==
Sinek argues that business fits all the characteristics of an infinite game, notably that: there may be known as well as unknown players; new players can join at any time; each player has their own strategy; there is no set of fixed rules (though law may operate as semi-fixed rules); and there is no beginning or end. Further drawing on Carse's work, Sinek extends the distinction between end states in finite games to claim that business, when viewed through an infinite mindset, do not have winners and losers, but rather players who simply drop out when they run out of the will, the desire, and/or the resources to continue play. According to Sinek, it follows that business leaders should stop thinking about who wins or who is the best and start thinking about how to build and sustain strong and healthy organizations.

== The Infinite Mindset ==
Simon Sinek considers Infinite Mindset as a necessity to be able to succeed in business for long term. Sinek throughout the book is negative towards the finite game. The Infinite Mindset narrates why companies like Blockbuster which were once significant players in Industry, couldn't adapt even after seeing companies like Netflix grow. Many such examples and stories at various points in the book emphasize the importance of Infinite Mindset, which allows companies to think better and survive infinitely.

Sinek explains five essential practices that leaders must follow to have an Infinite Mindset:

- Courage to Lead.
- Existential Flexibility
- Have Worthy Rivals
- Just Cause
- Trusting Teams

== See also ==
- Finite and Infinite Games
- James P. Carse
- Start with Why
- Transactional leadership
- Transformational leadership
