= Ora TV =

On-demand digital television network

- Type: On-demand television Production Company
- Country: United States
- Founded: 2012
- Headquarters: New York City
- Owner: Ora Media, LLC
- Key people: Carlos Slim; Larry King; John Dickey
- Official website: web.archive.org/web/20240412193007/http://www.ora.tv/ (archive)

Ora TV was a television production studio and on-demand digital television network launched in 2012 by television host Larry King and his wife Shawn Southwick King and funded by América Móvil, a business venture of Mexican billionaire Carlos Slim. Ora (which means "now" in Italian and is also Shawn Southwick King's middle name) both produces and distributes television shows including Emmy-nominated Larry King Now, Politicking with Larry King, Off the Grid with Jesse Ventura, The Real Girl's Kitchen, and Brown Bag Wine Tasting with William Shatner. Ora had production offices and studios in New York City and Los Angeles.

== History ==
Ora TV was founded by Larry King, his wife Shawn Southwick-King, and Carlos Slim in 2012 as an outlet to produce a new show for Larry King after leaving CNN. Larry King Now was launched as Ora's first show in July 2012 and aired both on Ora TV and Hulu. In 2014, Larry King Now episode "Head Trauma in the NFL" was nominated for a News and Documentary Emmy Award in the Outstanding News Discussion and Analysis category.

In April 2013, Ora TV acquired Stick Figure Studios, an Emmy award-winning documentary and reality series production company based in New York. Stick Figure is the producer of Catching Hell, a spearfishing docu-drama that aired on The Weather Channel in the summer of 2014, with exclusive digital content on Ora TV.

Ora TV's other content includes Haylie Duff's The Real Girl's Kitchen food & lifestyle series that aired on both Ora TV and the Cooking Channel, the Laugh Factory video archive, and road trip adventure show Wayward Nation, which launched in September 2014.

On June 30, 2015, Ora TV severed ties with American real estate tycoon Donald Trump. Arturo Elías Ayub, Slim's son-in-law and chairman of Ora TV, called his remarks about illegal aliens racist and an insult.

An Episode of Politicking which aired on September 8, 2016, and featured 2016 presidential candidate Donald Trump was the spark of a controversy. Numerous media outlets erroneously reported the interview was done by Russian state-owned, 'Kremlin-backed' television. Ora TV released a statement clarifying that the content is licensed to RT America, but produced independently from the network.

On March 1, 2022, following Russia's invasion of Ukraine, Ora TV suspended production on several shows it produced for RT America, which would cease operations on March 3, 2022.

== Ora-produced shows ==
Year	Name	Starring
2012	Larry King Now	Larry King
2012	Politicking with Larry King	Larry King
2013	Newsbreaker	Alyssa Caverley, Naibe Reynoso & Alexandra Ingersoll
2013	Newsbreaker en Español	Naibe Reynoso
2013	The Daily Rehash	Eric Artell
2013	Dweebcast	Andy Riesmeyer
2014	WTFark	Mike Rylander
2014	Off The Grid	Jesse Ventura
2014	The Real Girl's Kitchen	Haylie Duff
2014	Be Here Nowish	Natalia Leite & Alexandra Roxo
2014	Brown Bag Wine Tasting	William Shatner
2014	Behind the Vine	Eric Artell
2014	Wayward Nation	Mikey McManus
2015	The Rubin Report	Dave Rubin
2016	Modern Traveler	Alyssa Caverley
2016	The Charged Life	Brendon Burchard
