= James Carse =

James Carse may refer to:

- James Alexander Carse (born 1958), Zimbabwean cricketer
- James Howe Carse (c. 1819–1900), British Australian oil painter
- James P. Carse, American religious writer
