= Nate Holzapfel =

American entrepreneur (born 1979)

Nathaniel Holzapfel
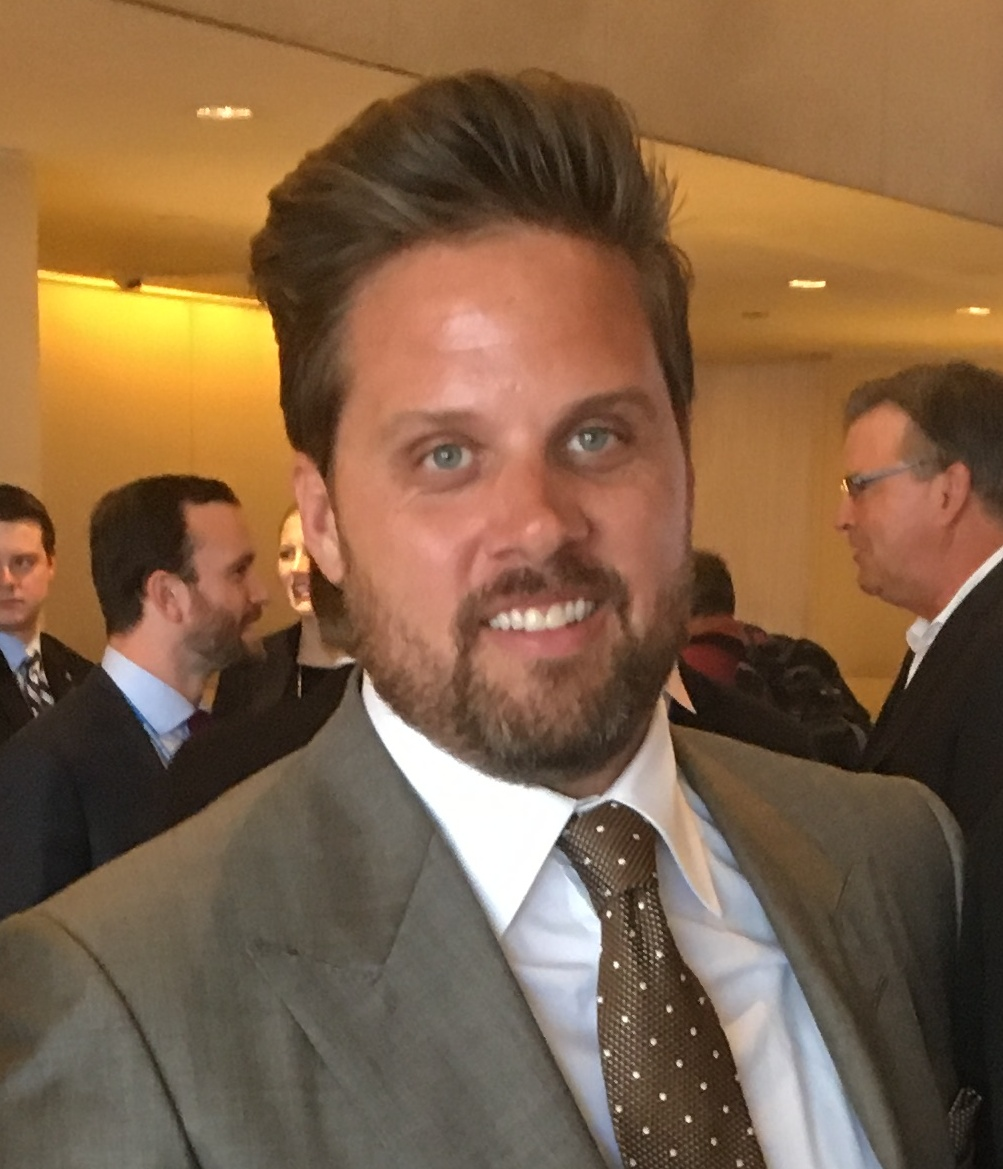
- Holzapfel 2017 Milken Conference
- Born: Nathanael Reid Holzapfel; February 5, 1979 (age 47); Provo, Utah
- Occupations: Public Speaker, entrepreneur
- Imprisoned at: Utah State Prison

Nate Holzapfel (born Nathanael Reid Holzapfel, February 5, 1979) is an American entrepreneur and convicted fraudster known for his appearance on ABC's Shark Tank, where he pitched as a representative of the Mission Belt Co. He then pursued a career in consulting and public speaking.

In February 2015, Holzapfel revealed that he would be featured on a spin-off of Shark Tank, called Beyond the Tank.

In October 2021, Holzapfel was arrested on allegations that he defrauded a woman he had been dating out of nearly $200,000. He tricked her into signing over her house into a company he controlled. The woman is described as having significant health problems and being responsible for taking care of her disabled adult child. He was found guilty in 2023 and sentenced to 1-15 years on multiple charges. The parole board has set his parole date to April 4, 2028.

== Career ==
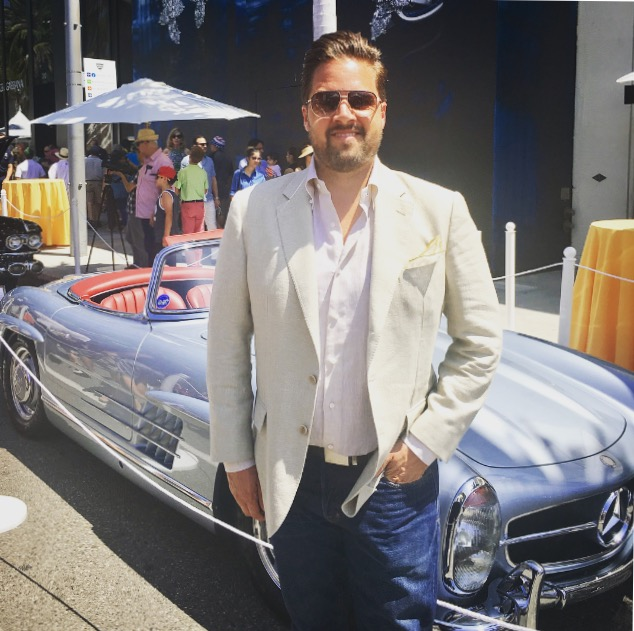
Nate Holzapfel resided in Los Angeles, CA.

=== Mission Belt ===
Mission Belt was founded with the goal of bringing brand recognition to belts, and with a novel design that avoids holes in the belt in favor of a ratchet-inspired belt buckle. After moderate initial success, Holzapfel pitched the company on Shark Tank and was able to negotiate a deal with Daymond John.

After partnering with John, Mission Belt sales increased by over $1 million within three weeks of the show airing. As of early 2017, Mission Belt had $25 million in revenue. Mission Belt has been listed as one of John's top 5 deals on Shark Tank.

Following Holzapfel's arrest in October 2021, Mission Belt issued a statement distancing the company from him, saying he had not been associated with the company for more than seven years.

=== Sales and Management Training ===
Holzapfel offered sales training, coaching, and public speaking services through a personal website. The website is now inactive.

=== The Nate State of Mind ===
In 2015 Holzapfel launched The Nate State of Mind, offering coaching, training, videos, and books about personal branding. The domain TheNateStateofMind.com is no longer registered to Holzapfel.

== Controversies ==
=== Larry King lawsuit ===
In 2019 a lawsuit was filed on behalf of television personality Larry King, in federal court in California. The suit alleged that Holzapfel "used false pretenses to obtain Larry King's participation in a mock interview, then infringed Plaintiffs' common law trademarks and rights of publicity to make it appear that Larry King endorsed Defendants' commercial activities when, in fact, he has not done so."

According to the complaint, King agreed to do the mock interview, conducted in 2013, "as a favor to a family member." The suit goes on to say that King agreed to provide Holzapfel with a copy of the interview, "for the limited and sole purpose of using excerpts from it in a 'sizzle reel' [demonstration video] that Holzapfel could privately submit to a few television producers and others, in the hopes that those producers would hire Holzapfel for a television program. Holzapfel agreed to use the recorded mock Interview only for that limited purpose."

The complaint adds that the promotional video was edited to appear as if Holzapfel had appeared on Larry King Now, when in fact he did not. Alleging trademark infringement, unfair competition and other counts, the suit sought unspecified damages.

In March 2019 the Blast reported King won a default judgment for $250,000 against Holzapfel. Additionally, Holzapfel was ordered to pay $8,600 towards King's legal fees. The judge also ordered Holzapfel to cease using King’s name and likeness and destroy any materials he made featuring King.

=== Fraud and Forcible Sexual Abuse Charges ===
In October 2021, Holzapfel was charged with several counts of communication fraud. The Utah County Attorney's Office charging documents alleged that Holzapfel defrauded a woman he had been dating out of nearly $200,000 "by tricking her into signing over her house into a company he controlled. The woman is described as having significant health problems and being responsible for taking care of her disabled adult child."

KUTV in Salt Lake City also reported:

"charging documents alleged, Holzapfel pressured the woman into selling her house and investing in one of his companies, which turned out not to even exist at that time. Holzapfel eventually listed the woman’s house for sale in August 2020 without her knowledge, prosecutors said, and kept most of the profits, giving her only $11,000 from the sale. '[Holzapfel] used these funds to pay for existing personal debts on his motor vehicle, attorney fees, credit cards, and to purchase expensive luxury items like firearms and gun supplies,' prosecutors wrote in the charging documents. Throughout this entire process, prosecutors said, Holzapfel failed to tell the woman he was married and that he was in financial trouble after getting sued and having a judgment entered against him for more than $250,000."

Utah County investigators believe there are other victims of the same scheme and asked them to come forward. The charging documents and an arrest warrant dated September 22, 2021 are available online.

Following news of Holzapfel's arrest, Mission Belt told KUTV he had not been associated with the company for several years and did not represent its values.

Investigators say Holzapfel, who is married, met a woman on Tinder in August. In September, Holzapfel "began grooming the victim by telling her that he would help her invest her money so that she could live like a gold girl. (He) then told the victim that he would invest $50,000 from the victim's late husband's life insurance policy into his company Bristol and Beard," according to new charging documents.

In January 2022 he was charged with defrauding a third victim.

In March 2022 he was charged in one case with two counts of forcible sexual abuse, a second-degree felony, and in a second case with two counts of theft, a second-degree felony.

In May 2022, Holzapfel was charged with communications fraud, a second-degree felony. According to additional charging documents. Holzapfel contacted a woman in regard to a business idea she had. Two days later, he told the woman her idea would be a "big hit" and offered to assist her for $4,000, the charges state. Holzapfel then charged the woman's credit cards for a total of $9,000 without her permission.

Holzapfel was charged with eight criminal cases. Six counts of communications fraud, three counts of theft by deception, four counts of forcible sexual abuse, theft, being an unlicensed broker, and four counts of lewdness. He pleaded guilty to several fraud and sexual battery charges in exchange for other charges being dropped.

=== Conviction and Sentencing ===
In August 2023, Holzapfel was sentenced to a minimum of one year imprisonment and a maximum of 15, plus approximately $300,000 in restitution. Judge Thomas Low had rejected a defense negotiated plea deal which would have allowed Holzapfel to avoid doing time in prison.

In rebuffing the request from Holzapfel's attorney to withdraw the guilty plea, Judge Low indicated that the court wasn't bound by the plea agreement saying “I understand that this negotiation was developed over a long period of time and that’s been made clear to the court, [...] but the treachery and the abuse that has occurred also occurred over a long period of time. The life-altering impacts you have had on these victims … are shocking.” Holzapfel was handcuffed and taken into custody immediately after the sentencing.

== Filmography ==
Beyond the Tank (TV Series) 2016

- Episode #2.12 (2016) ... Himself - Mission Belt

Shark Tank (TV Series) 2013 - 2014 Himself - Entrepreneur: The Mission Belt

- Episode #5.29 (2014) ... Himself - Entrepreneur: The Mission Belt (uncredited)
- Episode #5.4 (2013) ... Himself - Entrepreneur: The Mission Belt
- Episode #4.22 (2013) ... Himself - Entrepreneur: The Mission Belt
