= Sinek =

Sinek is a surname. Notable people with the surname include:

- Charles Sinek (born 1968), American ice dancer
- Simon Sinek (born 1973), British-American author
