= The Real Girl's Kitchen =

American food reality television series

- Genre: Cooking show; Food reality television
- Presented by: Haylie Duff
- Country of origin: United States
- Original language: English
- No. of seasons: 2
- No. of episodes: 23

Production
- Production locations: Los Angeles, California
- Running time: 22:00
- Production company: Ora TV

Original release
- Network: Cooking Channel
- Release: August 9, 2014 – July 25, 2015

The Real Girl's Kitchen is an American cooking show that aired on Cooking Channel. The series was presented by actress Haylie Duff; and it featured Duff showcasing recipes inspired by her travels to New York City, as well as her hometown of Los Angeles.

The Real Girl's Kitchen premiered on August 9, 2014 and concluded on July 25, 2015, after two seasons.

== Episodes ==
=== Season 1 (2014) ===
No.	Title	Original air date
1	"Mali-Booyah!"	June 7, 2014
2	"Hot Off the Grill"	June 14, 2014
3	"Book'lyn"	June 21, 2014
4	"Cooking for a King"	June 28, 2014
5	"Duff Family Crab Boil"	July 5, 2014
6	"Pho Sho"	July 12, 2014
7	"Brunch, Bellinis, and Besties"	July 19, 2014
8	"Big Game Eats"	July 26, 2014
9	"Haylie Hearts Venice"	August 2, 2014
10	"Sweet Heat"	August 9, 2014

=== Season 2 (2015) ===
No.	Title	Original air date
1	"A Duff Cake"	April 25, 2015
2	"A Sweet and Salty Shower"	May 2, 2015
3	"Yo Mama"	May 9, 2015
4	"The H Word"	May 16, 2015
5	"Save the Date"	May 23, 2015
6	"Secret Sauce"	May 30, 2015
7	"Glamping"	June 13, 2015
8	"Spice Girls"	June 20, 2015
9	"Texas Hold 'Em"	June 27, 2015
10	"California Rolls"	July 4, 2015
11	"MexiCali"	July 11, 2015
12	"Raising the Bar"	July 18, 2015
13	"SOBE Skills"	July 25, 2015

== Awards and nominations ==
Year	Ceremony	Category	Result
2015	Daytime Emmy	Outstanding Directing in a Lifestyle/Culinary/Travel Program	Nominated
