= Politicking with Larry King =

American political television talk show

- Genre: Talk show
- Starring: Larry King
- Country of origin: United States
- Original language: English
- No. of seasons: 2
- No. of episodes: 257

Production
- Executive producer: David Theall
- Production company: Ora TV

Original release
- Release: June 13, 2013 – October 29, 2020

Related
- Larry King Now

Politicking with Larry King is an American political talk show hosted by Larry King that aired from June 13, 2013, to October 29, 2020. The guests of the show included various political figures and world leaders. The series was available on Ora TV, Hulu, and RT America. The show was distributed worldwide by RT America and Ora TV; the latter also produced another show hosted by King from 2012 to 2020, Larry King Now, which focused on interviews with celebrity guests.

The show received criticism because it airs on the RT America network, which has frequently been described as "pro-Russian"; it has also been alleged that it has been used as a "Kremlin's propaganda tool". King addressed such claims by saying: "I don't work for RT. It's a deal made between the companies. They just license our shows," and also adding that "to [his] knowledge" the network has never altered any interviews that he has done, "If they took something out, I would never do it. It would be bad if they tried to edit out things. I wouldn’t put up with it."

A number of guest hosts stood in for Larry King, including Matthew Cooke.
