= Start with Why =

Book by Simon Sinek

Start with Why: How Great Leaders Inspire Everyone to Take Action
- First edition
- Author: Simon Sinek
- Language: English
- Subject: Entrepreneurship
- Genre: Business
- Published: 2009; 2011 reprinted
- Publisher: Portfolio
- Publication date: 2009
- Pages: 255
- ISBN: 978-1-59184-280-4

Start with Why: How Great Leaders Inspire Everyone to Take Action is a 2009 book by Simon Sinek.

== Overview ==
The book starts with comparing the two main ways to influence human behaviour: manipulation and inspiration. Sinek argues that inspiration is the more powerful and sustainable of the two. The book primarily discusses the significance of leadership and purpose to succeed in life and business. Sinek highlights the importance of taking the risk and going against the status-quo to find solutions to global problems. He believes leadership holds the key to inspiring a nation to come together and advance a common interest to make a nation, or the planet, a more civilised place. He turns to Dr. Martin Luther King Jr, John F Kennedy, Steve Jobs and the entire Apple culture as examples of how a purpose can be created to inspire a culture together, away from the manipulative society we live in today. This is highly important especially considering the amount of time we spend on our smartphones and other devices.

== The golden circle ==
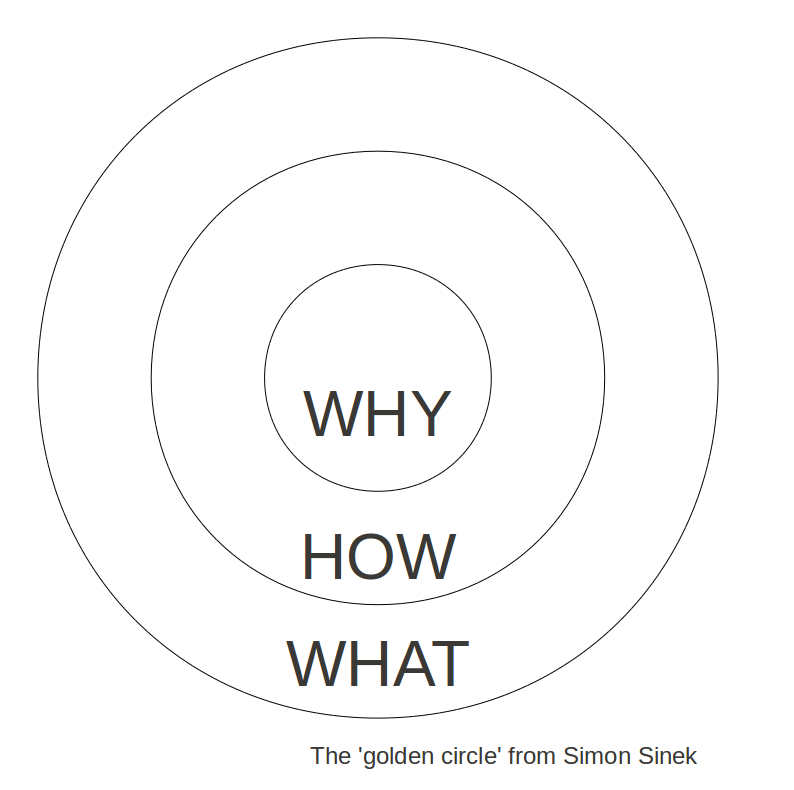
The golden circle diagram, redrawn from Start with Why

Sinek says people are inspired by a sense of purpose (or "Why"), and that this should come first when communicating, before "How" and "What". Sinek calls this triad the golden circle, a diagram of a bullseye (or concentric circles or onion diagram) with "Why" in the innermost circle (representing people's motives or purposes), surrounded by a ring labelled "How" (representing people's processes or methods), enclosed in a ring labelled "What" (representing results or outcomes). He speculates about the biological factors behind this structure, such as the limbic system.

== Reception ==
Lindsay McGregor and Neel Doshi, co-authors of the book Primed to Perform: How to Build the Highest Performing Cultures Through the Science of Total Motivation, came to a similar conclusion: "Why we work determines how well we work."

Ken Krogue, in a blog post for Forbes, argued that it is far more important, especially for salespeople, to find the right person (which Krogue called "starting with Who") before "starting with Why":

Great salespeople always start with Who. Then they move to Why, What, and How. And then eventually to When, and How Much. ... Now once you get to the right Who, Simon Sinek is spot-on about beginning the conversation with Why. Why is a game-changer in selling modern technology.

== Sales ==
According to NPD BookScan's mid-June 2016 to mid-June 2017 ranking of printed book sales, Start with Why ranked (without disclosing the geographical region) as the "bestselling leadership book" of that period, selling 171,000 paperback copies.

== See also ==
- Five Ws
- The Infinite Game
