= Naibe Reynoso =

American television personality

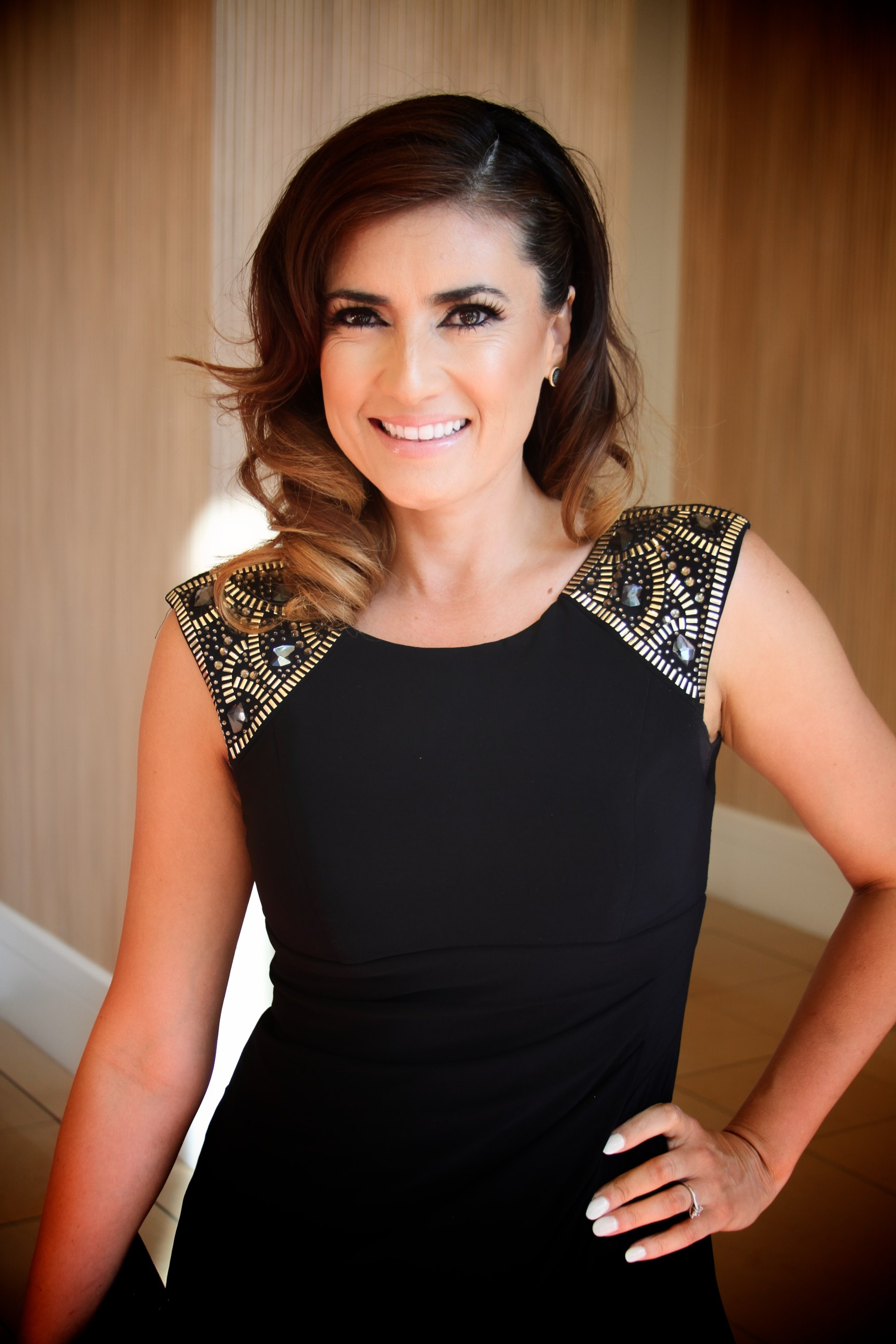
- Reynoso at the 2014 Imagen Awards

Naibe Reynoso is a television reporter and a member of the George Foster Peabody Awards board of jurors.

Naibe Reynoso is a journalist who has won two local Emmys and has been nominated several times. She has worked in Los Angeles, Phoenix and Denver, Colorado. Most recently she hosted Hola L.A. on KCAL/CBS an English-language talk show with a Latina point of view.

Her bilingual children's book, How To Stuff a Piñata: Cómo Rellenar Una Piñata, won a Silver Medal for Best Bilingual Children's Fiction at the 2025 International Latino Book Awards.
