= Larry King Now =

American television talk show

- Genre: Talk show
- Starring: Larry King
- Country of origin: United States
- Original language: English
- No. of seasons: 8
- No. of episodes: 1000 (list of episodes)

Production
- Executive producer: Jason Rovou
- Production locations: Los Angeles, California
- Production company: Ora TV

Original release
- Network: Ora TV; Hulu; RT America
- Release: July 17, 2012 – February 7, 2020

Related
- Larry King Live

Larry King Now is an American television talk show hosted by Larry King, available on Ora TV, Hulu, and RT America. Launched on July 17, 2012, the series featured interviews with newsmakers, world leaders, celebrities, and Internet stars. This show is similar to his previous CNN program, Larry King Live.

== Broadcasting ==
The show was the first venture by Ora TV, an on-demand TV network founded in March 2012 by King, his seventh wife, Shawn Southwick–King, and Carlos Slim. In May 2013, RT America announced that Larry King Now would be broadcast on their network as well, along with the Ora TV show Politicking with Larry King.

Larry King Now aired its final episode on February 7, 2020, less than a year after King suffered a stroke, and less than a year before his death from sepsis in January 2021.
