= Finite and Infinite Games =

1986 book by James P. Carse

- First edition
- Author: James P. Carse
- Publisher: Free Press
- Publication date: 1986
- ISBN: 0-02-905980-1

Finite and Infinite Games: A Vision of Life as Play and Possibility is a philosophical treatise by James P. Carse, published in 1986. In it, Carse proposes that all human behavior can be categorized into two types of play. Finite games, such as chess or politics, have defined boundaries, fixed rules, and clear winners, played with the sole purpose of bringing the game to an end. In contrast, infinite games, such as culture, love, and life itself, have evolving rules and open boundaries; they are played for the purpose of continuing play and welcoming new participants.

Philosopher David Chalmers has called it a "neglected classic in the philosophy of living".

== Summary ==
=== Finite vs. infinite games ===
A review of the book summarizes Carse's argument: "There are at least two kinds of games: finite and infinite. A finite game is played for the purpose of winning, an infinite game for the purpose of continuing the play. Finite games are those instrumental activities – from sports to politics to wars – in which the participants obey rules, recognize boundaries and announce winners and losers. The infinite game – there is only one – includes any authentic interaction, from touching to culture, that changes rules, plays with boundaries and exists solely for the purpose of continuing the game. A finite player seeks power; the infinite one displays self-sufficient strength. Finite games are theatrical, necessitating an audience; infinite ones are dramatic, involving participants ...".

=== Theatrical vs. Dramatic ===
Carse continues these conceptualizations across all major spheres of human affairs. He extends his themes broadly over several intellectual arenas that are largely otherwise disparate disciplines. He describes human pursuits as either dramatic (enacted in the present) or theatrical (performed according to a script of some kind). This distinction hinges on an agent's decision to engage in one state of affairs or another. If motherhood is a requirement and a duty, there are rules to be obeyed and goals to be achieved. This is motherhood as theatrical role. If motherhood is a choice and a process, it becomes a living drama.

== Reception ==
Finite and Infinite Games received mixed reviews. Howard A. Paul suggested that the book would be valuable in the education of therapists, whereas Francis Kane of The New York Times was critical of the book's premise and logic. Meanwhile technologist Kevin Kelly praised it for "alter[ing] my thinking about life, the universe, and everything." Reviews in Commonweal and Publishers Weekly were more balanced. Theology professor John F. Haught, writing in The Washington Times magazine noted the connection between Carse's book and the works of Søren Kierkegaard, Henri Bergson, René Descartes. Finite and Infinite Games received a mixed review in Kirkus Reviews which stated "For every (not too original) insight worth remembering ... there's a pair of others too familiar ... or awkward ... to hold our attention". Philosopher David Chalmers has called it a "neglected classic in the philosophy of living".

== See also ==
- List of games with concealed rules
