= Larry King =

American TV and radio host (1933–2021)

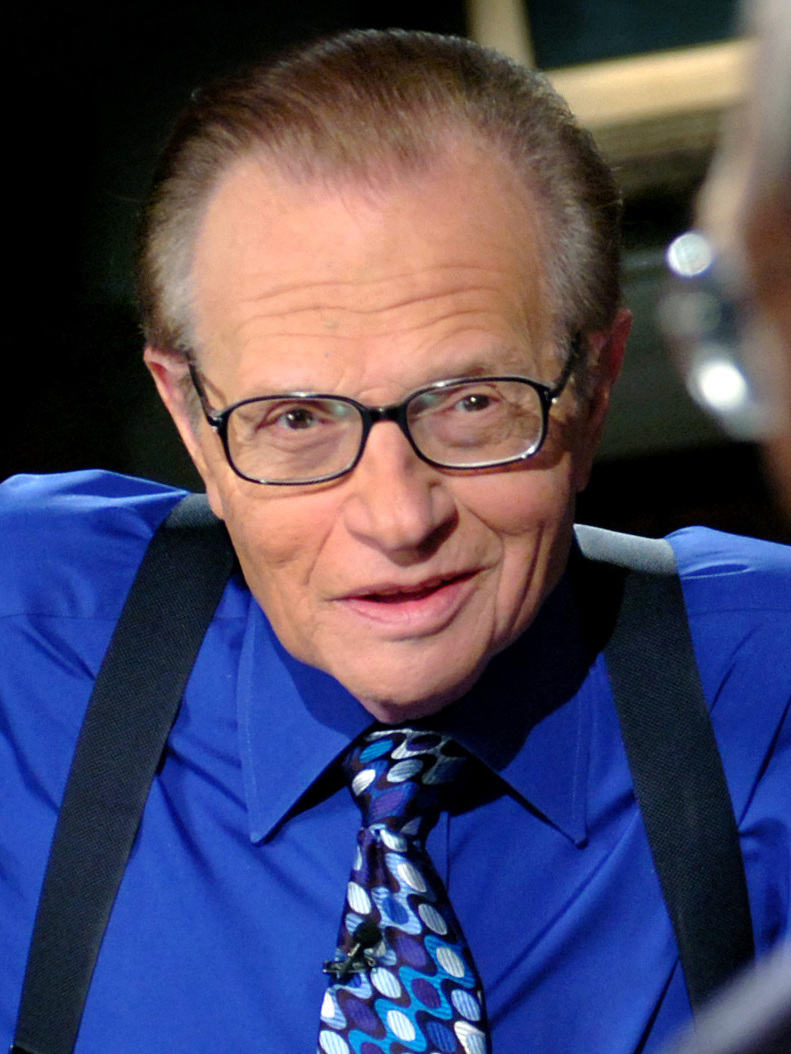
- King in 2006
- Born: Lawrence Harvey Zeiger; November 19, 1933; New York City, U.S.
- Died: January 23, 2021 (aged 87); Los Angeles, California, U.S.
- Resting place: Hillside Memorial Park Cemetery
- Occupations: Radio host; TV host; author; spokesman
- Years active: 1957–2021
- Spouses: Freda Miller (m. 1952; ann. 1953) Annette Kaye (m. 1961; div. 1961) Alene Akins (m. 1961; div. 1963) (m. 1969; div. 1972) Mickey Sutphin (m. 1963; div. 1967) Sharon Lepore (m. 1976; div. 1983) Julie Alexander (m. 1989; div. 1992) Shawn Southwick (m. 1997; sep. 2019)
- Children: 5

Larry King (born Lawrence Harvey Zeiger; November 19, 1933 – January 23, 2021) was an American TV and radio host, author and spokesman. He was a WMBM radio interviewer in the Miami area in the 1950s and 1960s. Beginning in 1978, King gained national prominence as host of The Larry King Show, an all-night nationwide call-in radio program heard over the Mutual Broadcasting System. From 1985 to 2010, he hosted the nightly interview television program Larry King Live on CNN. King hosted Larry King Now from 2012 to 2020, which ran on Hulu, Ora TV, and RT America. He hosted Politicking with Larry King, a weekly political talk show, on the same three channels from 2013 to 2020. King conducted over 50,000 interviews on radio and television.

King was born and raised in Brooklyn, New York, to Jewish parents who immigrated to the United States from what is now Belarus in the 1920s. He studied at Lafayette High School, a public high school in Brooklyn.

During his career, King also appeared in television series and films, usually playing himself. He remained active until his death in 2021. His awards and nominations include two Peabodys, an Emmy, and ten Cable ACE Awards. King was also awarded a Lifetime Achievement Award at the 32nd Annual News and Documentary Emmys.

== Early life and education ==
King was born Lawrence Harvey Zeiger on November 19, 1933, in Brooklyn, New York. His parents were Orthodox Jews who immigrated to the United States from Soviet Belarus in the 1920s. He was one of two sons of Jennie (née Gitlitz), a garment worker who was born in Minsk in the Russian Empire in present-day Belarus, and Aaron Edward Zeiger, a restaurant owner and defense-plant worker who was born in Pinsk (also in modern-day Belarus). During his early childhood, the family lived in a rowhouse in a section of the borough alternatively characterized as part of Bedford–Stuyvesant, Brooklyn, Brownsville or Ocean Hill.

King attended Lafayette High School, a public high school in Brooklyn. When he was nine years old, his father died of a heart attack. This resulted in his family receiving government assistance. Greatly affected by his father's death, King lost interest in his schoolwork. Throughout King's adolescence, his family lived in the Bensonhurst section of Brooklyn.

After graduating from high school, King worked to help support his mother. From an early age, he desired to work in radio broadcasting.

== Career ==
=== Miami radio and television ===
A CBS production supervisor, James F. Sirmons, suggested he go to Florida, which was a growing media market with openings for inexperienced broadcasters. King went to Miami. After initial setbacks, he gained his first job in radio at a small station, WAHR (now WMBM), in Miami Beach, hired him to clean up and perform miscellaneous tasks. When one of the station's announcers abruptly quit, King was put on the air. His first broadcast was on May 1, 1957, working as the disc jockey from 9 a.m. to noon. He also did two afternoon newscasts and a sportscast. He was paid $50 a week.

He acquired the name Larry King when the general manager declared that Zeiger was too difficult to remember, saying it was "too German, too Jewish and not showbusiness enough". Minutes before airtime, Larry chose the surname "King", which was inspired from a Miami Herald advertisement he saw for King's Wholesale Liquor. Within two years, he legally changed his name to Larry King.

King began to conduct interviews on a mid-morning show for WIOD from Pumpernik's Restaurant in Miami Beach. He would interview whomever walked in. His first interview was with a waiter at the restaurant.

Two days later, singer Bobby Darin, in Miami for a concert that evening, walked into Pumpernik's having heard King's radio show; Darin became King's first celebrity interview guest.

King's Miami radio show brought him local attention. A few years later, in May 1960, he hosted Miami Undercover, airing Sunday nights at 11:30 p.m. on Miami television station WPST-TV.

King credited his success on local television to the assistance of comedian Jackie Gleason, whose national television variety show was being taped in Miami Beach, beginning in 1964. "That show really took off because Gleason came to Miami," King said in a 1996 interview he gave when inducted into the Broadcasters' Hall of Fame. "He did that show and stayed all night with me. We stayed till five in the morning. He didn't like the set, so we broke into the general manager's office and changed the set. Gleason changed the set, he changed the lighting, and he became like a mentor of mine."

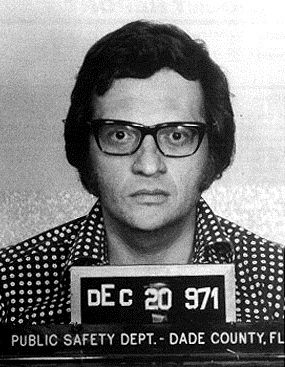
Grand larceny mug shot, December 1971, Dade County, Florida

During this period, WIOD gave King further exposure as a color commentator for the Miami Dolphins of the National Football League, during their 1970 season and most of their 1971 season.

On December 20, 1971, he was dismissed by both WIOD and television station WTVJ as a late-night radio host and sports commentator following his arrest for grand larceny by a former business partner, Louis Wolfson. Other staff covered the Dolphins' games into their 24–3 loss to the Dallas Cowboys in Super Bowl VI. King also lost his weekly column at the Miami Beach Sun newspaper. The charges were later dropped. King was later rehired by WIOD. For several years during the 1970s, he hosted a sports talk-show called Sports-a-la-King, featuring guests and callers.

=== The Larry King Show ===
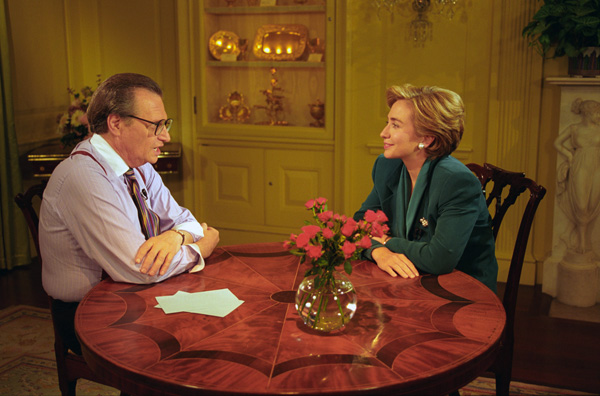
King interviewing Hillary Clinton in the White House in 1993

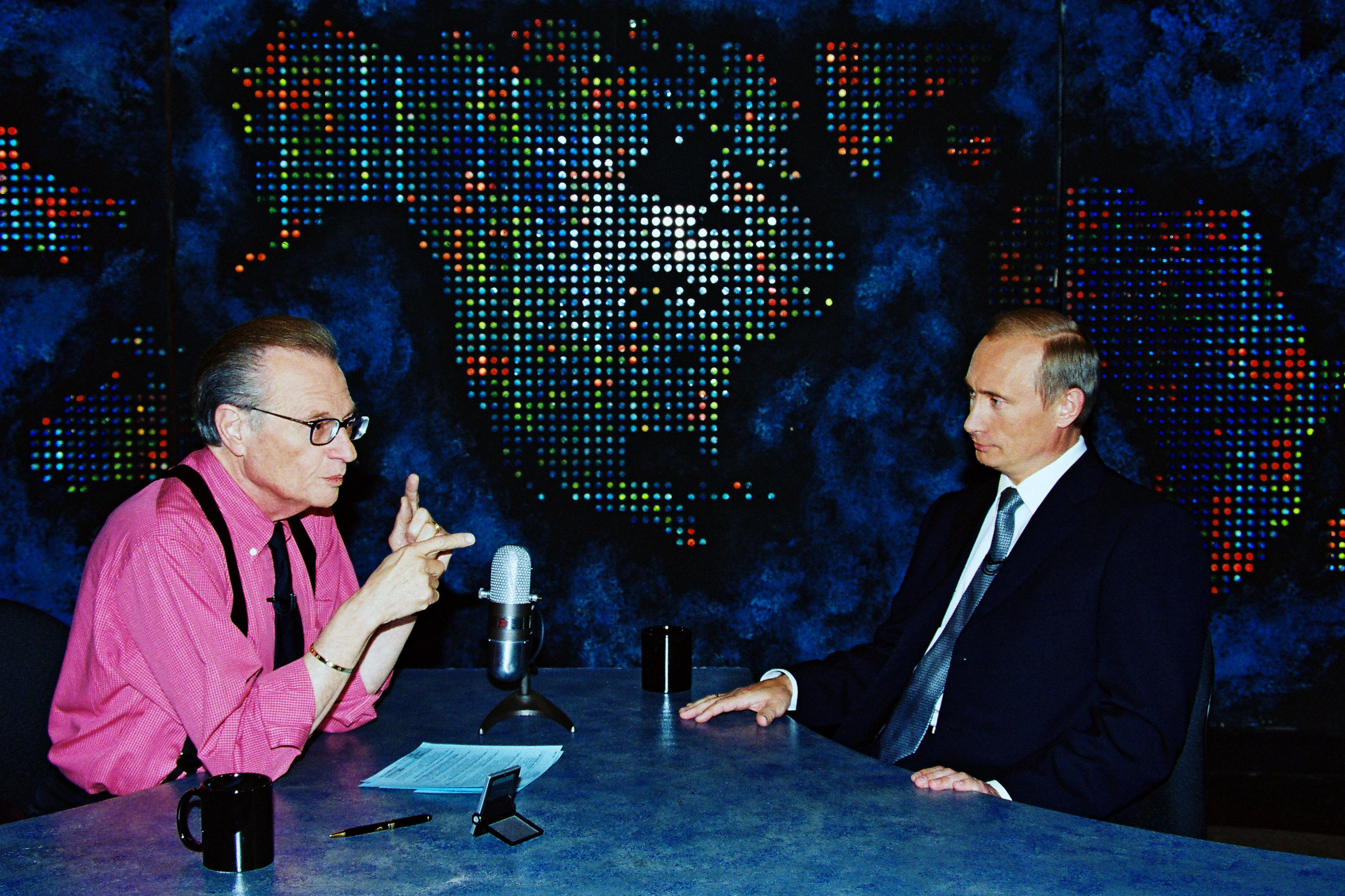
King interviewing Vladimir Putin in 2000

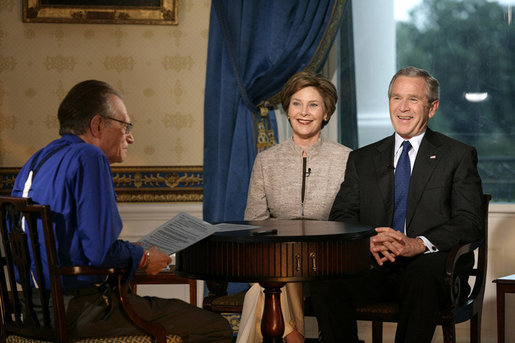
King interviewing President George W. Bush and First Lady Laura Bush in 2006

On January 30, 1978, King began hosting a nightly coast-to-coast radio program on the Mutual Broadcasting System, inheriting the talk show slot that had begun with Herb Jepko in late 1975, then followed by "Long John" Nebel in 1977. King's Mutual show rapidly developed a devoted audience, called "King-aholics".

The Larry King Show was broadcast live Monday through Friday from midnight to 5:30 a.m. Eastern Time. King would interview a guest for the first hour, with callers asking questions that continued the interview for the next two hours. At 3 a.m., the Open Phone America segment began, where he allowed callers to discuss any topic they pleased with him, until the end of the program when he expressed his own political opinions. Many stations in the western time zones carried the Open Phone America portion of the show live, followed by the guest interview on tape delay.

Some of King's regular callers used pseudonyms or were given nicknames by King, such as "The Numbers Guy", "The Chair", "The Portland Laugher", "The Miami Derelict", and "The Scandal Scooper". At the beginning, the show had 28 affiliates, but eventually rose to over 500. King occasionally entertained the audience by telling amusing stories from his youth or early broadcasting career.

Wishing to reduce his workload, King began hosting a shorter, daytime version of the show in 1993. Jim Bohannon, King's primary fill-in host, took over the late night time slot. After 16 years on Mutual, King decided to retire from the program. The final broadcast of The Larry King Show was heard on May 27, 1994; Mutual gave King's afternoon slot to David Brenner and Mutual's affiliates were given the option of carrying the audio of King's new CNN evening television program. After Westwood One dissolved Mutual in 1999, the radio simulcast of the CNN show continued until December 31, 2009.

=== Larry King Live ===
Larry King Live began on CNN in June 1985. King hosted a broad range of guests, from figures such as UFO conspiracy theorists and alleged psychics, to prominent politicians and entertainment industry figures, often giving their first or only interview on breaking news stories on his show. After broadcasting his CNN show from 9 to 10 p.m., King then traveled to the studios of the Mutual Broadcasting System to do his radio show, when both shows still aired.

Two of his major interviews involved political figures. In 1992, billionaire Ross Perot announced his presidential bid on the show. In 1993, a debate between Al Gore and Perot became CNN's most-watched segment until 2015.

Unlike many interviewers, King had a direct, non-confrontational approach. His reputation for asking easy, open-ended questions made him attractive to important figures who wanted to state their position while avoiding being challenged on contentious topics. King said that when interviewing authors, he did not read their books in advance, so that he would not know more than his audience. Throughout his career, King interviewed many of the leading figures of his time. According to CNN, King conducted more than 30,000 interviews in his career.

An avid sports fan, King wrote a regular column for The Sporting News during the 1980s. King also wrote a regular column in USA Today for almost 20 years, from shortly after that first national newspaper's debut in Baltimore–Washington in 1982 until September 2001. The column consisted of short "plugs, superlatives and dropped names" but was dropped when the newspaper redesigned its "Life" section. The column was resurrected in blog form in November 2008 and on Twitter in April 2009.

During his career, King conducted more than 60,000 interviews. CNN's Larry King Live became "the longest-running television show hosted by the same person, on the same network and in the same time slot", and was recognized for it by the Guinness Book of World Records. He retired in 2010 after taping 6,000 episodes of the show.

==== Departure ====
On June 29, 2010, King announced that after 25 years, he would be stepping down as the show's host. However, he stated that he would remain with CNN to host occasional specials. The announcement came in the wake of speculation that CNN had approached Piers Morgan, the British television personality and journalist, as King's primetime replacement, which was confirmed that September.

The final edition of Larry King Live aired on December 16, 2010. The show concluded with his last thoughts and a thank you to his audience for watching and supporting him over the years. The concluding words of Larry King on the show were, "I... I, I don't know what to say except to you, my audience, thank you. And instead of goodbye, how about so long."

On February 17, 2012, CNN announced that he would no longer host specials.

=== Shows on Ora TV ===
In March 2012, King co-founded Ora TV, a production company, with his wife Shawn Southwick-King and Mexican business magnate Carlos Slim. On January 16, 2013, Ora TV celebrated their 100th episode of Larry King Now. In September 2017, King's agent stated that King "looks forward to working for another 60 years."

Ora TV signed a multi-year deal with Hulu to exclusively carry King's new talk-oriented web series, Larry King Now, beginning July 17. On October 23, 2012, King hosted the third-party presidential debate on Ora TV, featuring Jill Stein, Rocky Anderson, Virgil Goode, and Gary Johnson.

In May 2013, the Russian government-owned RT America network announced that they struck a deal with Ora TV to host the Larry King Now show on its network. King said in an advertisement on RT America: "I would rather ask questions to people in positions of power, instead of speaking on their behalf." The show continued to be available on Hulu.com and Ora.tv.

When criticized for doing business with a Russian-owned TV network in 2014, King responded, "I don't work for RT", commenting that his podcasts, Larry King Now and Politicking, are licensed for a fee to RT America by New York-based Ora TV. "It's a deal made between the companies ... They just license our shows. If they took something out, I would never do it. It would be bad if they tried to edit out things. I wouldn't put up with it."

=== Other ventures ===
King remained active as a writer and television personality thereafter.

King guest starred in episodes of Arthur, 30 Rock and Gravity Falls, had cameos in Ghostbusters and Bee Movie, and voiced Doris the Ugly Stepsister in Shrek 2 and its sequels. He also played himself in The People v. O. J. Simpson: American Crime Story and appeared as himself in an episode of Law and Order: Trial by Jury.

King hosted the educational television series In View with Larry King from 2013 to 2015, which was carried on cable television networks including Fox Business Network and Discovery and produced by The Profiles Series production company.

King and his wife Shawn appeared on WWE Raw in October 2012, participating in a storyline involving professional wrestlers The Miz and Kofi Kingston.

King became a very active user on the social-networking site Twitter, where he posted thoughts and commented on a wide variety of subjects. King stated, "I love tweeting, I think it's a different world we've entered. When people were calling in, they were calling into the show and now on Twitter, I'm giving out thoughts, opinions. The whole concept has changed."

After 2011, he also made various television infomercials, often appearing as a "host" discussing products like omega-3 fatty acid dietary supplement OmegaXL with guests, in an interview style reminiscent of his past television programs.

ProPublica reported that in 2019 King had been manipulated into starring in a fake interview with a Russian journalist containing disinformation about Chinese dissident Guo Wengui, which was subsequently spread by Chinese government associated social media accounts.

== Charitable works ==
Following his 1987 heart attack, King founded the Larry King Cardiac Foundation, a non-profit organization which paid for life-saving cardiac procedures for people who otherwise would not be able to afford them.

On August 30, 2010, King served as the host of Chabad's 30th annual "To Life" telethon, in Los Angeles.

He donated to the Beverly Hills 9/11 Memorial Garden, where his name is on the monument.

== Personal life ==
King resided in Beverly Hills, California. A lifelong Brooklyn / Los Angeles Dodgers fan, he was frequently seen behind home plate at the team's games. He was part of an investment group that attempted to bring a Major League Baseball franchise to Buffalo, New York, in 1990. He lost $2.8 million to Bernie Madoff.

In a June 2018 interview with Pete Holmes on his "You Made it Weird" podcast, King admits he lost his virginity at 18 years old in the Catskills / Borscht Belt, during a summer where he worked as a busboy. The woman was married and stayed at the resort all week, with her husband coming up on weekends (what was referred to as a "bungalow bunny" in the film Dirty Dancing). She would make eyes at him while he served her, and they "made love on the baseball field at night."

In 2009, 2011, and several times in 2015, King said that he would like to be cryonically suspended. He discussed the issue with his family two years before his death, and "after much consideration," he decided that he did not want to undergo the procedure.

In the early 1980s, King took human growth hormone daily.

After describing himself as a Jewish agnostic in 2005, he stated that he was fully atheist in 2015. In 2017, he told The Jerusalem Post, "I love being Jewish, am proud of my Jewishness, and I love Israel".

In 2019, King sued Nate Holzapfel, a Shark Tank contestant and entrepreneur, alleging that he had misrepresented himself and his reasons for filming a short interview with King. The interview had been edited without King's permission to make it appear that Holzapfel had appeared on Larry King Now. A default judgment was entered in King's favor, and he was awarded fees and $250,000 in damages.

=== Marriages and children ===
King was married eight times to seven women.

King married high school sweetheart Freda Miller in 1952, at the age of 19. That union ended the following year at the behest of their parents, who reportedly had the marriage annulled.

King was married to Annette Kaye, who gave birth to a son in November 1961; King did not meet him until the son was in his 30s.

In 1961, King married his third wife, Playboy Bunny Alene Akins, at one of the magazine's eponymous nightclubs. He adopted Akins' son in 1962; the couple divorced the following year.

In 1963, King married his fourth wife, Mary Francis "Mickey" Sutphin, who divorced him in 1967.

King remarried Akins in 1969; the couple had a daughter before divorcing again in 1972. In 1997, Dove Books published a book written by King and Chaia, Daddy Day, Daughter Day. Aimed at young children, it tells each of their accounts of his divorce from Akins.

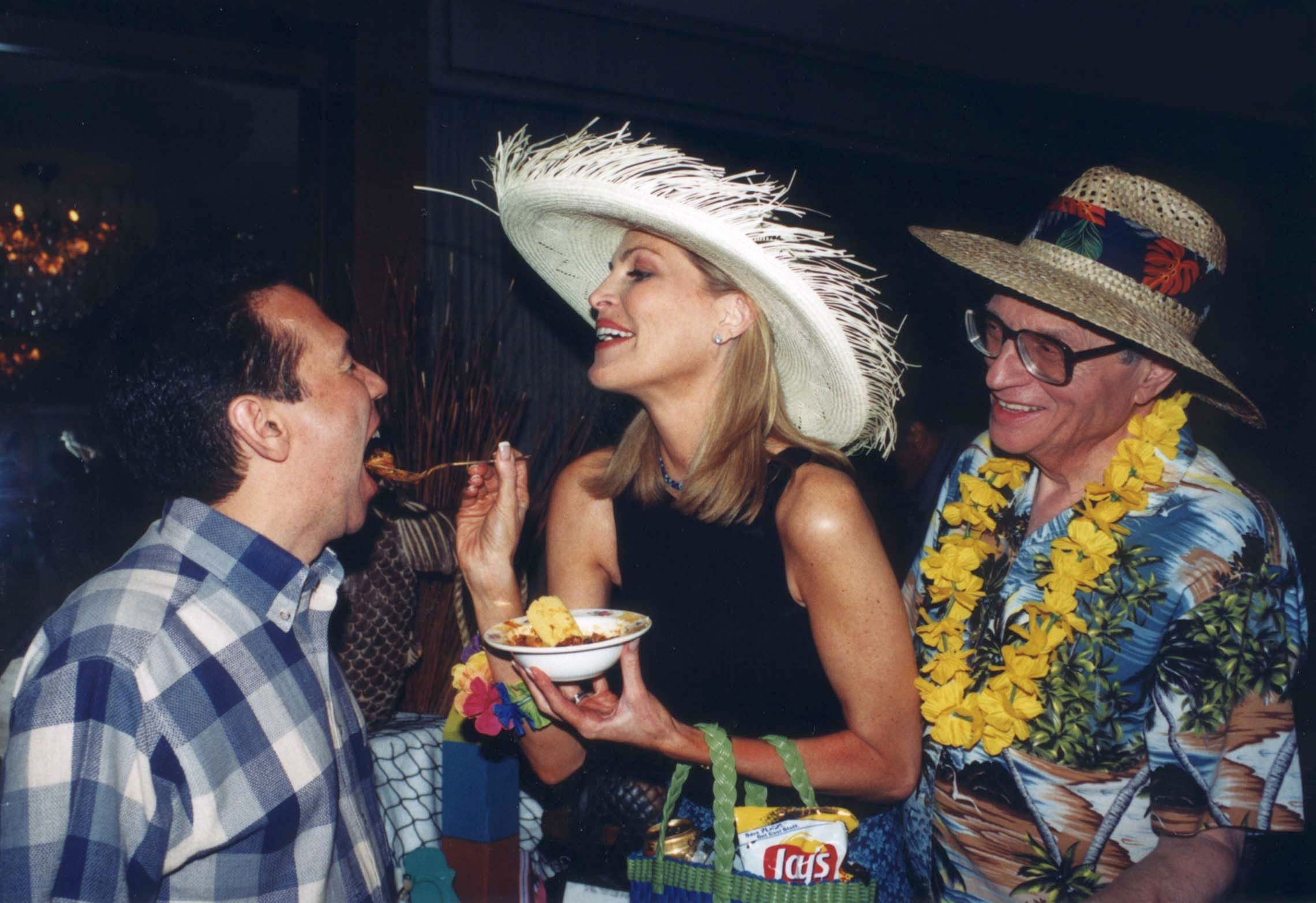
Comedian Gilbert Gottfried fed by King's seventh wife, Shawn Southwick, in 1999

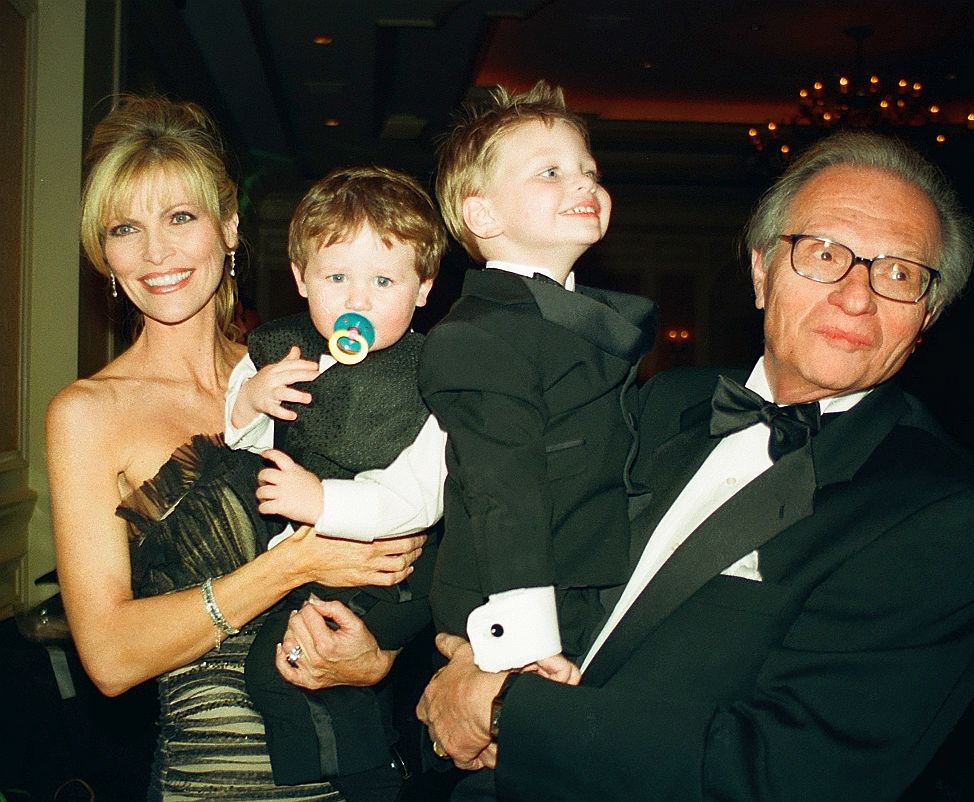
King with Southwick and their children, Chance and Cannon, in 2002

On September 25, 1976, King married his fifth wife, mathematics teacher and production assistant Sharon Lepore. The couple divorced in 1983.

On August 1, 1989, King proposed to businesswoman Julie Alexander on their first date. Alexander became King's sixth wife on October 7, 1989, when the two were married in Washington, D.C. They lived in different cities, with Alexander in Philadelphia and King in Washington, D.C., where he worked. The couple separated in 1990 and divorced in 1992.

King became engaged to actress Deanna Lund in 1995 after five weeks of dating, but they did not marry.

In 1997, King married his seventh wife, Shawn Southwick (née Engemann), a singer, actress, and TV host who is the sister of musician Paul Engemann. The couple wed in King's Los Angeles hospital room three days before he underwent heart surgery to clear an occluded blood vessel. The couple had two children, in March 1999 and May 2000. King was stepfather to Arena Football League quarterback Danny Southwick. On King and Southwick's 10th anniversary in September 2007, Southwick joked that she was "the only [wife] to have lasted into the two digits". The couple filed for divorce in 2010, but later reconciled only to file for divorce again on August 20, 2019. King and Southwick were estranged and going through divorce proceedings at the time of King's death in 2021.

At the time of his death, King had five children, nine grandchildren, and four great-grandchildren. His children with Alene Akins died within weeks of each other in August 2020.

=== Estate ===
At the time of his death, in February 2021, it was reported that his estranged wife Shawn Southwick had gone to court to contest King's 2019 handwritten will, which had left his estate (valued at $2 million) to his five surviving children. Southwick alleged that her stepson, Larry King Jr., exerted undue influence over his father towards the end of his life, and that the handwritten will conflicted with a will King signed in 2015 in which Southwick was named executor of his estate. This does not include more valuable "assets that were held in trusts". Southwick ultimately reached a settlement with King's business management firm, Blouin & Company, and its executives in court in 2024.

== Health problems and death ==
On February 24, 1987, King suffered a major heart attack and underwent a successful emergency quintuple-bypass surgery. Following this, he wrote two books about living with heart disease. Mr. King, You're Having a Heart Attack: How a Heart Attack and Bypass Surgery Changed My Life (1989, ISBN 978-0-440-50039-1), which was written with New York's Newsday science editor B. D. Colen, and Taking On Heart Disease: Famous Personalities Recall How They Triumphed over the Nation's #1 Killer and How You Can, Too (2004, ISBN 978-1-57954-820-9), which features the experience of various celebrities with cardiovascular disease, including Peggy Fleming and Regis Philbin. King quit smoking after he had the heart attack, having smoked three packs of cigarettes a day until then.

King related his heart attack experience in an interview in the 2014 British documentary film The Widowmaker, which advocates for coronary calcium scanning to motivate preventive cardiology and highlights the financial conflicts of interest in the widespread use of coronary stents. He received annual chest X-rays to monitor his heart condition. During his 2017 examination, doctors discovered a malignant tumor in his lung. It was then successfully removed with surgery.

On April 23, 2019, King underwent a scheduled angioplasty and also had stents inserted. It was erroneously reported that he had another heart attack along with heart failure; these claims were later retracted. He returned to Politicking with Larry King on August 15 of the same year. On November 27 of the same year, King said he had suffered a stroke in March, and was in a coma "for weeks". Later, King admitted that he had contemplated suicide following a stroke, telling Los Angeles television station KTLA, "I thought I was just going to bite the bullet. I didn't want to live this way."

On January 2, 2021, it was reported that King had been admitted to the Cedars-Sinai Medical Center in Los Angeles due to severe COVID-19 infection, but had moved out of the ICU. Having survived the virus, three weeks later on January 23 at the age of 87, King died of sepsis. His estranged wife, Shawn Southwick-King, told Entertainment Tonight his sepsis was allegedly unrelated to COVID-19.

== Filmography ==
=== Film ===
Year	Title	Role	Notes
1984	Ghostbusters	Himself	
1985	Lost in America	Himself	Voice
1989	Eddie and the Cruisers II: Eddie Lives!	Talk show host	
1990	Crazy People	Himself	
1990	The Exorcist III	Himself	
1993	Dave	Himself	
1993	We're Back! A Dinosaur's Story	Himself	Voice
1995	Open Season	Himself	
1996	The Long Kiss Goodnight	Himself	
1997	Contact	Himself	
1997	Mad City	Himself	
1997	The Jackal	Himself	
1998	Primary Colors	Himself	
1998	Bulworth	Himself	
1998	Enemy of the State	Himself	
2000	The Contender	Himself	
2000	The Kid	Himself	
2001	America's Sweethearts	Himself	
2002	John Q	Himself	
2004	The Stepford Wives	Himself	
2004	Shrek 2	Doris	Voice (American version)
2006	A Little Thing Called Murder	Doris	Himself
2007	Shrek the Third	Voice	
2007	Bee Movie	Bee Larry King	Voice (Cameo)
2008	Swing Vote	Himself	
2010	Shrek Forever After	Doris	Voice (cameo)
2012	The Dictator	Himself	
2013	The Power of Few	Himself	
2015	Chloe & Theo	Himself	
2015	Dude Bro Party Massacre III	Coach Handsey	
2017	American Satan	Himself	

=== Television ===
Year	Title	Role	Notes
1961	Miami Undercover	Sleepy Sam	Episode: The Thrush
1985–2010	Larry King Live	Self; Host	6,076 Episodes
1990–96	Murphy Brown	Himself	2 episodes
1991–94	The Simpsons	Himself	Voice; 2 episodes
1995	The Larry Sanders Show	Himself	Episode: The P.A.
1995	Coach	Himself	Episode: Is it Hot in Here or is it Just Me?
1996	Murder One	Himself	Episode: Chapter Twenty-One
1996	Bonnie	Himself	Episode: Better Offer
1997	Spin City	Himself	Episode: An Affair to Remember
1997	Frasier	Himself	Episode: My Fair Frasier
2002	The Practice	Himself	Episode: The Verdict
2002	Arli$$	Himself	Episode: Standards and Practice
2002	Arthur	Himself	Episode: Elwood City Turns 100!
2004	Sesame Street	Himself	Episode: 4074
2005	Boston Legal	Himself	Episode: Truly, Madly, Deeply
2005	Law & Order: Trial by Jury	Himself	Episode: Day
2006	Law & Order: Criminal Intent	Himself	Episode: Weeping Willow
2007	Shark	Himself	Episode: Wayne's World 2: Revenge of the Shark
2007	The Closer	Himself	Episode: Til Death do Us Part - Part II
2008	Ugly Betty	Himself	Episode: The Kids Are Alright
2009	30 Rock	Himself	Episode: Larry King
2011	Take Two with Phineas and Ferb	Himself	Episode: Larry King
2012–16	Gravity Falls	Wax Larry King	2 episodes
2013	1600 Penn	Himself	Episode: Marry Me, Baby
2014	Murder in the First	Himself	Episode: Family Matters
2016	The People v. O.J. Simpson	Himself	4 episodes

== Awards and nominations ==
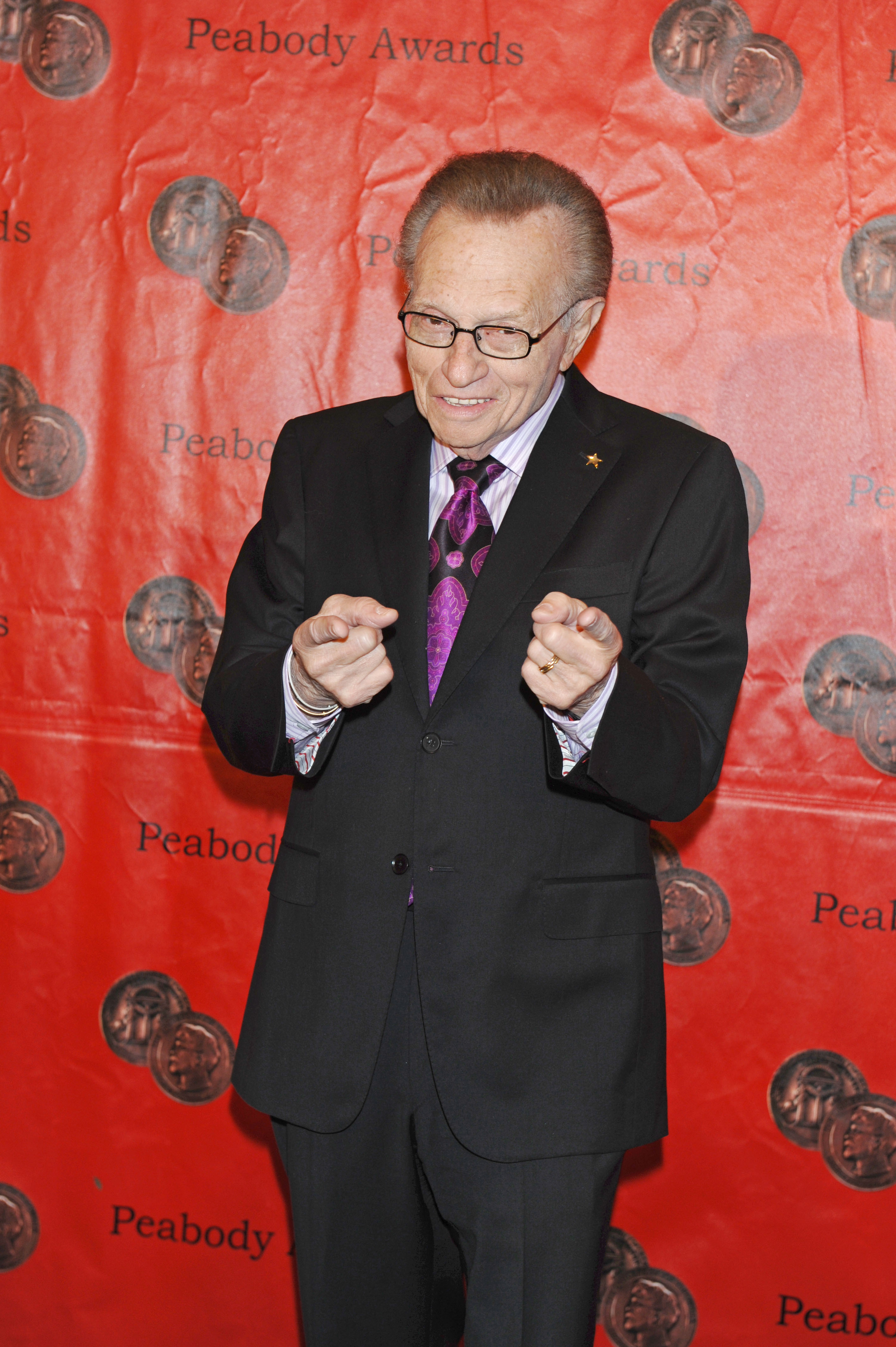
King at the 70th Annual Peabody Awards, May 2011

King received many broadcasting awards. He won the Peabody Award for Excellence in broadcasting for both his radio (1982) and television (1992) shows. He also won 10 CableACE Awards for Best Interviewer and for Best Talk Show Series.

In 1989, King was inducted into the Radio Hall of Fame, and in 1992 to the NAB Broadcasters' Hall of Fame. In 2002, the industry publication Talkers Magazine named King both the fourth-greatest radio talk show host of all time and the top television talk show host of all time.

King received a State of California recognition and Proclamation by Gov. Arnold Schwarzenegger for Larry King Day on the evening of the final episode of Larry King Live, broadcast at CNN Los Angeles, CA on December 16, 2025.

In 1994, King received the Scopus Award from the American Friends of Hebrew University. In 1996, he received the Golden Plate Award of the American Academy of Achievement presented by Awards Council member Art Buchwald.

On May 8, 1997, Larry King was given a Star on the Hollywood Walk of Fame at 6616 Hollywood Blvd Hollywood, CA.

He was given the Golden Mike Award for Lifetime Achievement in January 2008, by the Radio & Television News Association of Southern California.

King was an honorary member of the Rotary Club of Beverly Hills. He was also a recipient of the President's Award honoring his impact on media from the Los Angeles Press Club in 2006.

King was the first recipient of the Arizona State University Hugh Downs Award for Communication Excellence, presented April 11, 2007, via satellite by Downs himself.

In 2012, King was inducted into the Cable Hall of Fame at the Syndeo Institute at the Cable Center.

King was awarded an honorary degree of Doctor of Humane Letters by Bradley University; which he said "is really a hoot". King received numerous honorary degrees from George Washington University, the Columbia School of Medicine, Brooklyn College, the New England Institute of Technology, and the Pratt Institute.

== See also ==
- List of atheists in film, radio, television and theater
