= Simon Sinek =

American author and speaker (born 1973)

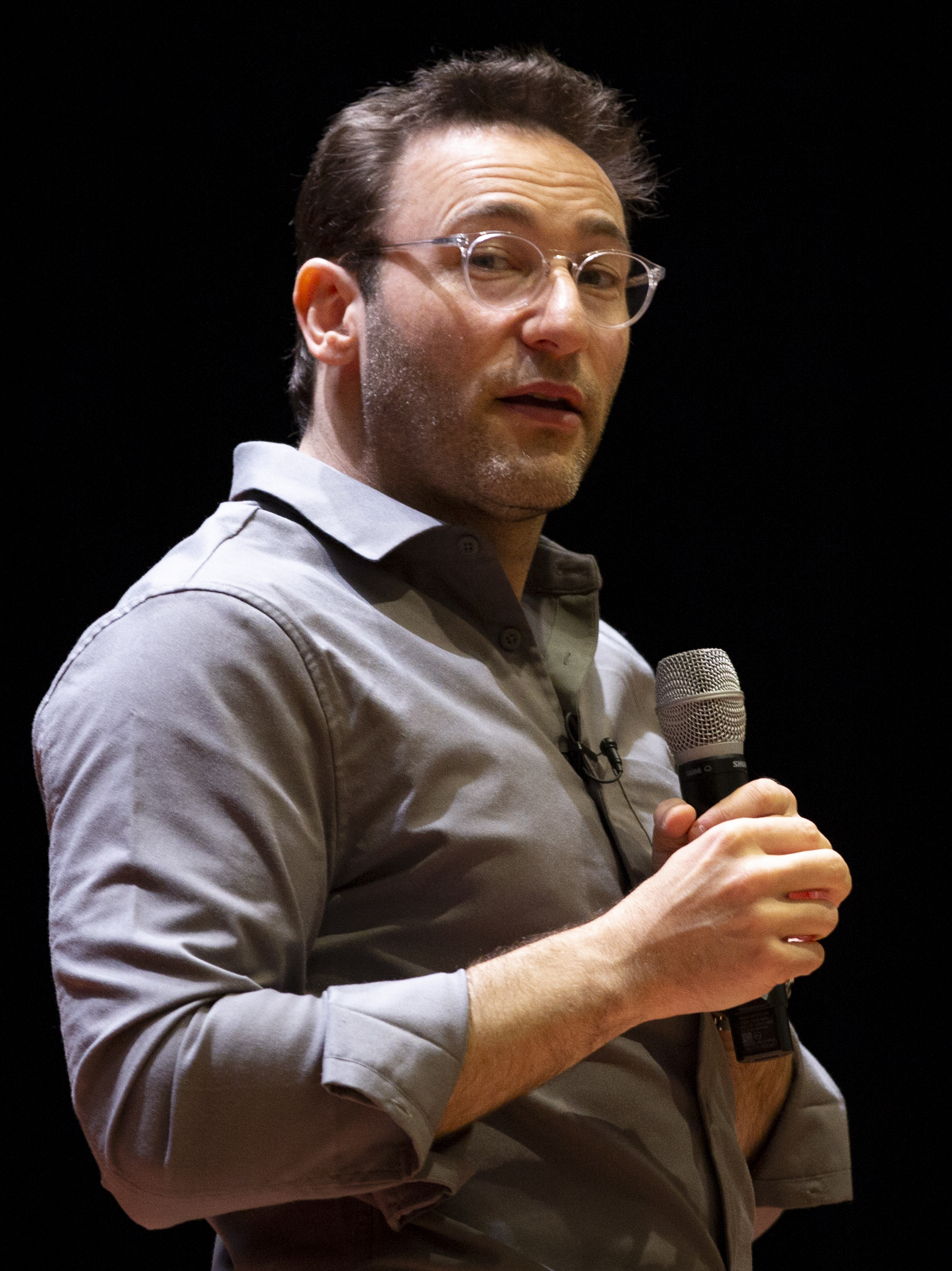
- Sinek in 2020
- Born: Simon Oliver Sinek; October 9, 1973 (age 52); Wimbledon, London, England
- Education: Brandeis University; City, University of London
- Occupations: Motivational speaker, author
- Writing career
- Notable works: Start With Why; The Infinite Game
- Website: simonsinek.com

Simon Oliver Sinek (born 9 October 1973) is an author and inspirational speaker on business leadership. His books include Start with Why (2009) and The Infinite Game (2019).

== Early life and education ==
Sinek was born in Wimbledon on 9 October 1973. His mother is of Hungarian Jewish descent. As a child, he lived in Johannesburg, London, and Hong Kong before his family settled in the United States. He graduated in 1991 from Northern Valley Regional High School at Demarest in Bergen County, New Jersey and earned a BA in cultural anthropology from Brandeis University, then studied law at City, University of London.

== Career ==
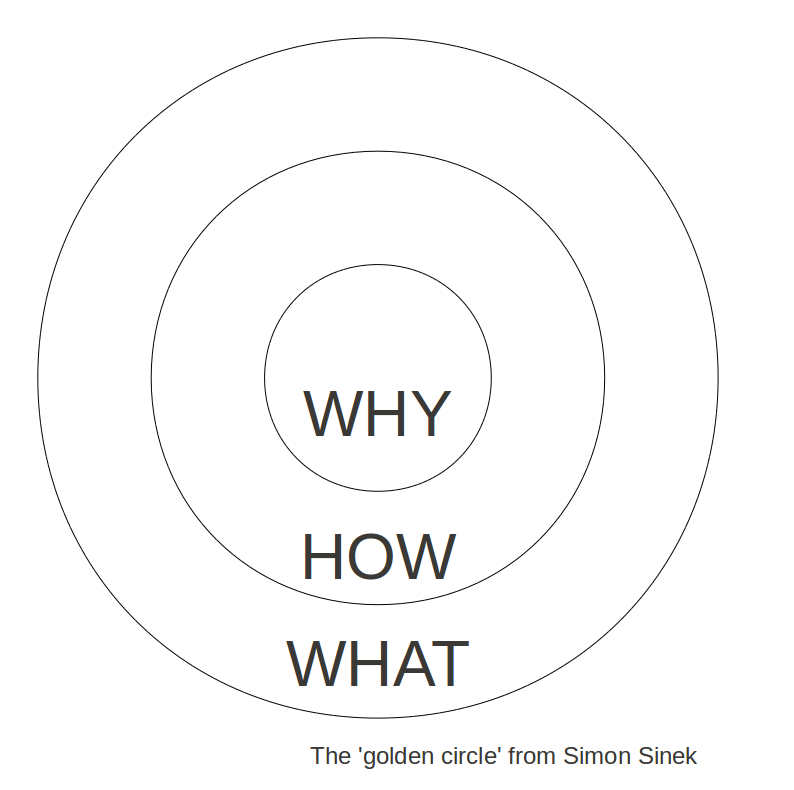
The "golden circle" from Sinek's Start with Why, a perspective on the influence of successful leaders and organizations

Sinek began his career at the New York ad agencies Euro RSCG and Ogilvy & Mather, then launched his own business, Sinek Partners.

Simon defines himself as an "optimist". As a motivational speaker, Sinek has spoken at the UN Global Compact Leaders Summit in 2016, and at TEDx conferences several times, beginning in 2009. His 2010 "How Great Leaders Inspire Action", arising out of his first book, Start with Why, is one of the most-viewed TED talks, and his following book, Leaders Eat Last, appeared on the bestseller lists of the Wall Street Journal and The New York Times.

In June 2018, The Young Turks reported a $98,000 no-bid contract from U.S. Immigration and Customs Enforcement for leadership training by Sinek, which was provided by Ernst & Young. Sinek has also been an instructor of strategic communications at Columbia University, and an adjunct staff member of the RAND Corporation.

In November 2018, Publishers Weekly reported that Sinek would start Optimism Press, a new imprint of Penguin Random House. He subsequently launched The Optimism Company, a digital learning platform.

== Publications ==
Sinek has published five books:

- Start with Why: How Great Leaders Inspire Everyone to Take Action. New York: Portfolio/Penguin, 2009. ISBN 978-1591846444.
- Leaders Eat Last: Why Some Teams Pull Together and Others Don't. New York: Portfolio/Penguin, 2014. ISBN 978-1591845324.
- Together Is Better: A Little Book of Inspiration. New York: Portfolio/Penguin, 2016. ISBN 978-1591847854.
- Find Your Why: A Practical Guide for Discovering Purpose for You and Your Team. New York: Portfolio/Penguin, 2017. ISBN 9781101992982.
- The Infinite Game. New York: Portfolio/Penguin, 2019. ISBN 9780735213500.
