= Brendon Burchard =

American author, video maker and trainer

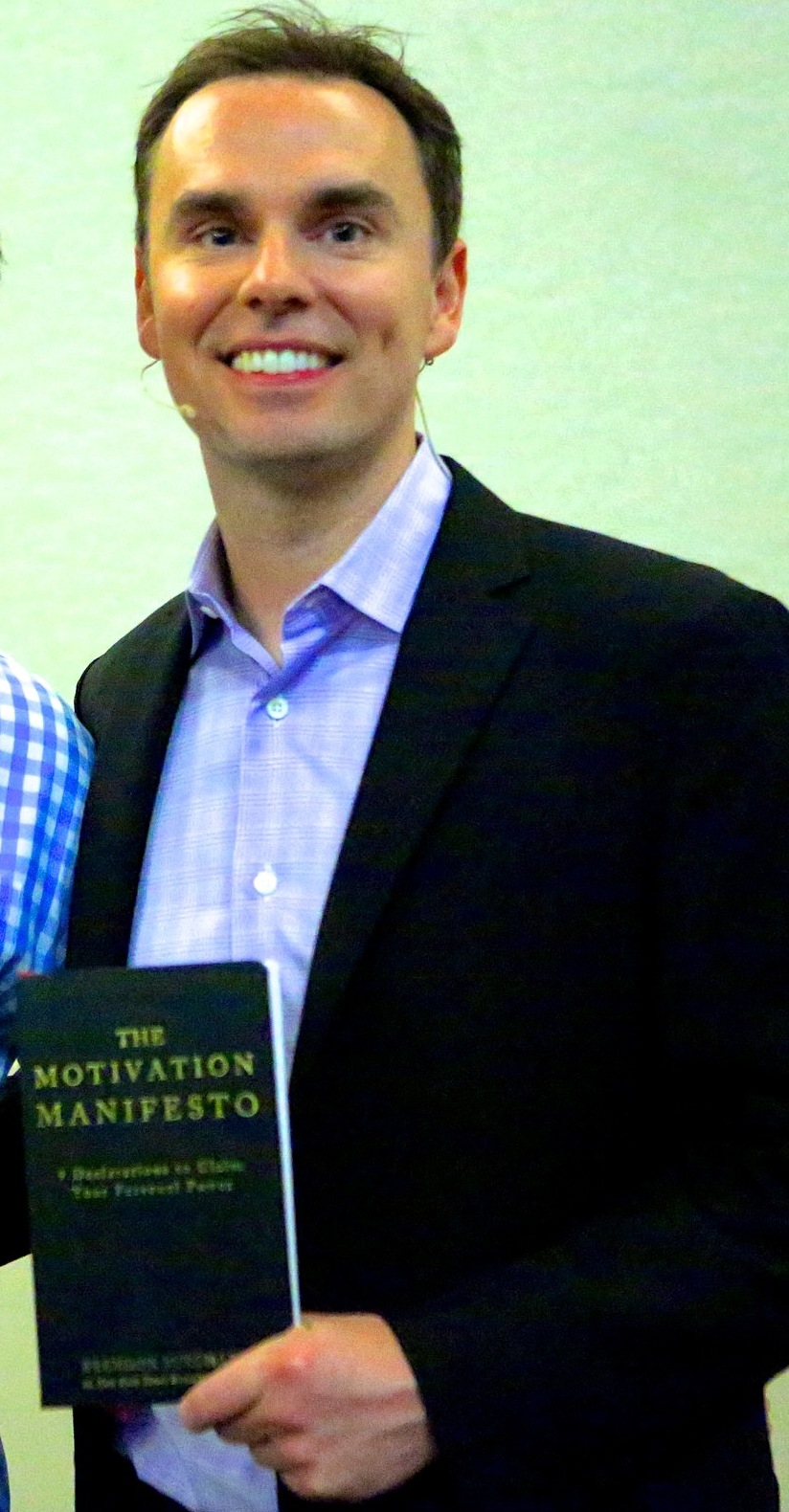
- Burchard with Motivation Manifesto in 2014
- Born: February 28, 1977 (age 49); Montana
- Occupations: Writer, High Performance Coach, Motivational Speaker
- Writing career
- Genre: Nonfiction
- Notable works: The Motivation Manifesto, High Performance Habits, The Millionaire Messenger

Brendon Burchard (born February 28, 1977) is an author, high performance coach and motivational speaker.

== Career ==
Burchard is the founder of the Experts Academy and the High Performance Academy. The aim of both training programs is provide students with Burchard's lessons in business, entrepreneurship, psychology, productivity, and persuasion.

Burchard cites surviving a car accident at age 19 as the inspiration for his core teaching questions: "Did I live? Did I love? Did I matter?" A video sharing his story has garnered over 27 million views.

Burchard is the author of several books. His first, Life's Golden Ticket: An Inspirational Novel, was published in 2008. His second book, The Millionaire Messenger (2011), reached #1 on The New York Times Best Seller list for paperback advice books, as well as The Wall Street Journal, USA Today, and Amazon bestseller lists.

In 2012, his third book, The Charge: Activating the 10 Human Drives That Make You Feel Alive reached #1 on The Wall Street Journal bestseller list.

In 2014, The Motivation Manifesto spent 32 weeks on The New York Times bestseller list.

In 2016, Burchard was named a member of Oprah Winfrey Network's Super Soul 100.

In 2017, High Performance Habits became a Wall Street Journal bestseller and was #2 on Amazon's "Best business and leadership books of 2017" list.

== Bibliography ==
- Life's Golden Ticket: An Inspirational Novel (2008) ISBN 0061173916
- The Millionaire Messenger (2011) ISBN 1451665997
- The Charge: Activating the 10 Human Drives that Make You Feel Alive (2012) ISBN 1451667531
- The Motivation Manifesto: 9 Declarations to Claim Your Personal Power (2014)
- High Performance Habits: How Extraordinary People Become That Way (2017)
