= James P. Carse =

American academic (1932–2020)

- Born: December 24, 1932; Mansfield, Ohio, United States
- Died: September 25, 2020 (aged 87)

Philosophical work
- Era: 20th/21st-century philosophy
- Region: Western Philosophy
- Main interests: Religion, Metaphysics, Epistemology
- Notable ideas: Game theory, Ontology

James P. Carse (December 24, 1932 – September 25, 2020) was an American academic who was Professor Emeritus of history and literature of religion at New York University. His book Finite and Infinite Games was widely influential. He was religious "in the sense that I am endlessly fascinated with the unknowability of what it means to be human, to exist at all."

Carse's ideas on religion and belief were featured on the May 4, 2012 CBC Radio series Ideas titled After Atheism: New Perspectives on God and Religion, Part 4.

== Books ==
- Jonathan Edwards & The Visibility of God. Charles Scribner's Sons, 1967
- Death and Existence: A Conceptual History of Human Mortality 1980.
- The Silence of God: Meditations on Prayer (excerpt) 1985.
- Finite and Infinite Games. New York: Free Press ISBN 0-02-905980-1. 1986.
- Breakfast at the Victory 1994.
- The Gospel of the Beloved Disciple 1997.
- The Religious Case Against Belief. 2008. New York: The Penguin Press ISBN 978-1-59420-169-1
- PhDeath: The Puzzler Murders. 2016. New York. Opus Press 978-1-62316-066-1

== Audio Seminars ==
- Religious War In Light of the Infinite Game
- Carse on the Paula Gordon Show
