= Medical encyclopedia =

Written compendium about diseases

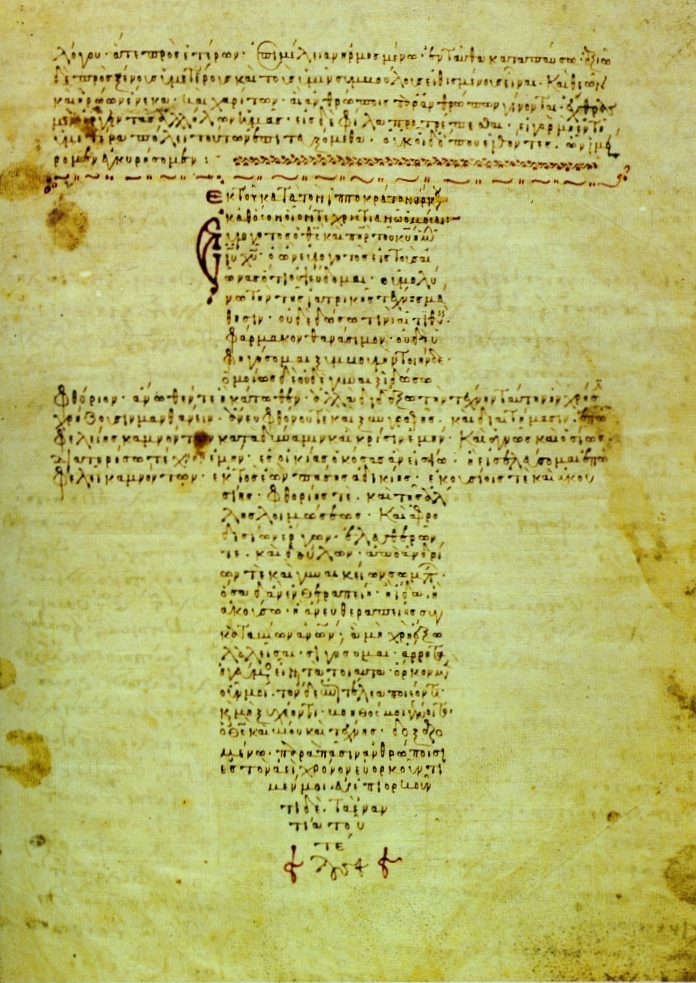
The Hippocratic Oath is an oath traditionally taken by physicians pertaining to the ethical practice of medicine. It is widely believed that the oath was written by Hippocrates, the father of western medicine, in the 4th century BC, or by one of his students

A medical encyclopaedia is a comprehensive written compendium that holds information about diseases, medical conditions, tests, symptoms, injuries, and surgeries. It may contain an extensive gallery of medicine-related photographs and illustrations. A medical encyclopaedia provides information to readers about health questions. It may also contain some information about the history of diseases, the development of medical technology uses to detect diseases in its early phase. A licensed physician should be consulted for diagnosis and treatment of any and all medical conditions.

== Characteristics ==
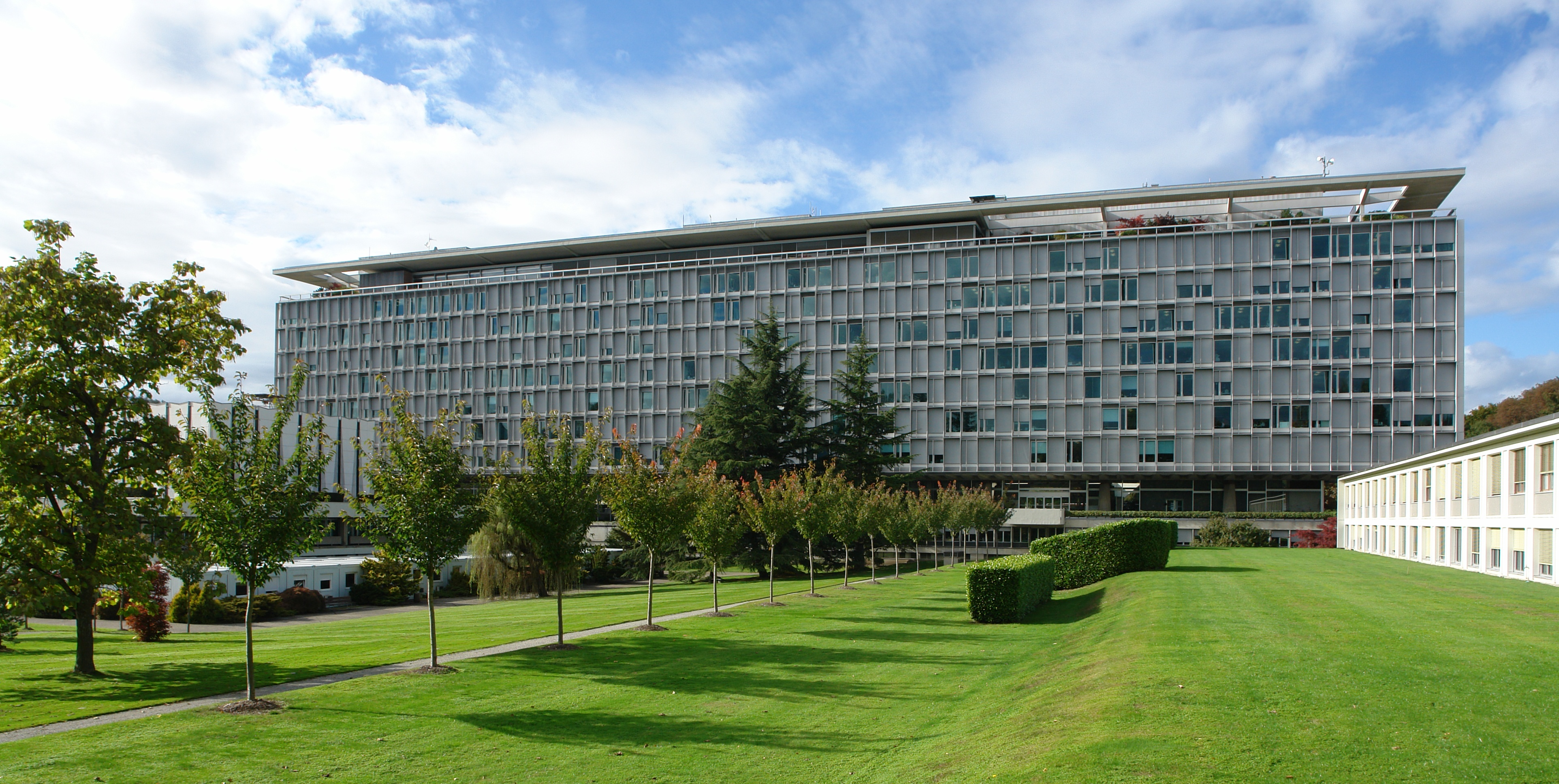
World Health Organization Headquarters in Geneva

Four major elements define a medical encyclopaedia: its subject matter, its scope, its method of organization, and its method of production:

- Encyclopaedias can be general, containing articles on topics in every field. A medical encyclopedia provides valuable health information, tools for managing your health, and support to those who seek information.
- Works of encyclopedic scope aim to convey the important accumulated knowledge for their subject domain, such as an encyclopaedia of medicine.
- The articles on subjects in a medical encyclopedia are usually accessed alphabetically by article name or for health topics.
- As modern multimedia and the information age have evolved, they have had an ever-increasing effect on the collection, verification, summation, and presentation of information of all kinds. Medical encyclopedias such as Medline Plus, WebMD, and the Merck Manual are examples of new forms of the medical encyclopedias as information retrieval becomes simpler. Some online encyclopedias are medical wikis, which use wiki software to write the information collaboratively.

== History ==
In the 12th century, the Jewish physician Ibn Jumay', who served as the personal doctor to Saladin, authored Kitāb al-Irshād li-Masāliḥ al-Anfus wa-al-Ajsād ("Guidance for the Welfare of Souls and Bodies"), a comprehensive medical encyclopedia.

== Listing of Medical Encyclopedias ==
=== A.D.A.M. Medical Encyclopedia (MedlinePlus) ===
A.D.A.M (Animated Dissection of Anatomy for Medicine) contains articles discussing diseases, tests, symptoms, injuries and surgeries. Content is reviewed by physicians; the goal is to present evidence-based health information. It also contains a library of medical photographs and illustrations. MedlinePlus is a free Web site that provides consumer health information for patients, families, and health care providers. MedlinePlus brings together information from the United States National Library of Medicine, the National Institutes of Health (NIH), other U.S. government agencies, and health-related organizations. The U.S. National Library of Medicine produces and maintains MedlinePlus.

=== WebMD ===
WebMD is an American provider of health information services. It is primarily known for its public Internet site, which has information regarding health and health care, including a symptom checklist, pharmacy information, blogs of physicians with specific topics and a place to store personal medical information. The site was reported to have received over 17.1 million average monthly unique visitors in Q1 2007 and is the leading health portal in the United States. The site receives information from accredited individuals and is reviewed by a medical review board consisting of four physicians to ensure accuracy.

Medscape is a professional portal for physicians with 30 medical specialty areas and over 30 physician discussion boards. Recently WebMD has been acquired by the News Corporation.

=== MedicineNet ===
MedicineNet, Inc. is owned and Operated by WebMD and part of the WebMD Network emphasizing non-technical, medical peer-reviewed information for consumers. Founded in 1996, WebMD acquired MedicineNet in 2004. MedicineNet, Inc.'s main office is in San Clemente, Calif., and the corporate office is in New York City.

== See also ==
- Pharmacopoeia, a list of medications and their properties
- Materia medica, an encyclopedia of medications
- List of medical wikis
- List of online encyclopedias
