= Jeff Arnold =

Jeff Arnold may refer to:

- Jeff Arnold (politician) (born 1967), American politician
- Jeff Arnold (Internet entrepreneur) (born 1969/70), American entrepreneur

== See also ==
- Geoff Arnold (born 1944), English cricketer
