= Michael Roizen =

American anesthesiologist and internist

Michael F. Roizen
- Born: January 7, 1946 (age 79)
- Citizenship: United States of America
- Education: BA, Williams College, 1967; MD, University of California, San Francisco
- Occupation(s): Physician, author
- Employer: Cleveland Clinic
- Known for: RealAge

Michael Fredric Roizen (born January 7, 1946) is an American anesthesiologist and internist, an award-winning author, and the chief wellness officer at the Cleveland Clinic. Roizen became famous for developing the RealAge concept and has authored or coauthored five number-one New York Times best sellers.

Roizen completed a tour of duty in the Public Health Service and has 165 peer reviewed publications and 100 medical chapters, 14 US patents, started six companies, served on Food and Drug Administration (FDA) advisory committees for 16 years, and chaired an FDA advisory committee. He also co-invented a drug, methylnaltrexone (MTNX, trade name Relistor), and took it through phase 2 trials. In May 2008, methylnaltrexone received FDA approval for marketing in the United States.

He has been praised for encouraging Americans to exercise and live healthier lives, and he has been an outspoken critic of politicians who use health funds for other purposes – particularly for taking tobacco settlement money and using it for unintended purposes. Besides advocating for a healthier lifestyle today, Roizen has speculated that by 2023 one of the 14 areas of aging might have a breakthrough that will allow people to live until 160 with the same quality of life as at age 45. This speculation has been met with both criticism as well as agreement.

Roizen has also been criticized for what has been called his wild exaggerations about the potential payoffs of exercise and healthy eating.

== Biography ==
After attending the Nichols School, he received a Bachelor of Arts degree from Williams College in 1967 with a double major in Chemistry and Economics. Subsequently, he attended the University of California, San Francisco School of Medicine. His residency was at Harvard's Beth Israel Deaconess Medical Center. After 9 years on the faculty at the University of California, San Francisco, he was the chair of the Department of Anesthesia and Critical Care and Pain Management at the University of Chicago for 16 years. He then became dean of the School of Medicine and vice president for Biomedical Sciences at SUNY Upstate.

He co-founded RealAge, a service providing personal health tools to consumers. In 2004 and was named chief wellness officer and chair of the Wellness Institute in 2007.

Roizen still practices anesthesiology and internal medicine. He has served on the boards of five non-profit foundations.

Roizen and his wife, Nancy, a developmental pediatrician, live in Cleveland, Ohio. The Roizens have two children.

== Media appearances ==
He has appeared on various television shows and was featured in various magazines. Roizen and Dr. Oz coauthor a daily newspaper column in a number of newspapers.

== Real Age ==
The idea for RealAge started in 1985 when Roizen convinced a 47-year-old entrepreneur to take his blood-pressure medication by explaining he was living with the body of a 52-year-old by not doing so. The entrepreneur paid for Roizen to assemble a five-person research team and identify controllable factors that affect length and/or quality of life.

The first RealAge test debuted online in 1998.

== Cleveland Clinic ==
Michael Roizen became the Cleveland Clinic's chief wellness officer in mid-2007. The position was new for the clinic and was notable, as it made Roizen one of the top 12 executives within the health system. He is also a professor of medicine at the Cleveland Clinic Lerner College of Medicine. Among his initiatives are starting a farmer's market near the clinic's main campus, mentoring children in the public schools, and starting smoking cessation and weight-loss programs. He has also encouraged a walking-focused health program

== Books and publications ==
- RealAge: Are You as Young as You Can Be? by Michael F. Roizen, 2001, ISBN 0-06-093075-6.
- The RealAge Diet: Make Yourself Younger with What You Eat, by Michael F. Roizen, John La Puma, 2001, ISBN 978-0756760472
- Cooking the RealAge Way: Turn Back Your Biological Clock with More than 80 Delicious and Easy Recipes, by Michael F. Roizen, John La Puma, 2003, ISBN 0-06-000935-7.
- The RealAge Makeover: Take Years off Your Looks and Add Them to Your Life, by Michael F. Roizen, 2004, ISBN 0-06-019682-3.
- The RealAge Workout: Maximum Health, Minimum Work, by Michael F. Roizen, Tracy Hafen, 2006, ISBN 0-06-000937-3.
- YOU: The Owner's Manual: An Insider's Guide to the Body that Will Make You Healthier and Younger, by Michael F. Roizen, Mehmet Oz, 2005, ISBN 0-06-076531-3.
- YOU: The Smart Patient: An Insider's Handbook for Getting the Best Treatment, by Michael F. Roizen, Mehmet Oz, 2006, ISBN 0-7432-9301-0.
- YOU: On A Diet: The Owner's Manual for Waist Management, by Michael F. Roizen, Mehmet Oz, 2006, ISBN 0-7432-9254-5.
- YOU: Staying Young: The Owner's Manual for Extending Your Warranty, by Michael F. Roizen, Mehmet Oz, 2007, ISBN 0-7432-9256-1.
- YOU: Being Beautiful: The Owner's Manual to Inner and Outer Beauty, by Michael F. Roizen, Mehmet Oz, 2008 ISBN 978-1-4165-7234-3.
- YOU: Having a Baby: The Owner's Manual to a Happy and Healthy Pregnancy, by Michael F. Roizen, Mehmet Oz, 2008 ISBN 978-1-4165-7240-4.
- YOU: Raising Your Child: The Owner's Manual From First Breath to First Grade by Michael F. Roizen, Mehmet Oz, 2010 ISBN 978-1-4423-3530-1.
- YOU: Losing Weight: The Owner's Manual to Simple and Healthy Weight Loss by Michael F. Roizen, Mehmet Oz, 2011 ISBN 978-1-4516-4417-3.
- YOU: Stress Less: The Owner's Manual for Regaining Balance in Your Life by Michael F. Roizen, Mehmet Oz, 2011 ISBN 978-1-4516-5907-8.
- YOU: The Owner's Manual For Teens: A Guide to a Heathy Body and Happy Life by Michael F. Roizen, Mehmet Oz, 2011 ISBN 978-0-7432-9258-0.
- YOU(r) TEEN: Losing Weight: The Owner's Manual to Simple and Healthy Weight Management at Any Age by Michael F. Roizen, Mehmet Oz, 2013 ISBN 978-1-4767-1357-1.
- Essence of Anesthesia Practice, by Michael F. Roizen, Lee A. Fleisher, 1997, ISBN 978-0-7216-5972-5.
- Essence of Anesthesia Practice, by Michael F. Roizen, Lee A. Fleisher, 2002, ISBN 978-0-7216-9267-8.
- Essence of Anesthesia Practice, by Michael F. Roizen, Lee A. Fleisher, 2011, ISBN 978-1-4377-1720-4.
- What to Eat When: A Strategic Plan to Improve Your Health and Life Through Food, by Michael Roizen, Michael Crupain, and Ted Spiker, 2018, ISBN 978-1-4262-2011-1.
