= Stuart Linder =

American plastic surgeon and media personality

Stuart A. Linder
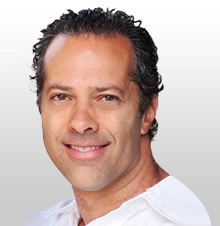
- Born: May 15, 1965 (age 61); Pacific Palisades, California, U.S.
- Education: University of California, Los Angeles
- Occupation: Plastic Surgeon
- Website: www.drlinder.com

Stuart Linder is an American plastic surgeon and writer. He is known for his appearances on several reality and news television shows.

== Media appearances ==
Linder is a member of the medical advisory board for The Dr. Oz Show, as well as an editorial advisory board member for Mehmet Oz's social media/health website Sharecare, He has worked as a correspondent with Entertainment Tonight for plastic and reconstructive surgical issues. He has appeared on 20/20 exploring most innovative techniques on breast enhancement. Linder has appeared on K-CAL 9. He has also appeared on The Doctors. Dr. Linder was featured in the Louis Theroux BBC documentary Under the Knife.

Linder appeared with Courtney Stodden in 2013 as she announced that he performed her breast-augmentation surgery.

== Published books ==
Linder is the author of The Beverly Hills Shape: The Truth About Plastic Surgery.
