= Sharecare =

American healthcare company

Sharecare, Inc.
- Type: Private
- Industry: Digital health
- Founded: October 7, 2010; 16 years ago
- Founders: Jeff Arnold; Mehmet Oz
- Headquarters: Atlanta, Georgia, United States
- Key people: Jeff Arnold (CEO), Stuart Linder (board member)
- Owner: Altaris (2024–present)
- Number of employees: 2,400
- Divisions: Enterprise, Provider, Consumer Solutions
- Website: www.sharecare.com

Sharecare, Inc. is an American health and wellness company that provides consumers with personalized health-related information, programs, and resources. It provides personalized information to the site's users based on their responses to the RealAge Test, the company's health risk assessment tool, and offers a clinical decision support tool, AskMD.

== History ==
Headquartered in Atlanta, Sharecare was founded in 2010 by Jeff Arnold (founder of WebMD) and Mehmet Oz, in partnership with Remark Media, Harpo Studios, Sony Pictures Television and Discovery Communications.

Sharecare began as an interactive question-and-answer (Q&A) platform about health and then expanded its products and services through internal development and strategic acquisitions of companies including DailyStrength, dotFit, The Little Blue Book, WisePatient, RealAge, PKC Corporation, BACTES Imaging Solutions, QualityHealth, Feingold Technologies, BioLucid and Healthways.

On October 22, 2024, the firm announced that it had been acquired by Altaris.

== Services ==
Much of its content is contributed by organizations like AARP, the American Cancer Society, the American Heart Association, the American Red Cross, the National Academy of Sports Medicine, and medical professionals. Questions are also answered by medical centers such as the Cleveland Clinic. The platform allows them to answer questions and engage in conversations about health.

AskMD, launched in December 2013, is a web-based application, (also a mobile application), that collects information about symptoms, provides information about causes, and locates physicians. AskMD guides users through a personalized questionnaire that takes into account symptoms and other factors, like medications and known conditions, and matches answers against available clinical research. AskMD's clinical knowledge management system was developed through Sharecare's acquisition of PKC Corporation. It was named Best Medical App at the 4th Annual Appy Awards, and was named an official 2014 Webby Award honoree in Mobile & Apps: Health & Fitness.

Sharecare expanded into population health in 2016 when the company acquired a division of business from Healthways including its Blue Zones Project. Part of the deal also included the Gallup-Healthways Well-Being Index. In July 2019, a five-year partnership was announced between Sharecare and The Boston University School of Public Health, collaborating on a "Community Well-Being Index" based on analysis of environmental factors affecting patient health.

In February 2020, Sharecare announced the acquisition of Visualize Health, a platform that develops health quality measures.

== RealAge ==
RealAge is a division of Sharecare that provides health information to consumers. It was founded by Michael Roizen, currently the chief wellness officer at The Cleveland Clinic. In the RealAge Test, users typically fill out a questionnaire about their health history, which is then used to generate personalized content, including highly targeted advertisements. Most revenue comes from pharmaceutical companies paying to advertise their drugs to individuals who have taken the website test and become members.

RealAge was owned by Hearst Magazines, which purchased it for an estimated $60 million to $70 million in 2007, when the company had $20 million in revenue. In 2009, the company was profitable, making its money from pharmaceutical companies for which it compiled test results of RealAge members and sending them highly targeted marketing messages by e-mail. On March 8, 2012, Sharecare acquired RealAge for an undisclosed amount.

== Criticisms ==
=== Paid sponsors ===
Concerns have been raised regarding the bias of answers provided on Sharecare.com by “knowledge partners," or paid sponsors. Such knowledge partners include (among others): Colgate-Palmolive; Pfizer; Unilever (Dove skin-care products); health insurer UnitedHealthcare; and Walgreens drug stores.

=== Dental amalgam ===
In June 2013, the American Dental Association (ADA) withdrew as a knowledge partner in response to what it considered an irresponsible attack by co-owner Mehmet Oz's "Dr. Oz Show" on the use of dental amalgam. ADA President Dr. Robert A Faiella summed up the group's reaction by stating: "As a science-based organization, we should always welcome inquiry, but we should not be seen as supporting the promotion of misleading information unsupported by the best science."

=== Delayed reporting of data breach ===
A data breach that occurred with Sharecare Health Data Services (SHDS) as early as May 2018 was not reported to users until February 2019. No explanation was given for the delayed reporting. HIPAA, the federal law governing healthcare data privacy, requires that data breaches be reported within 60 days. The breach included the personal information of at least 18,416 Blue Shield of California and at least 5,500 AltaMed members. Patients affected were offered 12 months of free credit monitoring and identity theft protection services.

== See also ==
- HealthTap – a mobile health platform with Q&A
- Answers.com – a general Q&A resource
