= DailyStrength =

- Company type: Subsidiary
- Website type: social networking
- Founders: Doug Hirsch, Co-founder; Lars Nilsen, Co-founder
- Parent: Sharecare
- Website: dailystrength.org
- Launched: 2006
- Current status: active

DailyStrength is a division of Sharecare that serves as a social network centered on support groups, where users provide one another with emotional support by discussing their struggles and successes with each other. The site contains online communities that deal with different medical conditions or life challenges. As of November 4, 2007, DailyStrength has created over 500 support groups focused on issues such as depression, divorce, parenting, and a wide variety of cancers; Furthermore, health blogs, expert answers, treatment, and a non-professional community of support located all over the world.

The top member groups consist of Anxiety, Bereavement, Bipolar Disorder, breakup and divorce, chronic pain, Depression-teen, eating disorders, Fibromyalgia, family issues, healthy relationships. According to DailyStrength writing helps anyone suffering about 93% of the time, so therefore DailyStrength has the option to write a journal. That person can set their entries to private or public, along with time and date, feeling and goals. Hugbook is an option for people to spread their love around; the hugs can consist of a moment of peace, a rainbow, a thank-you, flowers, hopeful sayings such as ' I'm with you' and 'good luck', along with rays of sunshine. The person who shares these can also give a warming comment.

The site is free for members and the members are encouraged to remain anonymous. The site provides members with continual support as someone is always available to talk. Medical professionals are also available to contact and treatments for a variety of illnesses and problems are also listed on the site. The top level categories of most talked about topics are as follows, the number of members are presented in parentheses; Children's Health and Parenting (75), Cancers (38), Brain and Nervous System (30), Genetic and Metabolic (74), Mental Health and Addiction (56), Personal Challenges (46), Relationships and Sexuality (40), Heart, Blood, and Circulation (31). In addition, the primary advisors that contribute to DailyStrength by giving advice and talking about various topics are: Sharecare, Jacob Teitelbaum, MD (Integrative Medicine), Stauart Linder, MD (Plastic and Reconstructive Surgery), Doctor Oz ( The News), Dr. Jeremy F. Shaprio ( Pediatrician), Cyndi Samoff-Ross (Marriage and Family Therapist), Lee Trask ( Infertility Blogger), Dr. Georgianna Donadio (Whole Person Health Care, NIWH), Dr. Kimberly Dennis (Psychiatrist, Timberline Knolls Residential Treatment Center). The most popular treatments recommended by these advisors are; Psychotherapy (85%), Talking (86%), Support from friends and family (88%), Writing (93%), Music (94%), Positive Thinking (81%), Zoloff (65%), Lexapro (65%), Prozac (65%), patience (82%), Wellbutrin (65%), Phsycical Exercise (95%), Effexor (64%), crying (81%), Paxil (56%). All the facts and percentages are calculated by DailyStrength's database, which receives all the data from its members and experts.

The company was founded on August 3, 2006 by Doug Hirsch, Lars Nilsen and Josh DeFord. Hirsch was one of the first employees at Yahoo and previously built products for online communities there and at Facebook. Hirsch founded the company in response to his own difficulties dealing with a death in his family as a teenager.

Over the six-month period ending June 2007, DailyStrength's market share increased by 95%, with the average user spending over 26 minutes on the site.

DailyStrength is a subsidiary of Sharecare, created by WebMD founder and Discovery Communications' Chief of Global Digital Strategy Jeff Arnold, along with Dr. Mehmet Oz.
