= MedlinePlus =

Online information service produced by the US National Library of Medicine

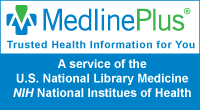
- Available in: English; Spanish
- Creator: National Library of Medicine
- Website: www.medlineplus.gov

MedlinePlus is an online information service produced by the United States National Library of Medicine. The service provides curated consumer health information in English and Spanish with select content in additional languages. The site brings together information from the National Library of Medicine (NLM), the National Institutes of Health (NIH), other U.S. government agencies, and health-related organizations. There is also a site optimized for display on mobile devices, in both English and Spanish. In 2015, about 400 million people from around the world used MedlinePlus. The service is funded by the NLM and is free to users.

MedlinePlus provides encyclopedic information on health and drug issues, and provides a directory of medical services. MedlinePlus Connect links patients or providers in electronic health record (EHR) systems to related MedlinePlus information on conditions or medications.

PubMed Health was another NLM site that offered consumer health information, in addition to information for health professionals. However, "PubMed Health, a portal for systematic reviews as well as consumer health information, was discontinued on October 31, 2018. The same or similar content is being provided through other NLM resources, namely PubMed and Bookshelf (for systematic review content), and MedlinePlus (for consumer health information)."

== History ==
The National Library of Medicine has long provided programs and services for professional medical scientists and health care providers, including MEDLINE and the various services that access it, such as PubMed and Entrez. By the 1990s, more members of the general public were using these services as Internet access became widespread. But nonprofessional users could benefit from reliable health information in a layperson-accessible format. The National Library of Medicine introduced MedlinePlus in October 1998, to provide a non-commercial online service similar, for example, to the commercial WebMD. In 2010 another NCBI service, PubMed Health, complemented MedlinePlus in offering curated consumer health information; PubMed Health focuses especially on finding information about clinical effectiveness of treatments.

MedlinePlus initially provided 22 health topics in English, which expanded to almost 1000 health topics in English and Spanish, plus links to health information in over 40 languages. MedlinePlus was recognized by the Medical Library Association for its role in providing health information. The site scored 84 in the American Customer Satisfaction Index for 2010.

In 2000s, A.D.A.M.'s medical encyclopedia was incorporated into MedlinePlus. The "Animated Dissection of Anatomy for Medicine, Inc." is a NASDAQ-traded public company based in Atlanta, Georgia, that provides consumer health information and benefits technology products to healthcare organizations, employers, consumers, and educational institutions.

== Key features ==
The MedlinePlus website provides information in text-based webpages as well as in videos and tools. Other ways to access to access MedlinePlus content include MedlinePlus Mobile, which is a point-of-care tool for clinicians, and MedlinePlus Connect, which connects to Electronic Health Records (EHRs).
