= RxList =

- Company type: Health Information
- Founded: 1995
- Owner: WebMD (2004–present)
- Website: www.rxlist.com

RxList is an online medical resource of US prescription medications providing full prescribing information and patient education. It was founded in 1995 by Neil Sandow, Pharm.D.

RxList is an owned and operated site in the WebMD Consumer Network and was acquired by WebMD in December 2004.

RxList provides content written by pharmacists and physicians and data provided by credible sources including the FDA, Cerner Multum, and First Data Bank, Inc. RxList, as part of the WebMD Consumer Network, adheres to the same privacy policy as WebMD.com and is certified by TRUSTe.

As of March 2023 RxList was ranked #14 in the eBizMBA Top 15 Best Health Websites.
