= John La Puma =

American physician and chef

- Born: 1960 or 1961 (age 65–66); New York City, United States
- Education: University of California, Santa Barbara (B.A. 1978); Baylor College of Medicine (MD 1982)
- Website: www.drjohnlapuma.com

John J. La Puma is an Italian-American internist, chef, and author.

== Early life and education ==
La Puma was born in New York City around 1960–1961, one of six children. His family relocated to Santa Barbara, California in 1967, where La Puma attended elementary school through San Marcos High School. He enrolled at the University of California, Santa Barbara's College of Creative Studies and received a B.A. in Creative Studies, Biology in 1978.

He earned his MD from Baylor College of Medicine in 1982. He trained in internal medicine at UCLA's West Los Angeles VA. He completed the first U.S. postgraduate fellowship for physicians in clinical ethics and general internal medicine at the University of Chicago, became a Clinical Associate Professor there and founded the Lutheran General Center for Clinical Ethics, pioneering hospital clinical ethics consultation in the U.S. He later graduated (in Professional Cooking) from the Cooking and Hospitality Institute of Chicago, part of Le Cordon Bleu, received a Permaculture Design Certificate from Santa Barbara City College's program and a Professional Naturalist certificate from the University of California.

== Career ==
La Puma taught in Chicago at Kendall College as a professor of nutrition. While serving as a professor and practicing medicine, he also cooked with chef Rick Bayless at Frontera Grill and Topolobampo in Chicago weekly for four years.

La Puma would later found CHEF Clinic, the Cooking, Healthy Eating and Fitness program to prevent and treat obesity, maintain weight loss and measurably promote wellness. He is co-founder of ChefMD^{R}, a health and media company, and founder of CHEF Clinic^{R}, GlutenFreeQuiz for celiac disease screening and Do You Need More Nature? for nature deficit disorder. The first physician to teach cooking and nutrition in a U.S. medical school, he has authored over 250 original publications, book chapters, abstracts and books. His research interests include weight control, nature deficit disorder, food as medicine, employee wellness, stress management and medical ethics. His first book for the general public, written with Dr. Michael Roizen, The RealAge Diet: Make Yourself Younger with What You Eat (April 2001) reached The New York Times Bestseller List. His cookbook is Cooking the RealAge Way (May 2003), co-authored with Dr. Roizen. Dr. La Puma contributed recipes to The New York Times Bestseller YOU: The Owner’s Manual (May 2005), co-authored by Drs. Roizen and Mehmet Oz. His ChefMD's Big Book of Culinary Medicine (April 2008) reached The New York Times Bestseller List in October 2008. In it, La Puma describes the new field of culinary medicine (the art of cooking integrated with the science of medicine), taught in 22 U.S. medical schools by 2016 , and its application to 40 common health conditions. He next wrote Refuel: A 24 Day Eating Plan (January 2014) to help men learn how food works in their bodies and how to boost low testosterone without medication. He gave TEDx and TEDMED talks (in 2011 and 2014, respectively) on culinary medicine and in 2019 recorded GreenRx, a mini docuseries on nature therapy for anxiety, addiction and well-being. He lectured at Harvard University on The Scientific Basis for Nature as Medicine in 2019, and cites work on his organic regenerative farm as illustrative of the preventive and therapeutic potential of nature-based medicine, identifying nature experience as an essential prescription.

== Personal life ==
La Puma resides in Santa Barbara, California.

== Television shows ==
- A GreenRx with Dr John La Puma: Nature Heals on YouTube, 2019
- Eat and Cook Healthy with Dr John La Puma! on PBS, a quarterly PBS Special, 2011–2014
- ChefMD Shorts with Dr John La Puma! on PBS, national carriage, 2014–2017
- What’s Cookin’ With ChefMD? on Lifetime Television's Health Corner Series, 2006–2010
- Guest appearances on The Dr. Oz Show, The Today Show, Good Morning America, The 700 Club, 2008-

== Published works ==
- Refuel: A 24-Day Eating Plan to Shed Fat, Boost Testosterone, and Pump Up Strength and Stamina, by John La Puma, 2014, ISBN 978-0770437466
- ChefMD's Big Book of Culinary Medicine: A Food Lover's Road Map to Losing Weight, Preventing Disease, and Getting Really Healthy by John La Puma, Rebecca Powell Marx ISBN 9780307394620
- YOU: The Owner's Manual: An Insider's Guide to the Body that Will Make You Healthier and Younger, by Michael F. Roizen, Mehmet Oz, 2005, ISBN 0-06-076531-3 (recipes)
- Cooking the RealAge Way: Turn Back Your Biological Clock with More Than 80 Delicious and Easy Recipes by Michael F. Roizen, John La Puma, 2003, ISBN 0-06-000935-7
- The RealAge Diet: Make Yourself Younger with What You Eat by Michael F. Roizen, John La Puma, 2001, ISBN 0-06-008612-2
- Managed Care Ethics: Essays on the Impact of Managed Care on Traditional Medical Ethics John La Puma, 1998, ISBN 1-57826-012-4
- Ethics Consultation: A Practical Guide by John La Puma, David Schiedermayer, 1994, ISBN 0-86720-797-3
- Numerous contributions to The New England Journal of Medicine, The Journal of the American Medical Association, The Annals of Internal Medicine, JillianMichaels.com, Intent.com, Guideposts, Tribune Media Syndicate
