= Jeff Arnold (internet entrepreneur) =

American Internet entrepreneur

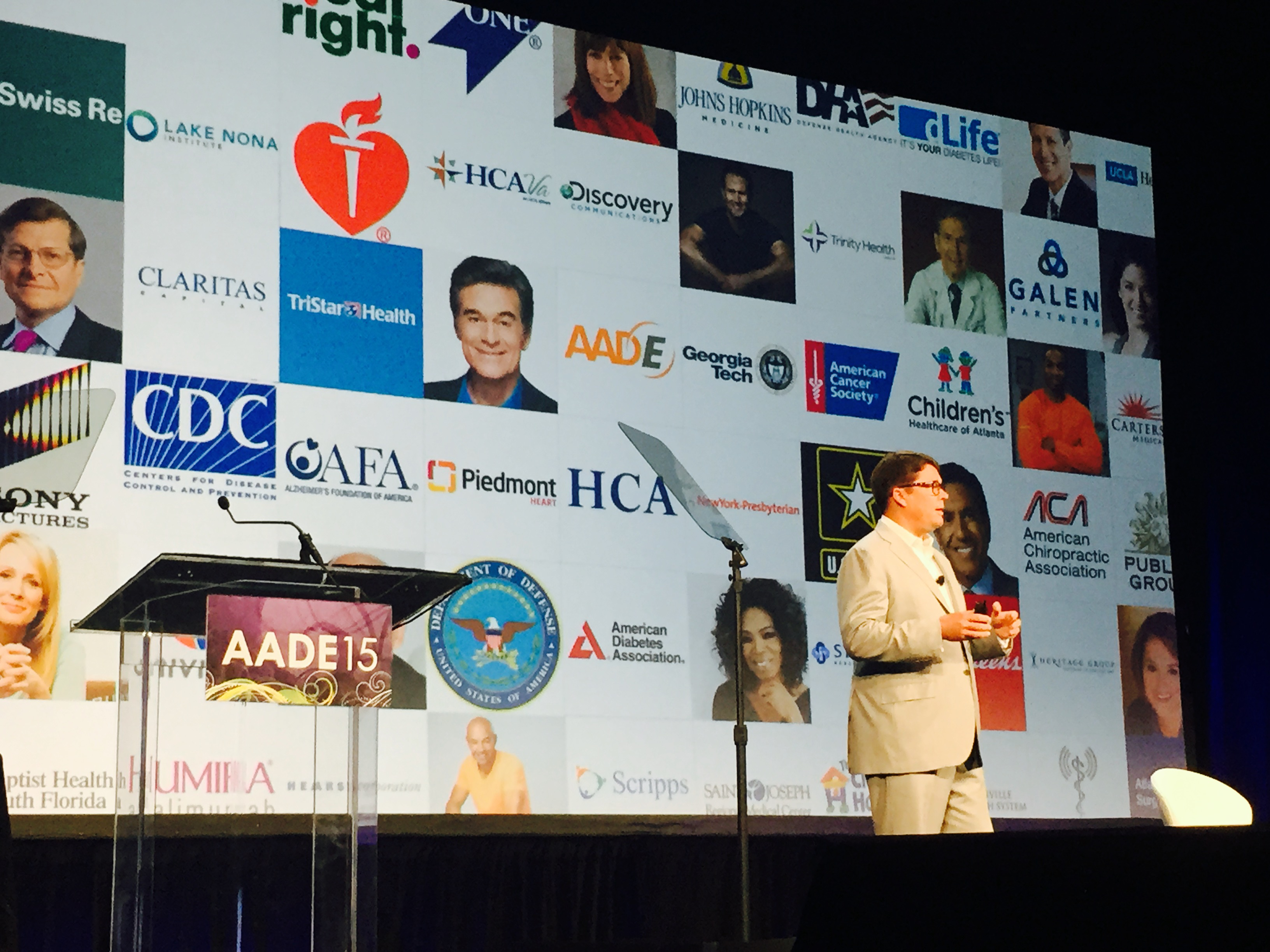
- Arnold in 2015
- Born: 1969 or 1970 (age 56–57)
- Education: University of Georgia
- Employer: Sharecare

Jeffrey Todd Arnold is an American Internet entrepreneur and media proprietor. He founded the website WebMD in 1998, and co-founded the health platform Sharecare with Mehmet Oz in 2010, both of which provide users with personal health tools.

== Education ==
Arnold is from the U.S. state of Georgia. He attended the University of Georgia, where he studied communications before withdrawing in 1993. He graduated from the university at a later date.

== Professional career ==
Arnold worked in pharmaceutical sales early in his career. Described by Atlanta magazine as a "serial" entrepreneur, he has founded multiple health care companies, including cardiac monitoring business Quality Diagnostic Services (QDS), medical website WebMD, and Atlanta-based Sharecare, for which he is chairman and chief executive officer (CEO). Arnold was also the chairman and CEO of HowStuffWorks.

Arnold and his wife founded QDS in 1994, and later sold the company in 1998 for $25 million. In October 1998, he launched WebMD, a health care company that provides consumers, health institutions, and physicians with medical information through the Internet. Arnold continued as CEO until he left WebMD in 2000. In 2001, he formed The Convex Group, a vulture fund, for which he also was chairman and CEO. He has been credited with the growth of HowStuffWorks, which Convex purchased in 2003 for $2 million and sold to Discovery Communications in 2007 for $250 million. He has also been credited with helping Convex acquire Flexplay and LidRock. In 2010, he co-founded Sharecare with Mehmet Oz. Arnold has been credited with finding investors for both WebMD and Sharecare in Nashville.

In 2003, Arnold started LidRock, which produced promotional miniature CDs attached to the lids of fountain drinks. LidRock CDs were placed in between two lids, with the top one peeled away to obtain the disc. Arnold purchased 19 patents from various companies in order to produce the LidRock concept. The CDs were typically sold at fast-food restaurants and movie theaters, and generally were used to promote new video games or music from singers such as Britney Spears. More than 10 million LidRocks had been sold as of 2004, and more than 30 million as of 2005.

== Awards ==
- Entrepreneur of the Year, Southeast Region by Ernst & Young. (1999)
- Inducted into the Technology Hall of Fame of Georgia. (2013)
- Blumenthal Award by Johns Hopkins University in recognition of his ability to bridge business and technology.(2013)
- Technology Association of Georgia Icons of the Industry’ Award (2016).
- Lifetime Achievement Award from the Atlanta chapter of TiE (The IndUS Entrepreneurs) (2016)
- innovation category in the Atlanta Business Chronicle’s Health Care Heroes (2016).
