= A.D.A.M., Inc. =

A.D.A.M., Inc. or Animated Dissection of Anatomy for Medicine, Inc. was a NASDAQ-traded public company based in Atlanta, Georgia, that provided consumer health information and benefits technology products to healthcare organizations, employers, consumers, and educational institutions. Founded in 1990 and headquartered in Atlanta, Georgia, the company went public in 1995. Its 2009 assets were U.S.$39 million and its 2009 revenues were U.S. $28 million.

A.D.A.M.'s products included a medical encyclopedia, which in 2000 was incorporated into MedlinePlus, and the Benergy benefits communication and healthcare decision support platform.

In 2011 Ebix Inc. acquired ADAM Inc. for $66 million. This acquisition was being investigated by Bull & Lifshitz, LLP as well as a number of other law firms for possible breaches of fiduciary duty.

== Broker and employer solutions ==
Through the acquisition of Online Benefits in 2006, the company provided a suite of employee benefits products that benefits brokers provided to employers and used to manage their agencies.

== Health solutions ==
The company also provided online consumer health information and products to hospitals, healthcare organizations, consumer health portals and health plans. The Multimedia Encyclopedia included over 3,900 consumer health articles and over 3,000 medical illustrations and images. In addition to the encyclopedia, other products included The Body Guide, Symptom Navigator, Drug Tools, Health Risk Assessments, Wellness Tools, Care Guides, Health Centers, Quick Sheets, and more. Clients included MedlinePlus, about.com, The New York Times, and hospitals.

== Education solutions ==
A.D.A.M. Education created online learning resources for teaching and learning about the human body and how it functions.

== Mobile presence ==
In 2009, A.D.A.M. brought out its free iPhone application, Medzio, giving access to consumer health articles, local healthcare services, and expert-driven discussions.
