= MedicineNet =

Healthcare information website

- Company type: Health information
- Founded: October 1996
- Headquarters: San Clemente, California, United States
- Parent: WebMD
- Website: medicinenet.com

MedicineNet is an American healthcare information website launched in 1996. The website provides a medical dictionary and information about diseases, conditions, medications and general health. In partnership with Veritas Medicine, it connects site users with appropriate clinical trials.

MedicineNet is a site from Information Network that provides a medical dictionary; databases on pharmaceuticals and their side effects, and diseases and treatments. In the "ask the experts," section you can query online physicians.

== Personnel ==
Dr. William C. Shiel co-founded MedicineNet to provide the public with current, comprehensive medical information, written in easy-to-understand language. He was Chief Editor until July 2020 and authored or edited over 15,000 articles for the website. He continues as Chief Medical Editor/Author on the site's medical editorial board.

Dr. Melissa Stöppler also serves on the MedicineNet editorial board and is the chief medical editor of eMedicineHealth.com, another WebMD subsidiary.

Shiel was co-editor-in-chief of the first three editions of Webster's New World Medical Dictionary, with Stöppler joining as co-editor-in-chief for the edition.

== Privacy policy and certification ==
MedicineNet, as part of the WebMD Consumer Network, adheres to the same privacy policy as WebMD.com, and shares their participation in the TRUSTe Enterprise Privacy & Data Governance Practices Certification program. MedicineNet was formerly certified by the now-defunct HONcode to be in compliance with the Health on the Net health website principles.

== Popularity ==
MedicineNet was ranked # 5 in the July 2017 eBizMBA Top 15 Most Popular Health Websites. In April 2018 the site was ranked # 8 in the Health – Health category. As of April 2023, the site was ranked # 90 in the Health – Other category.
