= Healthcare information =

Healthcare information can refer to:

- Healthcare information systems
- Healthcare information technology
- Healthcare Information For All - a community of practice
- Healthcare Information Technology Standards Panel
