= Mehmet Oz =

American TV host and government official (born 1960)

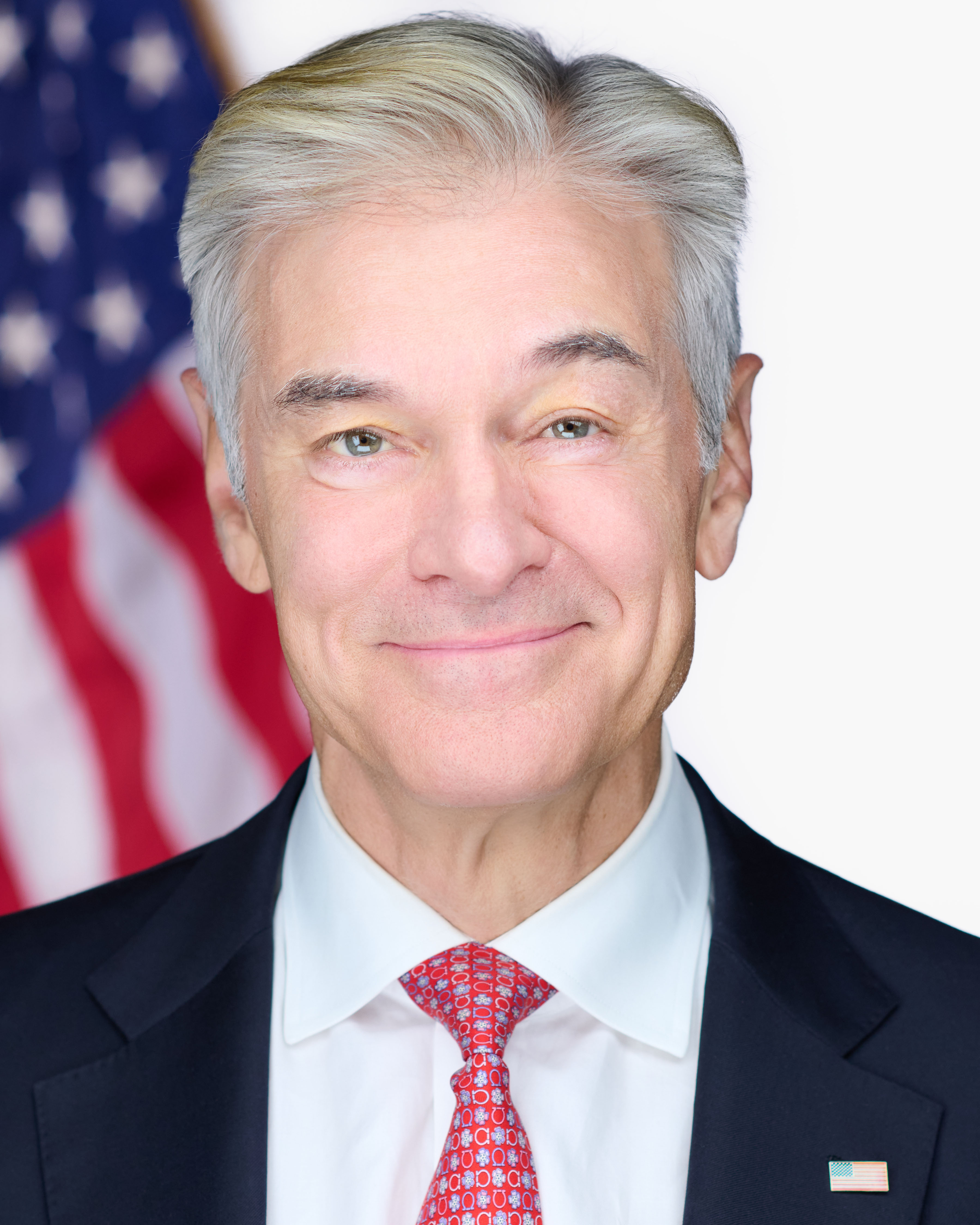
- Official portrait, 2025

17th Administrator of the Centers for Medicare and Medicaid Services
- Incumbent
- Assumed office April 8, 2025
- President: Donald Trump
- Preceded by: Stephanie Carlton (Note: Acting: January 31, 2025–April 8, 2025); Chiquita Brooks-LaSure

Co-chairman of the President's Council on Sports, Fitness, and Nutrition
- In office 2018–2022
- President: Donald Trump; Joe Biden
- Preceded by: Dominique Dawes; Drew Brees
- Succeeded by: Elena Delle Donne; José Andrés

Personal details
- Born: Mehmet Cengiz Oz; June 11, 1960 (age 66) Cleveland, Ohio, U.S.
- Citizenship: United States; Turkey
- Party: Republican
- Spouse: Lisa Lemole (m. 1985)
- Children: 4, including Daphne
- Education: Harvard University (BA); University of Pennsylvania (MD, MBA)
- Years active: 1986–present
- Organization(s): HealthCorps, Sharecare
- Television: The Dr. Oz Show
- Occupation: Television presenter; physician; author
- Awards: Full list
- Website: doctoroz.com

Military service
- Allegiance: Turkey
- Branch/service: Turkish Land Forces
- Years of service: Early 1980s for 60 days
- Oz's voice Oz delivers remarks asserting that use of Paracetamol during pregnancy contributes to autism Recorded September 22, 2025

Mehmet Cengiz Oz (Note: Turkish: Öz) ( /məˈmɛt ˈdʒɛŋɡɪz ɒz/ mə-MET JENG-ghiz oz; Turkish: [mehˈmet dʒeɲˈɟiz øz]; born June 11, 1960), better known as Dr. Oz (/ɒz/), is an American television presenter, physician, author, educator, and government official serving as the 17th administrator of the Centers for Medicare & Medicaid Services (CMS) since 2025.

The son of Turkish immigrants, Oz was raised in Wilmington, Delaware. He is a dual citizen of the U.S. and Turkey. Oz received degrees in medicine and business from the University of Pennsylvania. He subsequently began his residency in surgery at Presbyterian Hospital in New York in 1986, co-founding its Cardiac Complementary Care Center to provide various types of alternative medicine to heart disease patients. Oz helped create new procedures and medical devices, including the MitraClip. In 2001, Oz became a professor of surgery at Columbia University, and became emeritus in 2018. In May 2022, Columbia cut ties with Oz and removed him from their website.

In 2003, the Discovery Channel launched Second Opinion with Dr. Oz, while Oz also appeared as a regular guest on The Oprah Winfrey Show, making more than sixty appearances. In 2009, The Dr. Oz Show, a daily television program about medical matters and health, was launched by Winfrey's Harpo Productions and Sony Pictures Television, running for 13 seasons and winning 10 Daytime Emmy Awards. Oz's promotion of pseudoscience, including on the topics of alternative medicine, faith healing, and various paranormal beliefs, has earned him criticism from several medical publications and physicians.

In 2022, Oz ran in the U.S. Senate election in Pennsylvania as a Republican; he was the first Muslim candidate for Senate to be nominated by either major party. Oz lost the election to the Democrat John Fetterman. In 2025, President Donald Trump appointed Oz to lead the Centers for Medicare & Medicaid Services (CMS); he was confirmed by the Senate along party lines. (Note: Democratic Senators Tammy Duckworth of Illinois and Patty Murray of Washington did not vote on Oz's confirmation as CMS administrator.)

== Early life and education ==
Mehmet Oz was born on June 11, 1960, in Cleveland, Ohio, to Mustafa Cavit Öz and Suna Yıldız Öz (née Atabay), who had immigrated from Turkey. He is of partial Circassian descent. His father, born in Bozkır, Konya Province, Turkey, graduated at the top of his class from Cerrahpaşa Medical School in 1950. He then moved to the United States to join the general residency program at Case Western Reserve University in Cleveland, where, subsequently, Mehmet was born. Mustafa Öz trained in cardiothoracic surgery at Emory University in the Atlanta area and served as chief of thoracic surgery at the Medical Center of Delaware for several years before eventually moving back to Turkey.

Oz has two sisters, Seval Oz and Nazlim Oz. Mehmet is the Turkish version of the Arabic name Muhammad. He grew up in a mixed Muslim environment, in which his father's family practiced traditional Islam, while his mother's family were secular Muslims.

As a child, he spent summers in Turkey and, during the 1980s, after finishing college, he served in the Turkish Army for sixty days to maintain his dual citizenship. (Note: This requirement applied specifically to Turkish citizens living abroad who sought to retain their citizenship.)

As his father was training at Emory, Oz and his family briefly moved to Atlanta, where his sister Seval was born, and then to Wilmington, Delaware, where he grew up. He finished Tower Hill School. and, subsequently enrolled at Harvard University, from which, in 1982, he graduated with a B.A. magna cum laude in biology. He played safety on Harvard's football team and was a goalkeeper on the men's varsity water polo team. In 1986, he obtained an M.D. from the University of Pennsylvania School of Medicine and an M.B.A from Penn's Wharton School. He was provided with the Captain's Athletic Award for leadership in college and served as class president and then student body president during his time in medical school.

== Medical career ==
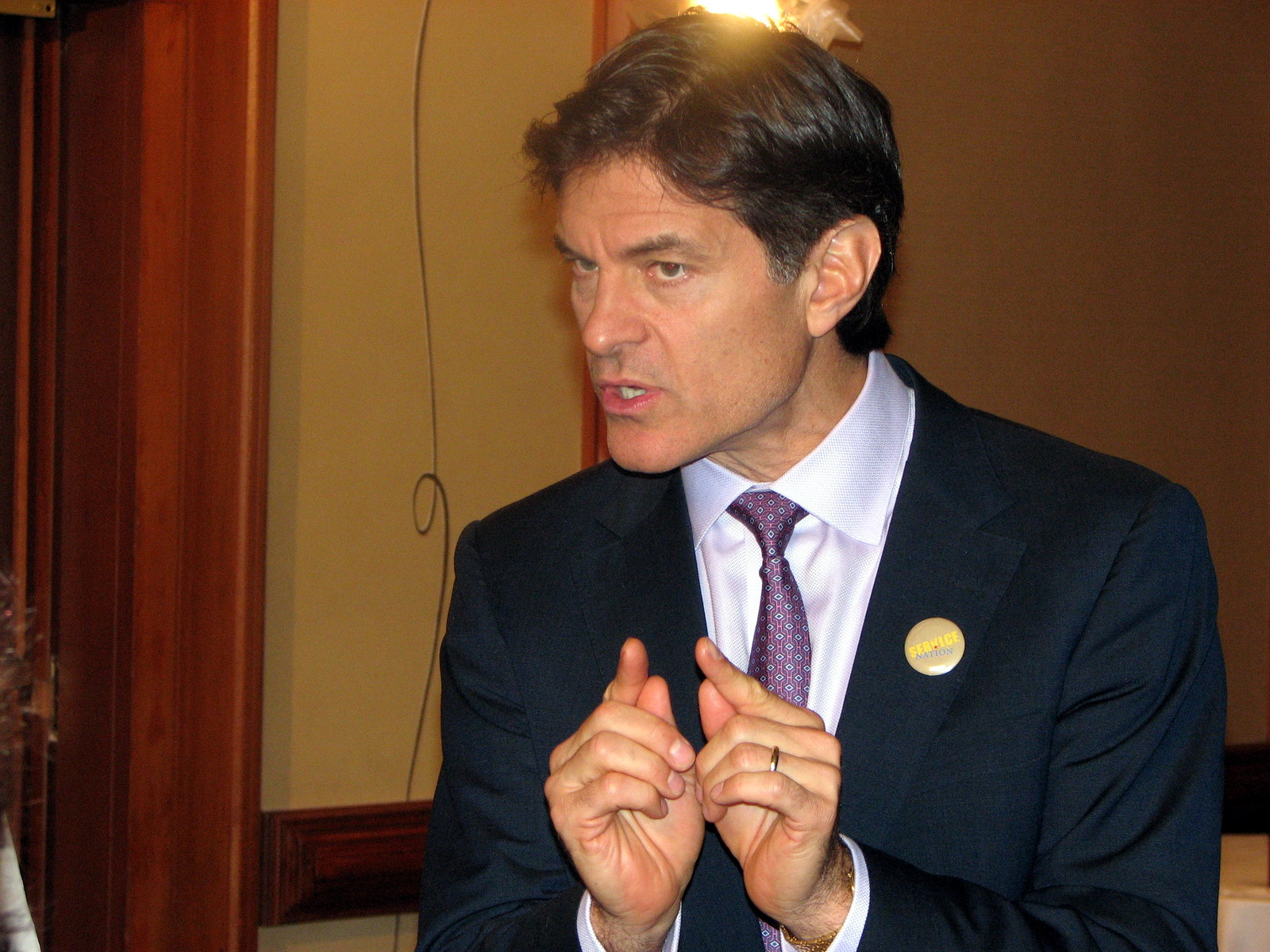
Oz at ServiceNation in 2008

Oz began his medical career with a residency in general surgery and a fellowship in cardiothoracic surgery at the Presbyterian Hospital in New York City, then affiliated with Columbia University, in 1986 after being hired by Eric Rose. In April 1995, Oz and his colleague Jerry Whitworth founded the Cardiac Complementary Care Center to provide various types of alternative medicine to heart disease patients. The publicity of Oz's work created tension with hospital administration, who expressed alarm at Oz's use of therapeutic touch, which he dropped in response to their objections.

In 1996, Oz and Rose received media publicity following their work on a successful heart transplant for Frank Torre, brother of New York Yankees manager Joe Torre, during the 1996 World Series, which the Yankees won. Rose later remarked that while he did not enjoy the media attention, Oz "loved it". Meanwhile, Oz and Whitworth's professional relationship grew strained due to the attention Oz was receiving; Whitworth later recounted in an interview with Vox that he asked Oz to "stop the media circus". In 2000, Whitworth departed the Cardiac Complementary Care Center, which Oz reopened that same year as the Cardiovascular Institute and Integrative Medicine Program at the NewYork-Presbyterian Hospital, where he served as director.

Oz became a professor at the Columbia University Vagelos College of Physicians and Surgeons in 2001, a title he held until 2018, when he became emeritus. In May 2022, the institution cut ties with Oz and removed him from their website.

He has helped develop numerous devices and procedures related to heart surgery, including the MitraClip and the left ventricular assist device (LVAD), and by 2015 held several patents related to heart surgery.

In 2003, Oz was scheduled to present medical research on heart bypass surgery and heart-lung machines to the yearly conference of the American Association for Thoracic Surgery. Oz was forced to withdraw the presentation. He was banned from presenting to the association or publishing work in the association's medical journal for two years. Association officials said that the ban was not due to academic dishonesty, but in part due to Oz's team having changed the methodology of the study from what was agreed upon for presentation. Oz's 2022 political campaign said that the incident was due to Oz's team having extended "the scope of the work with more patients". Anonymous sources cited by The Washington Post said that another reason for the rejection was having data from too few test subjects to reach a strong conclusion.

In 2010, Oz joined Jeff Arnold as co-founder of Sharecare, Inc. In 2015, a group of 10 physicians demanded Columbia remove Oz from the faculty for his alleged "disdain for science and for evidence-based medicine". Columbia defended Oz and dismissed calls for his termination, saying that they are "committed to the principle of academic freedom and to upholding faculty members' freedom of expression". Oz responded to the call, saying "I bring the public information that will help them on their path to be their best selves" and that his show provides "multiple points of view, including mine, which is offered without conflict of interest."

In 2024, he was accused of not disclosing his role in the food supplement company iHerb, whose products he recommends in his various channels.

== Television career ==
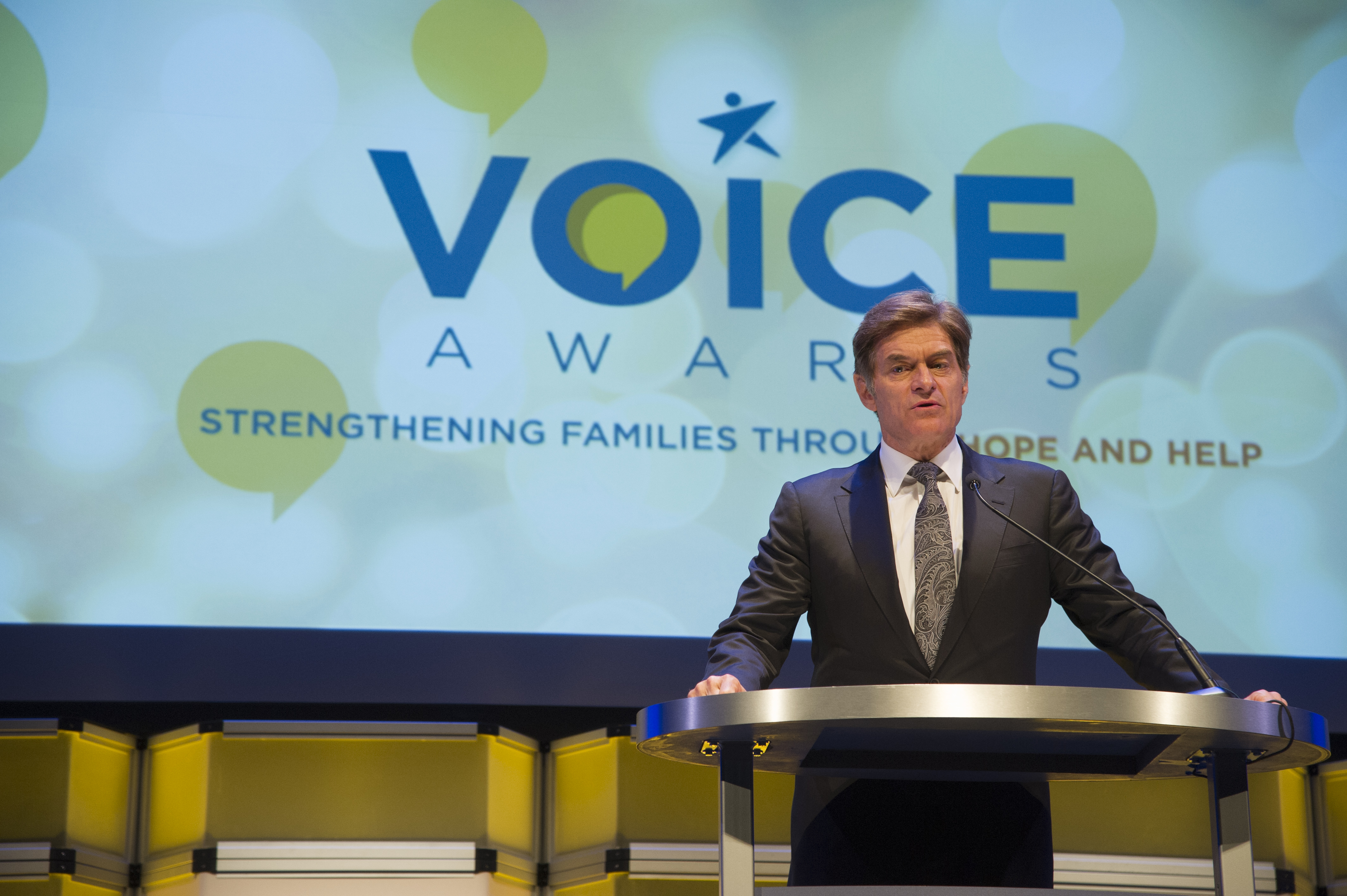
Oz at the 2016 Voice Awards

Oz made his television hosting debut with Second Opinion with Dr. Oz in 2003, aired through the Discovery Channel and produced by Oz's wife, Lisa. Through Second Opinion, Oz first met Oprah Winfrey, who appeared as an interviewee for an episode. The show would run for only five episodes, however, Oz and Winfrey cultivated a professional relationship that would lead to Oz regularly appearing as a health expert on The Oprah Winfrey Show for five seasons, making more than sixty appearances beginning in 2004. In 2009, Winfrey offered to produce a syndicated series hosted by him through her company, Harpo Productions. The Dr. Oz Show debuted on September 14, 2009, distributed by Sony Pictures Television.

On The Dr. Oz Show, Oz addressed issues like Type 2 diabetes and promoted resveratrol supplements, which he claimed were anti-aging. His Transplant! television series won both a Freddie and a Silver Telly award. He was a consultant on heart transplantation for Denzel Washington's John Q.

In January 2011, Oz premiered as part of a weekly advice show on OWN called "Ask Oprah's All-Stars," where he co-starred with Suze Orman and Phil McGraw to answer various questions related to their respective professions. In the 2010s, he also hosted a health segment on 1010 WINS titled "Your Daily Dose". On October 23, 2014, Surgeon Oz, showing Oz's career as a surgeon, debuted on OWN.

In September 2016, during his presidential campaign, Donald Trump appeared on The Dr. Oz Show. In the lead-up to the show's taping, Oz promoted Trump's appearance with a claim that Oz would assess medical records submitted to the show by Trump and reveal his assessment on the show. CNN speculated that Trump's appearance aimed to appeal to The Dr. Oz Show's large female viewership. Oz would later be appointed to the President's Council on Sports, Fitness, and Nutrition in 2018 during Trump's administration.

Beginning on March 22, 2021, Oz guest-hosted the trivia television game show Jeopardy! for two weeks. The decision to make him a guest host was met with criticism from Jeopardy! fans and former contestants.

The Dr. Oz Show aired its final episode on January 14, 2022, after over a decade on the air.

=== Medical claims and controversies ===
Senator Claire McCaskill criticizes Oz during a hearing on consumer fraud in diet product advertising in 2014.

While Oz himself is not involved in medical weight loss scams, he has made statements that scammers have exploited to sell products falsely marketed for weight loss. During a 2014 Senate hearing on consumer protection, Senator Claire McCaskill said that "the scientific community is almost monolithic against you" for airing segments on weight loss products that are later cited in advertisements, concluding that Oz plays a role, intentional or not, in perpetuating these scams. McCaskill expressed concern with Oz that he was "melding medical advice, news, and entertainment in a way that harms consumers." He has been a spokesman and advisor for the website RealAge.com, which The New York Times has criticized for its pharmaceutical marketing practices.

In 2012, Oz entered into an arrangement with USANA Health Sciences, a multi-level marketing dietary supplement manufacturer, which has been accused of being a pyramid scheme. Oz was paid over $50 million over five years to promote USANA products on his show.

During the COVID-19 pandemic, Oz's television appearances influenced Trump's decision-making, and he became an informal advisor to the Trump administration. Oz had promoted the use of hydroxychloroquine, an antimalarial drug, as a cure for COVID-19 on more than 25 Fox News broadcasts in March and April 2020. Trump claimed to be taking the drug in May 2020. In June 2020, the Food and Drug Administration revoked emergency use authorization of hydroxychloroquine, saying that it was "no longer reasonable to believe" that the drug was effective against COVID-19 or that its benefits outweighed "known and potential risks". Oz also owns at least $630,000 of stock in two companies that manufacture or distribute hydroxychloroquine, Thermo Fisher and McKesson Corporation.

In April 2020, Oz appeared on Fox News with Sean Hannity and said that reopening schools in the United States might be worth the increased number of deaths it would cause. Referencing an article published in the medical journal The Lancet, Oz said, "I just saw a nice piece in The Lancet [medical journal] arguing that the opening of schools may only cost us 2–3% in terms of total mortality." Oz's comments provoked a backlash online, and he apologized, saying he had misspoken and that his goal was "to get our children safely back to school."

== Political career ==
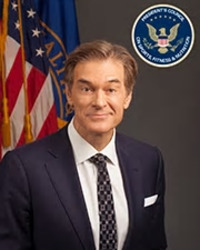
Official HHS portrait, 2018

In 2007, it was reported that Oz had been active in his local chapter of the Republican Party of New Jersey for several years, and had donated to Republicans John McCain and Bill Frist. He supported the re-election campaign of President George W. Bush in 2004 and the candidacy of Shmuley Boteach, a rabbi who ran for Congress as a Republican in New Jersey in 2012.

In 2018, Oz was appointed to the President's Council on Sports, Fitness, and Nutrition by President Donald Trump. (Note: The President's Council on Sport, Fitness, and Nutrition is an advisory committee for the Office of the Assistant Secretary for Health, an agency of the United States Department of Health and Human Services (HHS).) In 2022, President Joe Biden asked him to resign from the council because Oz's continued membership while running for the Senate would be a violation of the Hatch Act, but Oz refused; Biden subsequently removed him from the position.

=== 2022 U.S. Senate campaign ===
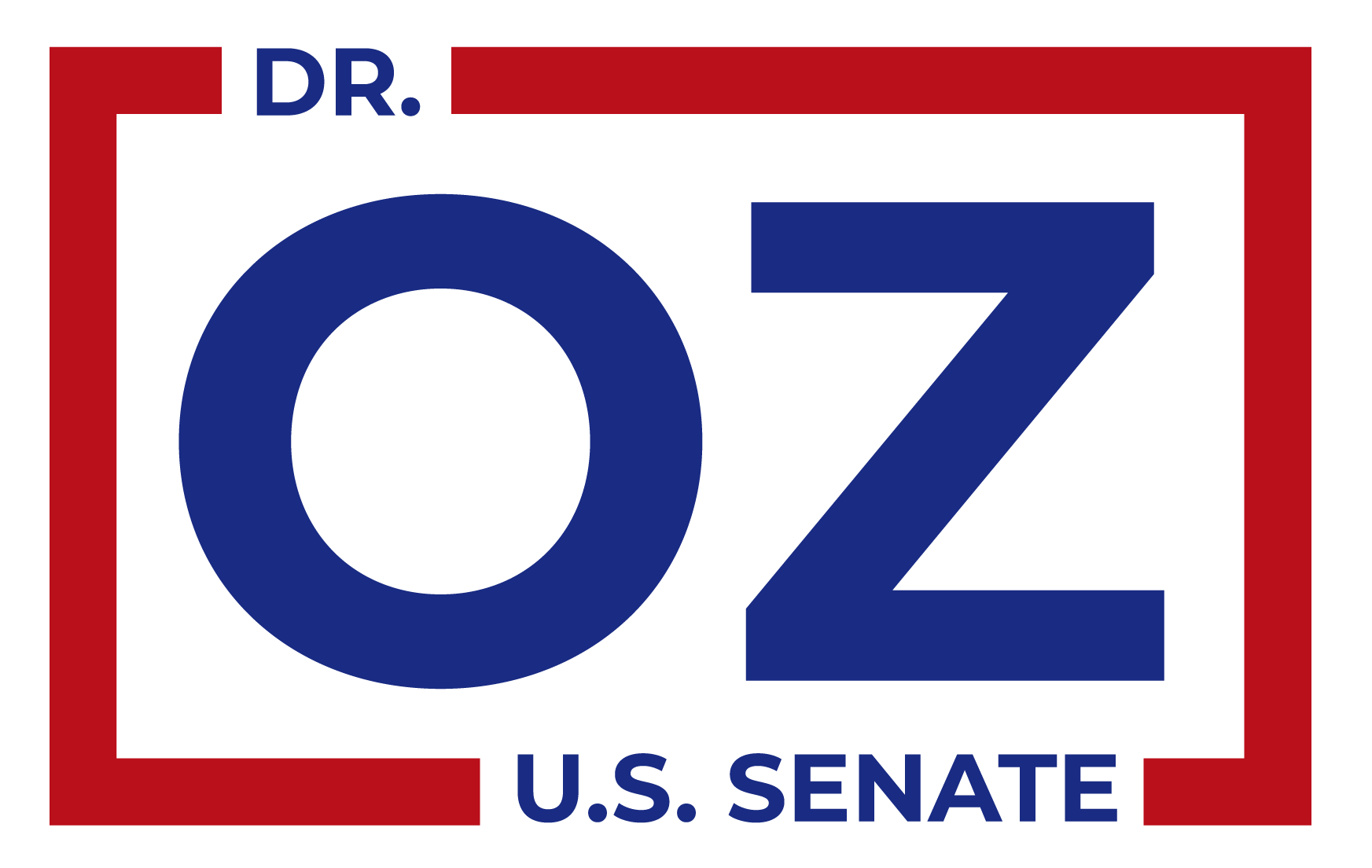
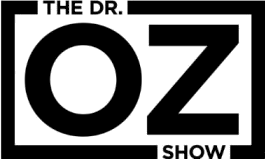
The logo for Oz's 2022 Senate campaign was based on the logo used for his TV show.

On November 30, 2021, Oz announced his candidacy for the Republican nomination for the United States Senate seat in Pennsylvania in 2022. After Oz announced his candidacy, a number of TV stations in Philadelphia, New York City, and Cleveland said that they would remove his show from the air, compelled by the FCC's equal-time rule that provide an equivalent air time to any opposing political candidates who request it. In his campaign, he called for immunologist Anthony Fauci, the Chief Medical Advisor to the President, to be fired and also opposed vaccine requirements. In March 2022, Oz was fired from the President's Council on Sports, Fitness, and Nutrition due to his candidacy for public office. Conservatives cast doubt on Oz's early candidacy due to concerns about his views and whether he was really conservative.

On April 9, 2022, Oz's campaign was endorsed by former president Donald Trump. Oz's ties to Turkey, including his dual citizenship, were criticized by his Republican primary opponents. Oz called these issues a "distraction" and said that he would renounce his Turkish citizenship if elected, while his campaign called the attacks "pathetic and xenophobic". Senate Republicans, including Lindsey Graham and Kevin Cramer, defended Oz over the issue.

The Republican primary was held on May 17. A day after the election, Oz narrowly led his main opponent David McCormick by a difference of just 0.1% of the vote, triggering a mandatory statewide recount. When the election was still too close to call and the mail-in ballots had not yet been counted, Trump urged Oz to declare victory. On May 27, before the recount started, Oz prematurely declared victory, calling himself the presumptive nominee and opposing counting certain mailed ballots. On June 3, Oz became the Republican nominee after McCormick conceded that the recount would not make up the deficit in votes. Oz was subsequently endorsed by three out of four major Republican candidates from the primary, including McCormick, with only Kathy Barnette initially declining to endorse him. Barnette later stated that she would vote for Oz, while still declining to explicitly endorse him.

During the race, Oz's opponents accused him of carpetbagging, as he did not live in Pennsylvania prior to 2020. Oz denied these accusations, noting that he owns a home within the state. A representative of Oz's campaign also pushed back on the claims, stating "Dr. Oz lives in Pennsylvania, votes in Pennsylvania, and has his medical license in Pennsylvania. Dr. Oz grew up in the Greater Philadelphia region, less than 5 miles from the PA border. He went to school in Pennsylvania, met his wife and got married in Pennsylvania, and 2 of his children were born there. He currently resides in Bryn Athyn, Pennsylvania, where his wife's family has lived for a hundred years."

On August 15, a campaign video from April of Oz shopping in a grocery store went viral. In the video, Oz says he is shopping for produce to make crudités (served with tequila), and that the perceived high prices are the fault of President Joe Biden. The video was widely ridiculed on social media and became the subject of media coverage. It was filmed at a Redner's Warehouse market, which Oz mistakenly identifies as a "Wegner's". Oz responded to criticism over the video, noting that when creating it, "I was exhausted. When you're campaigning 18 hours a day, I've gotten my kids' names wrong, as well. I don't think that's a measure of someone's ability to lead the commonwealth."

Oz's rival candidate John Fetterman suffered a stroke in May 2022 and needed time during the campaign to recover. In late August 2022, the Oz campaign released a list of mock debate concessions it would be willing to make, saying they would "pay for any additional medical personnel [Fetterman] might need to have on standby", that Oz "promises not to intentionally hurt John's feelings", and that "at any point, John Fetterman can raise his hand and say, 'Bathroom break!'". The next day, Fetterman announced that due to his recovery, he would "not be participating in a debate the first week of September"; in response, the Oz campaign said in a statement that "if John Fetterman had ever eaten a vegetable in his life, then maybe he wouldn't have had a major stroke and wouldn't be in the position of having to lie about it constantly", adding that Fetterman's statement was "whiny". Fetterman replied, "Today's statement from Dr. Oz's team made it abundantly clear that they think it is funny to mock a stroke survivor. I chose not to participate in this farce. My recovery may be a joke to Dr. Oz and his team, but it's real for me."

In September 2022, Oz called on Fetterman to participate in a debate against him before early voting begins in Pennsylvania on September 19. Fetterman agreed to debate Oz in "the middle to end of October" but would not commit to an exact date or to a debate in September. Fetterman's approach to the debate was criticized by Oz and Senator Pat Toomey. On September 15, Oz and Fetterman agreed to a single debate, which was held on October 25.

Oz lost to Fetterman in the Senate election by a margin of 4.9%, conceding defeat on November 9, 2022, and further urging "everyone to put down their partisan swords and focus on getting the job done". Oz was the first Muslim candidate for Senate to be nominated by either major party and, had he been elected, would have been the first Muslim to serve in the U.S. Senate, the first Muslim to serve in the United States Congress as a Republican, and one of the wealthiest members of Congress.

=== Centers for Medicare and Medicaid Services ===
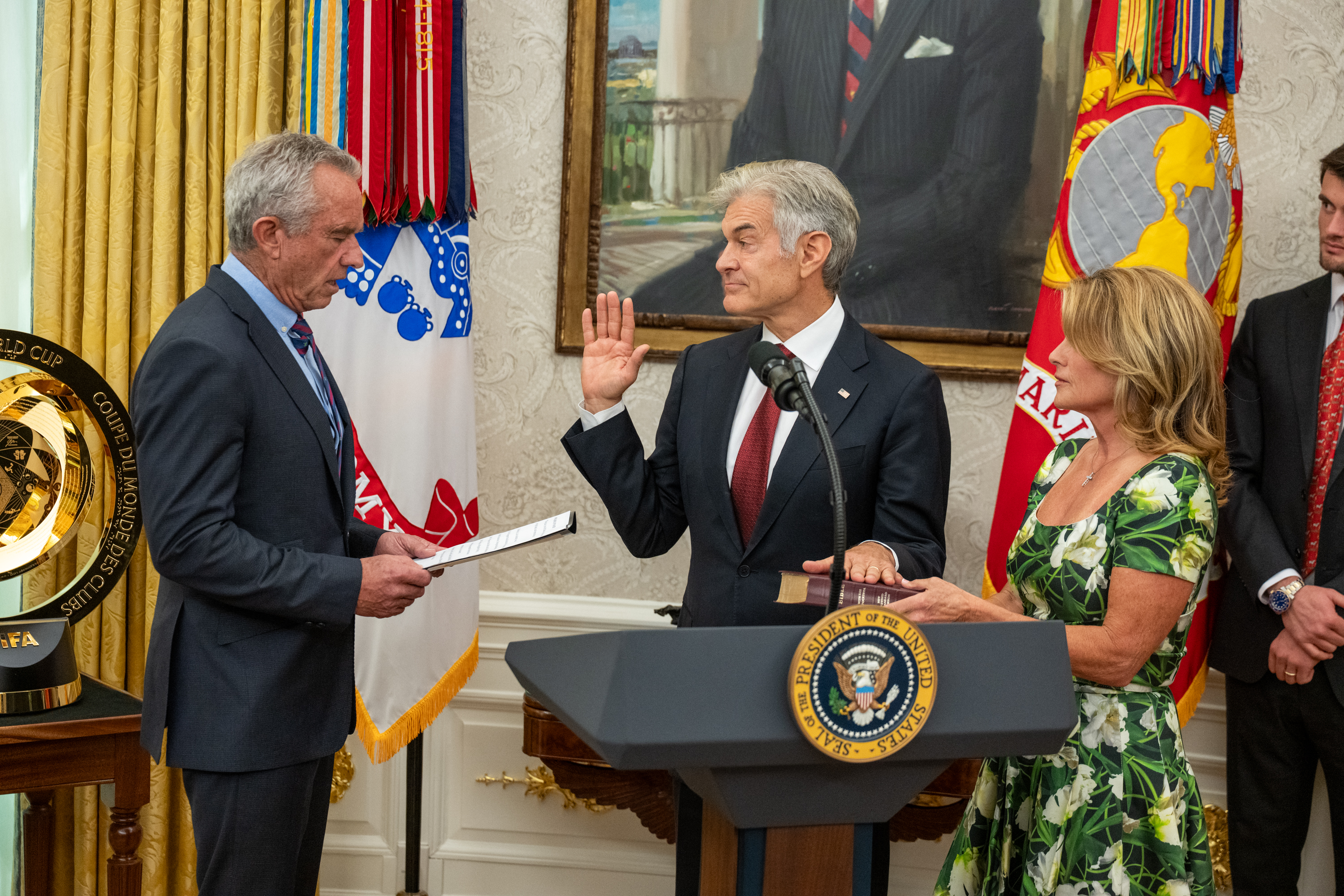
HHS secretary Robert F. Kennedy Jr. swearing in Oz as Administrator of the Centers for Medicare and Medicaid Services on April 18, 2025

On November 19, 2024, Oz was named by President-elect Donald Trump to serve as administrator for the Centers for Medicare and Medicaid Services (CMS) in his second administration. Trump said that Oz would work alongside Robert F. Kennedy Jr., his nominee for secretary of Health and Human Services (HHS), of which the CMS is a subdivision, to cut waste and fraud. Trump also said that Oz would "incentivize disease prevention". His predecessor at CMS was Chiquita W. Brooks-LaSure.

Unlike the reported hesitancy among Senate Republicans concerning Kennedy's nomination, Oz received a more favorable response, with Senator Susan Collins, who had previously campaigned for him during his Senate run, calling him "well respected." Mark McClellan, former CMS administrator under President George W. Bush, also praised his selection. Fetterman, Oz's former opponent, would express openness in voting to confirm him; in a statement, Fetterman said so long as "Dr. Oz is about protecting and preserving Medicare and Medicaid, I'm voting for the dude." In February 2025, Oz pledged to sell his stock investments in healthcare companies if confirmed for the position.

On March 14, 2025, Oz was interviewed by the U.S. Senate Finance Committee about his qualifications for becoming the Administrator of the Centers for Medicare and Medicaid Services. Senator Ron Wyden, the ranking Democrat on the committee, asked Oz to give a "yes" or "no" answer to whether he would fight against Medicaid cuts. In response, Oz said, "I cherish Medicaid, and I've worked within the Medicaid environment quite extensively." Wyden then accused Oz of supporting "premium hikes for families who purchase their own health insurance through the Affordable Care Act."

On April 3, the Senate confirmed Oz as CMS administrator along party lines by a vote of 53–45.

==== Tenure ====
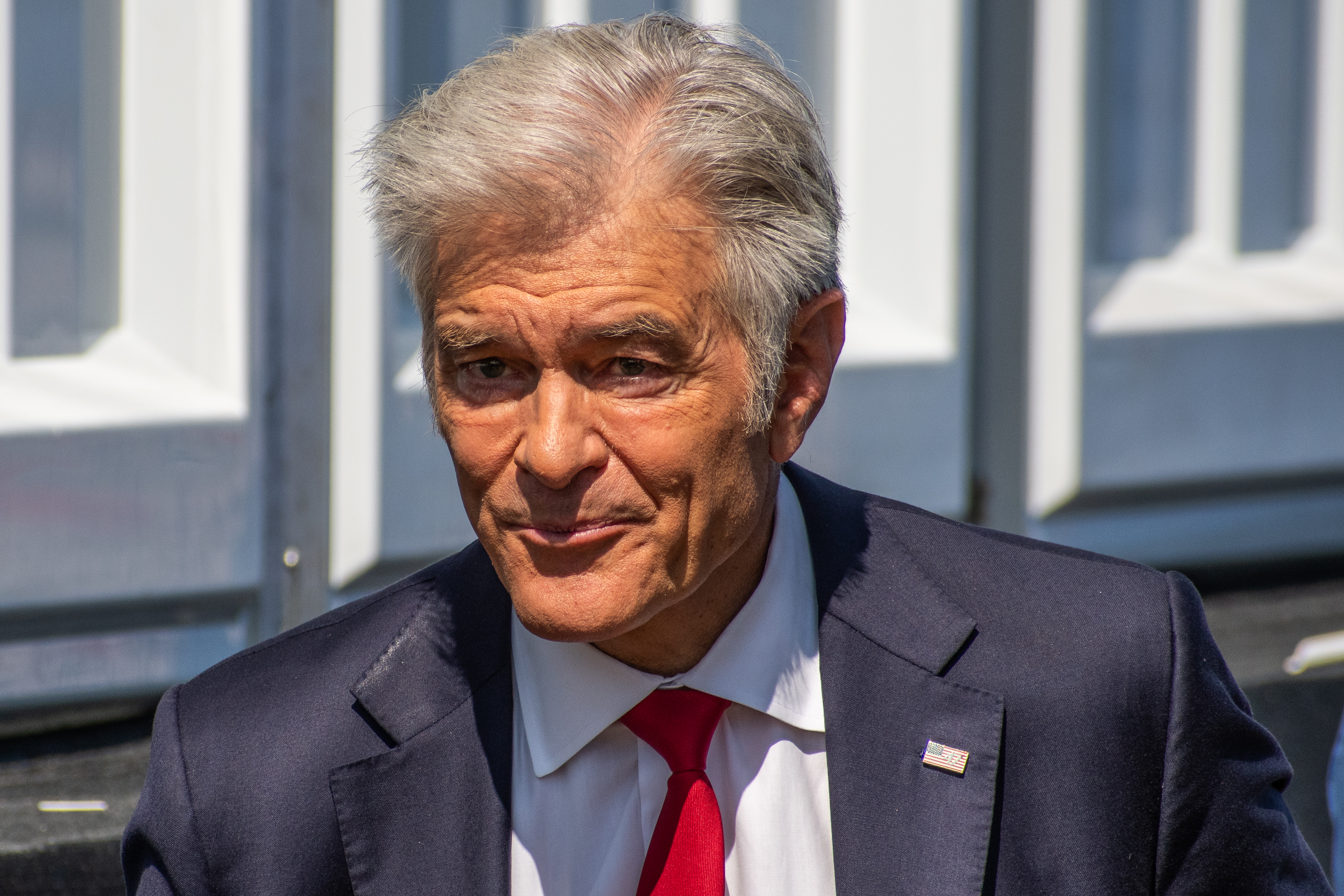
Mehmet Oz at the Great American State Fair in Washington, D.C., where he was a speaker on June 29, 2026.

Oz assumed office on April 8, 2025. He was ceremonially sworn in by President Trump on April 18, 2025.

On April 10, during his first all-staff meeting at CMS, Oz praised Secretary Kennedy's Make America Healthy Again initiative and called for replacing human physicians with artificial intelligence models. On April 11, Oz announced that Medicare would not pay for "gender reassignment surgeries or hormone treatments in minors".

In July, CMS would give Immigration and Customs Enforcement (ICE) access to the personal data of over 79 million Medicaid enrollees, intended to aid their deportation efforts. HHS responded to a media inquiry on this data transfer, stating: "Under the leadership of Dr. Oz, CMS is aggressively cracking down on states that may be misusing federal Medicaid funds to subsidize care for illegal immigrants." Permission to access Medicaid records was first authorized by Secretary Kennedy in June, following an agreement to provide Medicaid enrollment information reached between the Trump administration and Kennedy's top advisers, despite protests from CMS staff against such a move. The access to personal data went against internal department policy, dating back to 2013, forbidding the use of Medicaid records when it came to deportation enforcement. The ability for ICE to use CMS data would be blocked by Judge Vince Chhabria the following month.

On September 22, Oz co-authored an opinion piece in Politico, discussing research between leucovorin and potential treatment for autistic children. Oz wrote that leucovorin could help autistic children improve their verbal communication, while emphasizing that it "is not a cure for autism." He added that leucovorin would soon be approved as a form of treatment by the Food and Drug Administration. Oz also encouraged pregnant women to use acetaminophen "judiciously", and acknowledged conflicting research between its usage among pregnant women and their children's subsequent diagnosis of autism. On September 26, Oz encouraged pregnant women to consult with their doctors before taking Tylenol, and ultimately follow their doctor's recommendation.

In March 2026, Oz posted a video threatening to withhold Medicaid funding from New York on the basis of 3/4 of the state's Medicaid population receiving fraudulent homecare. However, only about 450,000 residents applied for homecare, instead of the 5.1 million that the CMS calculated. The CMS calculated 5.1 million by considering every monthly homecare claim to be from a unique individual, so a single disabled person receiving homecare for a year was counted as 12 people. By miscounting every person on homecare for a year as 12 people, the CMS reported to Oz that nearly 3/4 of New York Medicaid recipients were on homecare, which he used to threaten to cut Medicaid funding for their state.

In August 2026, Oz announced a CMS rule forbidding Medicaid and the Children's Health Insurance Program from paying for puberty blockers and hormone therapy to treat gender dysphoria.

== Political positions ==
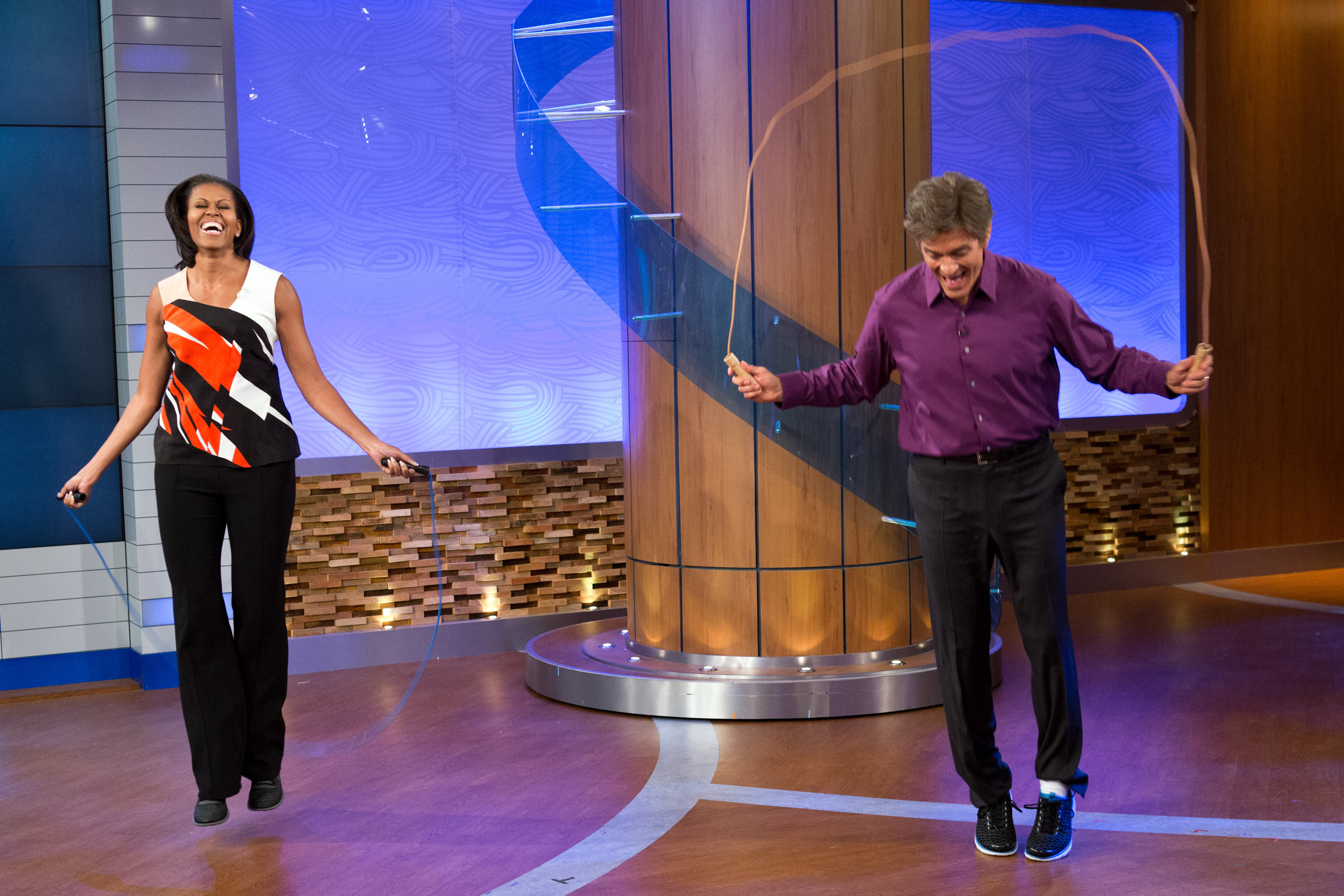
Oz with First Lady Michelle Obama in 2012 to promote her Let's Move! initiative. He has praised Obama for her focus on health and nutrition policies.

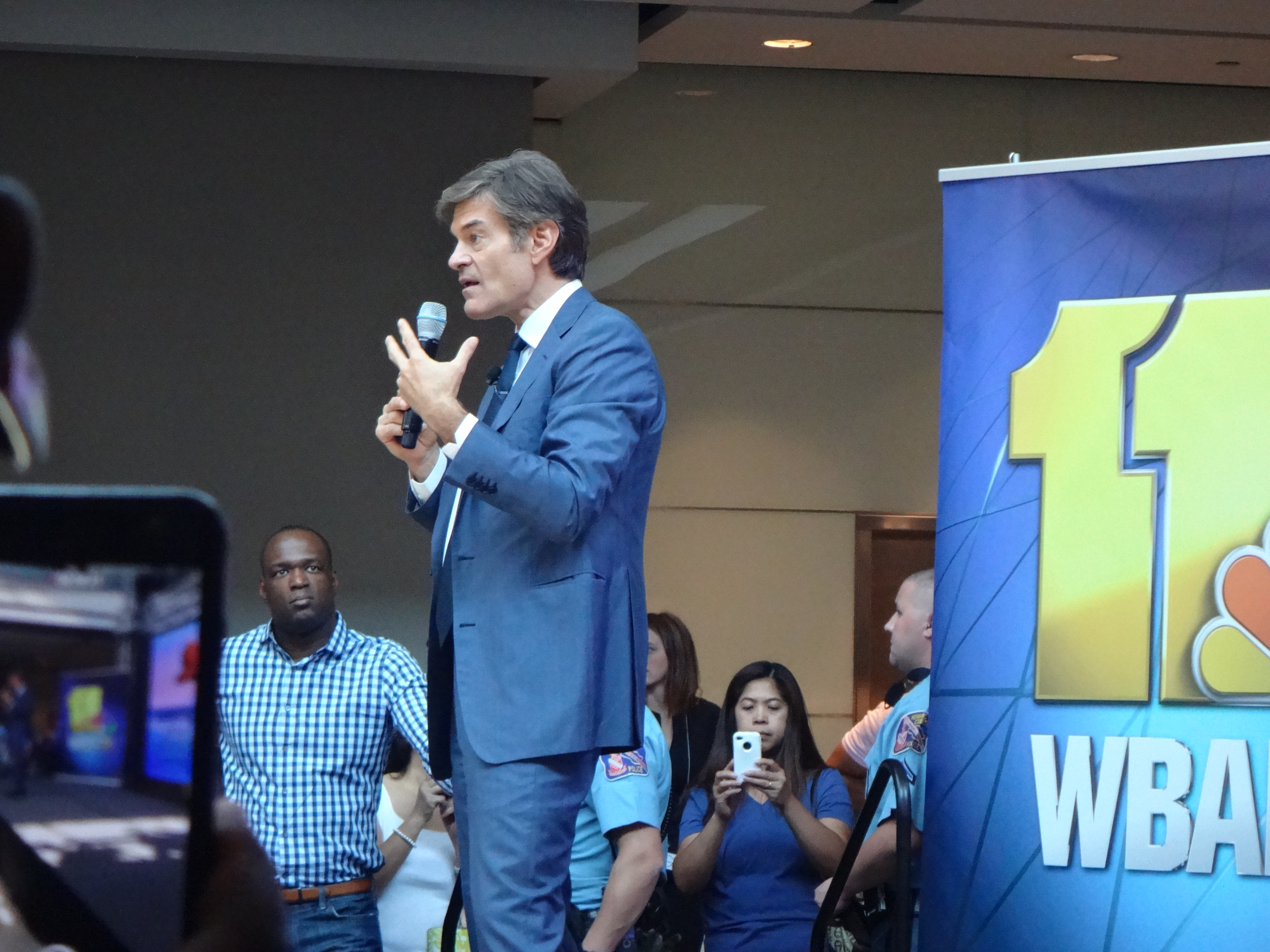
Oz speaking at the Mall in Columbia in Columbia, Maryland, August 2015

Making his 2022 Senate campaign announcement in late 2021, Oz identified himself as a "conservative Republican". In 2022, after his primary win, Oz described himself as "a moderate leader, but not passive."

In 2007, Oz had described himself as a "moderate Republican" and cited Arnold Schwarzenegger and Theodore Roosevelt as inspirations.

=== Abortion ===
In 2022, Oz announced that he supported overturning the 1973 Supreme Court Roe v. Wade decision and was against abortion, except for when the mother's life is in danger or in cases of rape or incest. In June 2022, he said he was "relieved" by the Supreme Court's decision in Dobbs v. Jackson Women's Health Organization. During a telephone town hall in May 2022, Oz said: "I do believe life starts at conception, and I've said that multiple times. ... If life starts at conception, why do you care what stage our hearts starts beating at? It's, you know, it's still murder."

Before 2019, Oz had supported abortion rights, although he said that he disliked abortion on "a personal level". He said that when he was in medical school at the University of Pennsylvania, he saw the results of "traumatic ... coat hanger events" in which women had been "harmed for life" before Roe. He also noted at the time that he was opposed to six-week abortion bans.

In October 2022, Oz said that "women, doctors, local political leaders" should put "ideas forward so states can decide for themselves" how to regulate abortions, but also clarified that "I don't want the federal government involved with that, at all".

=== Armenian community ===
Members of the Armenian-American community pressured Oz in 2022 to specifically recognize the Armenian genocide. Mark Momjian, the former chair of the Armenian Center at Columbia University, stated "We are convinced that he is part of a denial campaign when it comes to the Armenian genocide."

In January 2026, a civil rights complaint against Oz was filed by California government officials in reference to a video Oz posted accusing Armenian-owned businesses in Los Angeles of involvement with healthcare fraud. Oz had gestured at signs in Armenian language script on a local Armenian bakery, alleging there was fraud "by the Russian Armenian Mafia, you notice the lettering and language behind me". In response, Oz was accused of anti-Armenianism, including by the Armenian National Committee of America.

=== COVID-19 ===
In March 2020, Oz suggested that hydroxychloroquine, a drug typically used to treat rheumatological conditions and as an anti-malarial, could be used to treat COVID-19 as well. Oz also owns at least $630,000 of stock in two companies that manufacture or distribute hydroxychloroquine, Thermo Fisher and McKesson Corporation. In April 2020, he called for the reopening of schools. Oz has, however, promoted the efficacy of wearing masks and of getting vaccinated against the virus.

He initially praised Anthony Fauci as a "pro" and lauded his role in combating the pandemic in 2020 and 2021. Upon running for the Senate, however, Oz changed his tone on Fauci and referred to him as a "tyrant". Oz said in 2022 when running for the Senate that "it's time we get back to normal".

=== Death penalty ===
In an October 2022 interview with NBC, Oz said that he would "potentially" support the death penalty for dealers of fentanyl.

=== Education ===
Oz is a supporter of school choice and charter schools. He has criticized the power of teachers' unions and their close relationship with the Democratic Party.

=== Environment and climate change ===
In 2017, Oz co-authored an article that highlighted the threats of climate change, including extreme heat, wildfires, and floods. When running for the Senate, he downplayed the risk that carbon dioxide poses when contributing to the role of the greenhouse effect in contributing to climate change. In a March 2022 campaign event, Oz claimed that carbon dioxide is "not the problem".

In 2022, Oz said that he supports the process of hydraulic fracturing ("fracking") and believes that natural gas can help the United States become energy independent and reduce gasoline prices. In keeping with this view, he says he supports reducing environmental regulations on fracking. However, in 2014, Oz had called for more regulations on fracking, including halting the practice until the environmental impact had been researched more, because of the possible connection between fracking and the pollution of air and waterways.

=== Foreign policy ===
Oz has faced "dual loyalty" charges from critics, alleging he holds ties to Turkey's ruling Justice and Development Party. During his Republican primary campaign for Senate in December 2021, the National Review published a list of instances in which Oz interacted with people or groups associated with Recep Tayyip Erdoğan or his political party. Oz has denied any involvement with Erdoğan or the Turkish government, saying he had "never been politically involved in Turkey in any capacity."

==== China ====
In 2022, Oz took a "tough on China" stance similar to the Trump wing of the Republican Party. A key part of his primary campaign involved attacking rival David McCormick's business ties to mainland China. Oz faced scrutiny on this, due to his 2013 partnership with Neusoft Xikang, the health technology subsidiary of Chinese tech company Neusoft, where he served as their chief health advisor.

==== Israel ====
In 2022, Oz said that Israel is "an ally and a vibrant democracy in the world's most troubled region" and that he opposes the BDS Movement, supports keeping the US Embassy in Jerusalem and supports continued military aid to Israel. Oz has long been a supporter of Israel and visited the country in 2013. When speaking about the Israeli–Palestinian conflict in an interview with The Forward, Oz said, "It's not black and white. The ultimate solution will be driven by financial means. Peace is an imperative for that. When people love their children so much, they'll do whatever it takes to make their future brighter."

==== Ukraine ====
Oz condemned the Russian invasion of Ukraine, calling it "horrible" and "preventable".

=== Gun policy ===
Oz has said that he supports the constitutional right to bear arms under the Second Amendment. At a campaign event in February 2022, Oz said that he supports red flag-style laws for those expressing dangerous behavior, but opposes a national red flag law registry. Previously, in 2017, Oz had expressed support for waiting periods before someone can acquire a gun, and in 2019, he co-wrote a column that called for the United States to ban assault rifles altogether.

=== Healthcare ===
In 2009, Oz said, "It should be mandatory that everybody in America have healthcare coverage. If you can't afford it, we have to give it to you..." And in 2010, Oz supported a government-backed healthcare system and was featured in an advertisement that promoted the Affordable Care Act, also known as Obamacare. Oz has said that the healthcare systems that he thinks work the best are Germany and Switzerland, which are both universal healthcare systems.

By contrast, in 2022, Oz said that he would vote to repeal the Affordable Care Act if he were elected to the Senate, and backed Medicare Advantage Plus. Regarding those without healthcare coverage, Oz said they "don't have a right to health, but they have a right to access, to get that health."

=== LGBTQ rights ===
In 2010, Oz hosted and offered support to transgender youth and their families on his television show. In 2012, after facing criticism for hosting a guest who supported pseudoscientific reparative or conversion therapy on his show, he announced that he is opposed to conversion therapy and called conversion therapy "dangerous". Oz also had guests from GLAAD on his show who spoke out against conversion therapy.

As a Senate candidate, Oz endorsed enacting federal protections of same-sex marriage. In April 2022, Oz supported legislation to prohibit transgender people from participating in sports that are divided by gender-based categories rather than sex-based categories. In May 2022, he said that a transgender youth movement is based on "false science", while not supporting a ban on hormone blockers, adding that the doctor and family should decide, rather than politicians.

=== Marijuana ===
In 2014, Oz said on Larry King Live that "marijuana is hugely beneficial when used correctly for medicinal purposes" and in 2017 criticized the federal government for classifying marijuana as a Schedule I drug, which prevents more scientific research on marijuana. While running for the Senate in 2022, Oz said he opposes the legalization of recreational cannabis, but was not against it for medical purposes. In an interview with NBC News, Oz expressed support for President Joe Biden's effort to pardon those convicted of simple marijuana possession at the federal level.

== Personal life ==
Oz is fluent in English and Turkish. His net worth has been estimated at between $100 million and $300 million.

In August 2010, Oz was diagnosed with a pre-cancerous polyp in the colon during a routine colonoscopy which was performed as part of his show. Oz said that the procedure likely saved his life.

In 2019, Oz played for the home roster during the NBA All-Star Celebrity Game at the Bojangles' Coliseum in Charlotte, North Carolina. The roster was made up of celebrities with Carolina roots. He previously played in the 2010 NBA All-Star Celebrity Game. Also in 2019, Oz played for Team Cleveland in Major League Baseball's All-Star Legends & Celebrity Softball Game at Progressive Field in Cleveland.

=== Residency ===
Oz was born in Cleveland, Ohio, and raised in Wilmington, Delaware. He lived with his wife, Lisa, in Cliffside Park, New Jersey, for several decades, and holds his medical license within Pennsylvania.

In late 2020, Oz moved to Pennsylvania and changed his voter registration to his in-laws' home in Bryn Athyn, where he says he pays market price rent. He has since voted twice in Pennsylvania and acquired a Pennsylvanian driver's license and a Pennsylvania concealed carry permit.

Oz and his wife own at least ten properties throughout the United States and Turkey, including an estate in Palm Beach, Florida, valued between $5 million and $25 million, and a cattle farm in Okeechobee, Florida. In 2025, Oz offered to relocate a flock of 400 ostriches in British Columbia, set to be culled amid an Avian flu outbreak, to his ranch in Florida.

=== Citizenship ===
Oz is a dual citizen of the U.S. and Turkey. He has said that he maintains his Turkish citizenship to care for his ailing mother with Alzheimer's, but Oz expressed he would renounce it before being sworn in if he was ultimately elected to the Senate. No U.S. law forbids members of Congress from being dual citizens.

=== Family ===
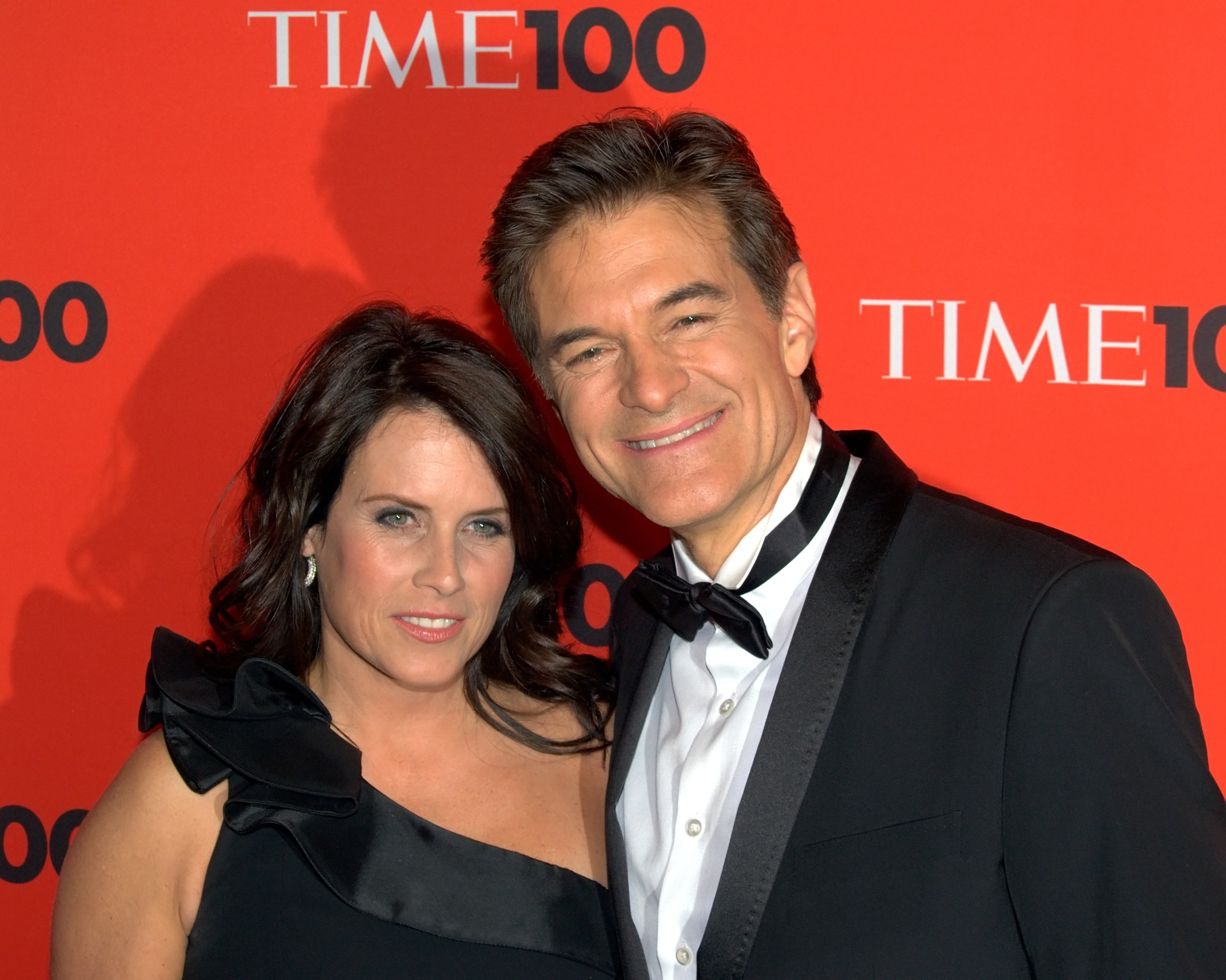
Oz and his wife Lisa at Time 100 gala (May 2010)

Oz married his wife, Lisa Oz, an author and television personality, in 1985. The two met in Philadelphia through their fathers, while Oz was attending the University of Pennsylvania. According to Oz, he proposed to her on a city street corner, using a tab from a discarded soda can as a makeshift ring. The couple have four children together, including eldest daughter Daphne, who is also an author and television host. Oz and his wife founded HealthCorps, a non-profit organization for health education and peer mentoring.

In November 2020, Oz was sued by his sister Nazlim Oz. Nazlim alleged that he was withholding her rental income from apartments owned by their late father, Mustafa Öz. Oz said that he was forced to hold payments from the apartments in escrow, as their mother and other relatives were suing Nazlim in Turkish probate court over the distribution of Mustafa Öz's estate.

=== Religion ===
As of 2022, Oz identifies as "secular Muslim" and, according to the Associated Press, "has said that the spiritual side of Islam resonates with him more than the religious law side of it." Oz aligns his personal Muslim religious views with Sufism. Oz has expressed to CBN News his opposition to Sharia law in the US. Noting that his wife and children are Christians, Oz told CBN that he believes that the U.S. was founded on Judeo-Christian values. His wife Lisa introduced Oz to the teachings of 18th-century Swedish theologian Emanuel Swedenborg, the founder of Swedenborgianism, as well as to forms of alternative medicine and Eastern mysticism such as reiki and transcendental meditation.

In a 2012 interview with Henry Louis Gates Jr., Oz said that his father strictly followed Islam, while his mother was a secular Kemalist.

== Public reception ==
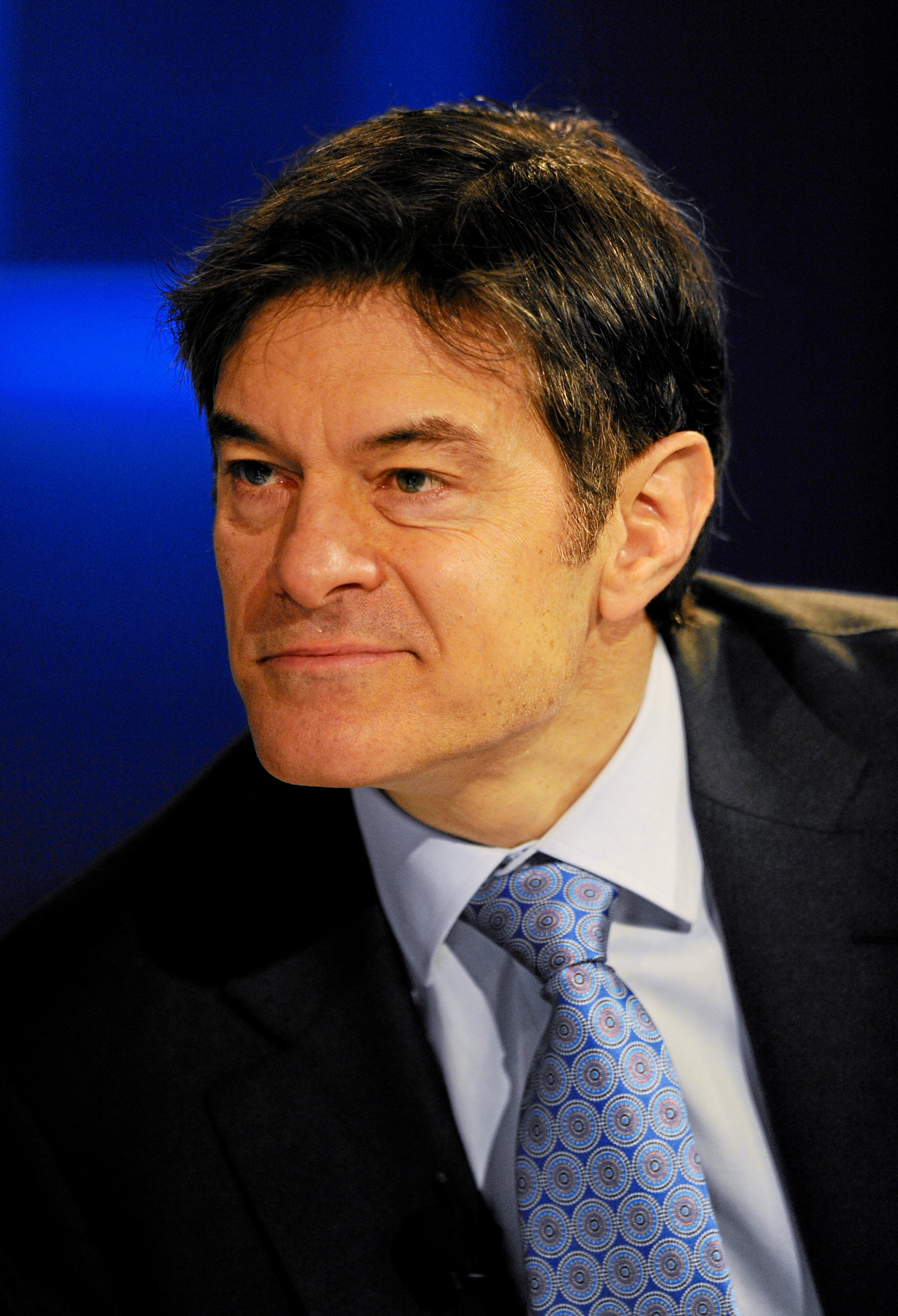
Oz at the World Economic Forum in 2012

Oz has faced criticism for his promotion of pseudoscience, including homeopathy, and alternative medicine. Popular Science and The New Yorker have published critical articles on Oz for giving non-scientific advice. HuffPost has accused Oz of promoting quackery.

A 2014 study published in the British Medical Journal found that medical talk shows such as The Dr. Oz Show and The Doctors often lack adequate information on the specific benefits or evidence of their claims. Forty episodes of each program from early 2013 were evaluated, determining that evidence supported 46 percent, contradicted 15 percent, and was not found for 39 percent of the recommendations on The Dr Oz Show. Unfounded claims included saying apple juice had unsafe levels of arsenic and cell phones could cause breast cancer.

Oz was awarded the James Randi Educational Foundation's Pigasus Award 2009 for his promotion of reiki. However, he used reiki for moral support to patients in the operating room, and claimed that he was unfairly attacked.

Oz has been criticized for the guests he has invited onto The Dr. Oz Show, including psychics, faith healers, peddlers of unproven or disproven medical treatments, and anti-vaccination activists, including Joseph Mercola, Robert F. Kennedy Jr., and Christiane Northrup.

From 1999 to 2004, Oz was named a "Global Leader of Tomorrow" by the World Economic Forum and was listed on Time Magazine's "100 Most Influential People" of 2008. He was nominated for ten Daytime Emmy Awards for Outstanding Talk Show Host with The Dr. Oz Show which aired from 2009 to 2022, and won the award four times (in 2010, 2011, 2014 and 2016).

=== Hollywood and other awards ===
Emmy Awards

Year	Award	Category	Result
2010	Daytime Emmy Awards	Outstanding Informative Talk Show Host	Won
2010	Daytime Emmy Awards	Outstanding Talk Show Informative (Note: As producer)	Nominated
2011	Daytime Emmy Awards	Outstanding Informative Talk Show Host	Won
2011	Daytime Emmy Awards	Outstanding Talk Show Informative	Won
2012	Daytime Emmy Awards	Outstanding Informative Talk Show Host	Nominated
2012	Daytime Emmy Awards	Outstanding Talk Show Informative	Won
2013	Daytime Emmy Awards	Outstanding Informative Talk Show Host	Nominated
2013	Daytime Emmy Awards	Outstanding Talk Show Informative	Won
2014	Daytime Emmy Awards	Outstanding Informative Talk Show Host	Won
2014	Daytime Emmy Awards	Outstanding Talk Show Informative	Nominated
2015	Daytime Emmy Awards	Outstanding Informative Talk Show Host	Nominated
2015	Daytime Emmy Awards	Outstanding Talk Show Informative	Nominated
2016	Daytime Emmy Awards	Outstanding Informative Talk Show Host	Won
2016	Daytime Emmy Awards	Outstanding Talk Show Informative	Nominated
2017	Daytime Emmy Awards	Outstanding Informative Talk Show Host	Nominated
2017	Daytime Emmy Awards	Outstanding Talk Show Informative	Won
2018	Daytime Emmy Awards	Outstanding Informative Talk Show Host	Nominated
2018	Daytime Emmy Awards	Outstanding Talk Show Informative	Won
2019	Daytime Emmy Awards	Outstanding Informative Talk Show Host	Nominated
2019	Daytime Emmy Awards	Outstanding Talk Show Informative	Nominated

People's Choice Awards

Year	Award	Category	Result
2016	People's Choice Awards	Favorite Daytime TV Host	Nominated

Other

Year	Award	Notes
1999–2004	Global Leader of Tomorrow	Awarded by the World Economic Forum
2022	Star on the Hollywood Walk of Fame	

== Writings ==
Eight of Oz's books have been New York Times bestsellers; seven were written with Michael F. Roizen. He has a regular column in Esquire magazine and O, The Oprah Magazine and his article "Retool, Reboot, and Rebuild" was awarded the 2009 National Magazine Award for Personal Service. Oz and the Hearst Corporation launched the bi-monthly magazine Dr. Oz The Good Life on February 4, 2014.

=== Bibliography ===
- Healing from the Heart: A Leading Surgeon Combines Eastern and Western Traditions to Create the Medicine of the Future, by Mehmet Oz, Ron Arias, Dean Ornish, 1999, ISBN 0452279550.
- Complementary and Alternative Cardiovascular Medicine: Clinical Handbook, by Richard A. Stein (Editor), Mehmet, M.D. Oz (Editor), 2004, ISBN 1588291863.
- YOU: The Owner's Manual: An Insider's Guide to the Body that Will Make You Healthier and Younger, by Michael F. Roizen, Mehmet C. Oz, 2005, ISBN 0060765313.
- YOU: On a Diet: The Owner's Manual for Waist Management, by Michael F. Roizen, Mehmet C. Oz, 2006, ISBN 0743292545.
- YOU: The Smart Patient: An Insider's Handbook for Getting the Best Treatment, by Michael F. Roizen, Mehmet C. Oz, 2006, ISBN 0743293010.
- YOU: Staying Young: The Owner's Manual for Extending Your Warranty, by Michael F. Roizen, Mehmet C. Oz, 2007, ISBN 0743292561.
- YOU: Being Beautiful: The Owner's Manual to Inner and Outer Beauty, by Michael F. Roizen, Mehmet C. Oz, 2008, ISBN 1416572341.
- YOU: Breathing Easy: Meditation and Breathing Techniques to Help You Relax, Refresh, and Revitalize, by Michael F. Roizen, Mehmet C. Oz, 2008.
- YOU: Having a Baby: The Owner's Manual from Conception to Delivery and More, by Michael F. Roizen, Mehmet C. Oz, 2009.
- Minimally Invasive Cardiac Surgery, by Mehmet C. Oz, 2010, ISBN 1617374008.
- Oz, Mehmet (2017). Food Can Fix It: The Superfood Switch to Fight Fat, Defy Aging, and Eat Your Way Healthy. New York: Scribner. ISBN 978-1-5011-5815-5.
- Roizen, Michael F.; Oz, Mehmet (2013). YOU(R) Teen: Losing Weight: The Owner's Manual to Simple and Healthy Weight Management at Any Age (1st Free Press trade paperback ed.). New York: Free Press. ISBN 978-1-4767-1357-1.
- Roizen, Michael F.; Oz, Mehmet (2011). YOU: The Owner's Manual for Teens: A Guide to a Healthy Body and Happy Life (1st Free Press hardcover ed.). New York: Free Press. ISBN 978-0-7432-9258-0.

== Filmography ==
=== Film ===
Year	Film	Credited as		Notes
Year	Film	Actor	Consultant	Notes
2002	John Q.	No	Yes	Consultant: Heart Transplantation
2017	Mom and Dad	Yes	No	Self
TBA	Trouble Down Under	Yes	No	Doc the Cattle Dog (voice)

=== Television ===
Year	Title	Role	Notes
2001	60 Minutes	Self	Episode: "The U.S. Border Patrol/The Pump/Kuwait: Ten Years Later"
2003–2004	Second Opinion with Dr. Oz	Self	5 episodes
2005	You: The Owner's Manual	Self	
2006–2011	The Oprah Winfrey Show	Self	9 episodes
2007–2008	Live with Kelly and Ryan	Self	3 episodes
2007–2009	Larry King Live	Self	7 episodes
2008–2021	Good Morning America	Self	8 episodes
2008–2020	The View	Self	11 episodes
2008; 2016	The Insider	Self	2 episodes
2008	The Colbert Report	Self	Episode: "Dr. Mehmet Oz"
2009	The Early Show	Self	Episode: "26 September 2009"
2009–2022	The Dr. Oz Show	Self	1,681 episodes
2009–2021	Jeopardy!	Guest host/video clue presenter	23 episodes
2009–2021	Entertainment Tonight	Self	12 episodes
2009–2019	Jimmy Kimmel Live!	Self	8 episodes
2009	20/20	Self	Episode: "Amanda Knox Verdict/Chris Brown/D.I.Y. Cosmetic Procedures/Indoor Tanning Salons"
2009–2011	Late Show with David Letterman	Self	3 episodes
2009–2011	Late Night with Jimmy Fallon	Self	4 episodes
2010	Faces of America with Henry Louis Gates Jr.	Self	4 episodes
2010	Saturday Night Live	Self; uncredited	Episode: "Zach Galifianakis/Vampire Weekend"
2010	Stand Up to Cancer	Self	TV special
2010	The Lisa Oz & Kim Coles Show	Self	
2010–2012	The Late Late Show with Craig Ferguson	Self	2 episodes
2010–2018	Rachael Ray	Self	15 episodes
2011	Oprah's Guide to OWN	Self	TV special
2011	The Nate Berkus Show	Self	Episode: "Dr. Oz's Must Haves for Every Home"
2011–2018	Daytime Emmy Awards	Self	Awards show; 4 years
2011	Ask Oprah's All-Stars	Self	6 episodes
2011	Hollywood Icons and Innovators	Self	Episode 1.4
2011–2012	The Soup	Self	2 episodes
2011–2019	The Wendy Williams Show	Self	9 episodes
2011–2020	Today	Self	68 episodes
2012	Chelsea Lately	Self	Episode #6.35
2012	The Hour	Self	Episode #8.147
2012	Citizen Hearst	Self	Documentary
2012	Mankind: The Story of All of Us	Self	7 episodes
2012	Erin Burnett OutFront	Self	Episode: December 18, 2012
2012–2014	NY Med	Self	6 episodes
2012–2018	Watch What Happens Live with Andy Cohen	Self	5 episodes
2013	The Doctors	Self	Episode: "High-Tech Treatments: Can They Help You?"
2013	Secret History of Humans	Self	6 episodes
2013	Big Morning Buzz Live	Self	Episode: "Dr. Oz/David Arquette/Betty Who"
2013	Who Wants to Be a Millionaire?	Contestant	2 episodes
2013	2013 Soul Train Music Awards	Self	
2013; 2016	Tavis Smiley	Self	2 episodes
2013–2021	Inside Edition	Self	13 episodes
2013–2020	Fox & Friends	Self	43 episodes
2014	The Dr. Tess Show	Self	Episode: "Guesting on the Dr. Oz Show"
2014	The Queen Latifah Show	Self	Episode: "Dr. Oz/Tim Conway/Tyrese Gibson/World-Renowned ChefWolfgang Puck"
2014	Finding Thin	Self	Documentary
2014	Late Night with Seth Meyers	Self	Episode: "Dr. Mehmet Oz/Norman Reedus/American Authors"
2014	Larry King Now	Self	Episode: "Dr. Oz"
2014	Geraldo Rivera Reports	Self	Episode: "Remembering Joan Rivers"
2014	TMZ on TV	Self	Episode: October 4, 2014
2014	Talk Stoop	Self	Episode: "Hosting the Hosts"
2014	Surgeon Oz	Self	10-episode documentary
2014–2017	The Chew	Self	6 episodes
2015; 2019	Weekend Today	Self	2 episodes
2016	Access Daily	Self	2 episodes
2016–2020	Extra	Self	10 episodes
2016	Dr. Ken	Self	Episode: "Delayed in Honolulu"
2017	Sunrise	Self	Episode: September 1, 2017
2017	Daily Pop	Self	Episode: September 19, 2017
2017	Springfield of Dreams: The Legend of Homer Simpson	Self	TV movie documentary
2017	Hollywood Christmas Parade	Self	Grand Marshal
2017	Nightcap	Self	4 episodes
2017–2018	Megyn Kelly Today	Self	4 episodes
2017; 2020	The Strip Live	Self	2 episodes
2017–2020	Access Hollywood	Self	3 episodes
2017; 2021	The $100,000 Pyramid	Self	2 episodes
2018	Morfi, todos a la mesa	Self	Episode: May 15, 2018
2018	Wheel of Fortune	Self	Episode: "Gone Fishing 1"
2018	The Marilyn Denis Show	Self	Episode: 9.18
2018	Tanked	Self	Episode: "The Wonderful Dr. Oz Tank"
2018	Crashing	Self	Episode: "Pete and Leif"
2018–2019	Celebrity Page	Self	2 episodes
2019	NBA on ESPN	Self	Episode: "2019 Celebrity Game"
2019	Race Against Time	Self	Documentary
2019	The Ellen DeGeneres Show	Self	Episode: "Ali Wong and Dr. Mehmet Oz"
2020	Mastercast Live	Self	Episode: "Mehmet Oz (showcase) on MASTERCAST LIVE"
2020	Fox Files	Self	Episode: "America vs. Virus"
2020	The Ingraham Angle	Self	Episode: March 23, 2020
2020	Good Day New York	Self	2 episodes
2020	Match Game	Self	Episode: "James Van Der Beek, Cheryl Hines, Thomas Lennon, Sherri Shepherd, Dr. Oz, Laura Benanti"
2020	The Issue Is	Self	3 episodes
2020–2021	Hannity	Self	13 episodes
2021	Dr. Phil	Self	Episode: "Dr. Phil and Dr. Oz Fight Fraudsters!"
2021	Inside Edition Weekend	Self	2 episodes
2021	The Drew Barrymore Show	Self	Episode: "Dr. Oz"
2021	Dish Nation	Self	Episode: 10.62

== Electoral history ==
2022 U.S. Senate Republican primary in Pennsylvania
Party	Candidate	Votes	%
Republican	Mehmet Oz	420,168	31.2
Republican	David McCormick	419,218	31.1
Republican	Kathy Barnette	331,903	24.7
Republican	Carla Sands	73,360	5.4
Republican	Jeff Bartos	66,684	5.0
Republican	Sean Gale	20,266	1.5
Republican	George Bochetto	14,492	1.1
Total votes		1,346,091	100.0

2022 United States Senate election in Pennsylvania
Party	Candidate	Votes	%
Democratic	John Fetterman	2,751,012	51.2
Republican	Mehmet Oz	2,487,260	46.3
Libertarian	Erik Gerhardt	72,887	1.3
Green	Richard L. Weiss	30,434	0.5
Keystone	Dan Wassmer	26,428	0.4
Total votes		5,368,021	100.0
Democratic gain from Republican			

== See also ==
- List of American Muslims
- Medical journalism

== Notes ==
Party political offices
Preceded by Pat Toomey	Republican nominee for U.S. Senator from Pennsylvania (Class 3); 2022	Most recent
