= WebMD =

American corporation which provides health information services

WebMD Health Corp.
- Website type: Subsidiary
- Founded: June 14, 1996; 30 years ago (as Healthscape)
- Headquarters: New York City, New York, U.S.
- Key people: Robert N. Brisco (CEO)
- Services: Healthcare information
- Revenue: US$636 million (2024)
- Employees: 2,060 (2024)
- Parent: Internet Brands
- Website: www.webmd.com

WebMD is an American corporation which publishes online news and information about human health and well-being. The WebMD website also includes information about drugs and is an important healthcare information website and the most popular consumer-oriented health site.

WebMD was started in 1998 by internet entrepreneur Jeff Arnold. In early 1999, it was part of a three-way merger with Sapient Health Network (SHN) and Direct Medical Knowledge (DMK). SHN began in Portland, Oregon, in 1996 by Jim Kean, Bill Kelly, and Kris Nybakken, who worked together at a CD-ROM publishing firm, Creative Multimedia. Later, in 1999, WebMD merged with Healtheon, founded by Netscape Communications founder James H. Clark.

== History ==
WebMD is best known as a health information services website, which publishes content regarding health and health care topics, including a symptom checklist, pharmacy information, drugs information, and blogs of physicians with specific topics, and provides a place to store personal medical information. URAC, the Utilization Review Accreditation Commission, has accredited WebMD's operations continuously since 2001 regarding everything from proper disclosures and health content to security and privacy.

The company reported $705 million in revenue for the year 2016. In 2017, Internet Brands, a company owned by private-equity firm Kohlberg Kravis Roberts (KKR) agreed to purchase WebMD Health Corporation for approximately $2.8 billion.

In May 2021, WebMD acquired the print magazine and website for patients with ADHD and parents of children with ADHD, ADDitude. In August 2022, WebMD acquired the leading French medical news site Jim.fr.

== Company ==
WebMD is financed by advertising, third-party contributions, and sponsors. Some of the sponsors have influence over the content on WebMD. In 2013, the Chicago Tribune reported that WebMD, "has struggled with a fall in advertising revenue with pharmaceutical companies slashing marketing budgets as several blockbuster drugs go off patent." In response, WebMD began investing in changes to its site in order to entice users who use its site seeking specific information to linger on the site reviewing other material.

WebMD offers services to physicians and private clients. They publish WebMD the Magazine, a patient-directed publication distributed bimonthly free of charge to 85 percent of physician waiting rooms. Medscape is a professional portal for physicians and has training materials, a drug database, and clinical information on 30 medical specialty areas and more than 30 physician discussion boards. WebMD Health Services provides private health management programs and benefit decision-support portals to employers and health plans.

The WebMD Health Network operates WebMD Health and other health-related sites including: Medscape, MedicineNet, eMedicine, eMedicineHealth, RxList, OnHealth, and theheart.org. These sites provide similar services to those of WebMD. MedicineNet is an online media publishing company. Medscape offers up-to-date information for physicians and other healthcare professionals. RxList offers detailed information about pharmaceutical information on generic and name-brand drugs. eMedicineHealth is a consumer site offering similar information to that of WebMD. It was first based on the site created for physicians, dentists and other healthcare professionals called eMedicine.com.

WebMD China is operated by an unaffiliated online publishing group, and is not part of the WebMD Health Network.

== Criticism ==
Writing in The New York Times Magazine in 2011, Virginia Heffernan criticized WebMD for biasing readers toward drugs that are sold by the site's pharmaceutical sponsors, even when they are unnecessary. She wrote that WebMD "has become permeated with pseudo-medicine and subtle misinformation."

Julia Belluz of Vox criticized WebMD in 2016 for encouraging hypochondria and for promoting treatments for which evidence of safety and effectiveness is weak or non-existent, such as green coffee supplements for weight loss, vagus nerve stimulation for depression, and fish-oil/omega-3 supplements for high cholesterol.

In 2016, a survey of doctors found WebMD and its sister company Medscape to have incomplete medical information lacking depth and also numerous cases of misinformation on their sites. A study of Medscape and WebMD also found both services to lack neutrality and exhibiting bias potentially based on very high payments (compared to their industry competitors) from the pharmaceutical industry.
