= Elizabeth Rona =

Hungarian chemist (1890–1981)

- Born: Erzsébet Róna; 20 March 1890; Budapest, Hungary, Austria-Hungary
- Died: 27 July 1981 (aged 91); Oak Ridge, Tennessee, U.S.
- Other name: Elisabeth Róna
- Education: University of Budapest
- Known for: Polonium extraction
- Scientific career
- Fields: Nuclear chemistry

Elizabeth Rona (20 March 1890 – 27 July 1981) was a Hungarian nuclear chemist, known for her work with radioactive isotopes. After developing an enhanced method of preparing polonium samples, she was recognized internationally as the leading expert in isotope separation and polonium preparation. Between 1914 and 1918, during her postdoctoral study with George de Hevesy, she developed a theory that the velocity of diffusion depended on the mass of the nuclides. As only a few atomic elements had been identified, her confirmation of the existence of "Uranium-Y" (now known as thorium-231) was a major contribution to nuclear chemistry. She was awarded the Haitinger Prize by the Austrian Academy of Sciences in 1933.

After immigrating to the United States in 1941, she was granted a Carnegie Fellowship to continue her research and provided technical information on her polonium extraction methods to the Manhattan Project. Later in her career, she became a nuclear chemistry professor at the Oak Ridge Institute of Nuclear Studies and after 15 years there transferred to the Institute of Marine Sciences at the University of Miami. At both Oak Ridge and Miami, she continued her work on the geochronology of seabed elements and radiometric dating. She was posthumously inducted into the Tennessee Women's Hall of Fame in 2015.

== Early life and education ==
Elizabeth Rona was born on 20 March 1890 in Budapest, Hungary, to Ida, (née Mahler) and Samuel Róna. Her father was a prosperous Jewish physician who worked with Louis Wickham and Henri-August Dominici, founders of radium therapy, to introduce the techniques to Budapest, and installed one of the first x-ray machines there. Elizabeth wanted to become a physician like her father, but Samuel believed that it would be too difficult for a woman to attain. Though he died when she was in her second year of university, Rona's father had encouraged her and spurred her interest in science from a young age. She enrolled in the Philosophy Faculty at the University of Budapest, studying chemistry, geochemistry, and physics, receiving her PhD in 1912.

== Early career ==
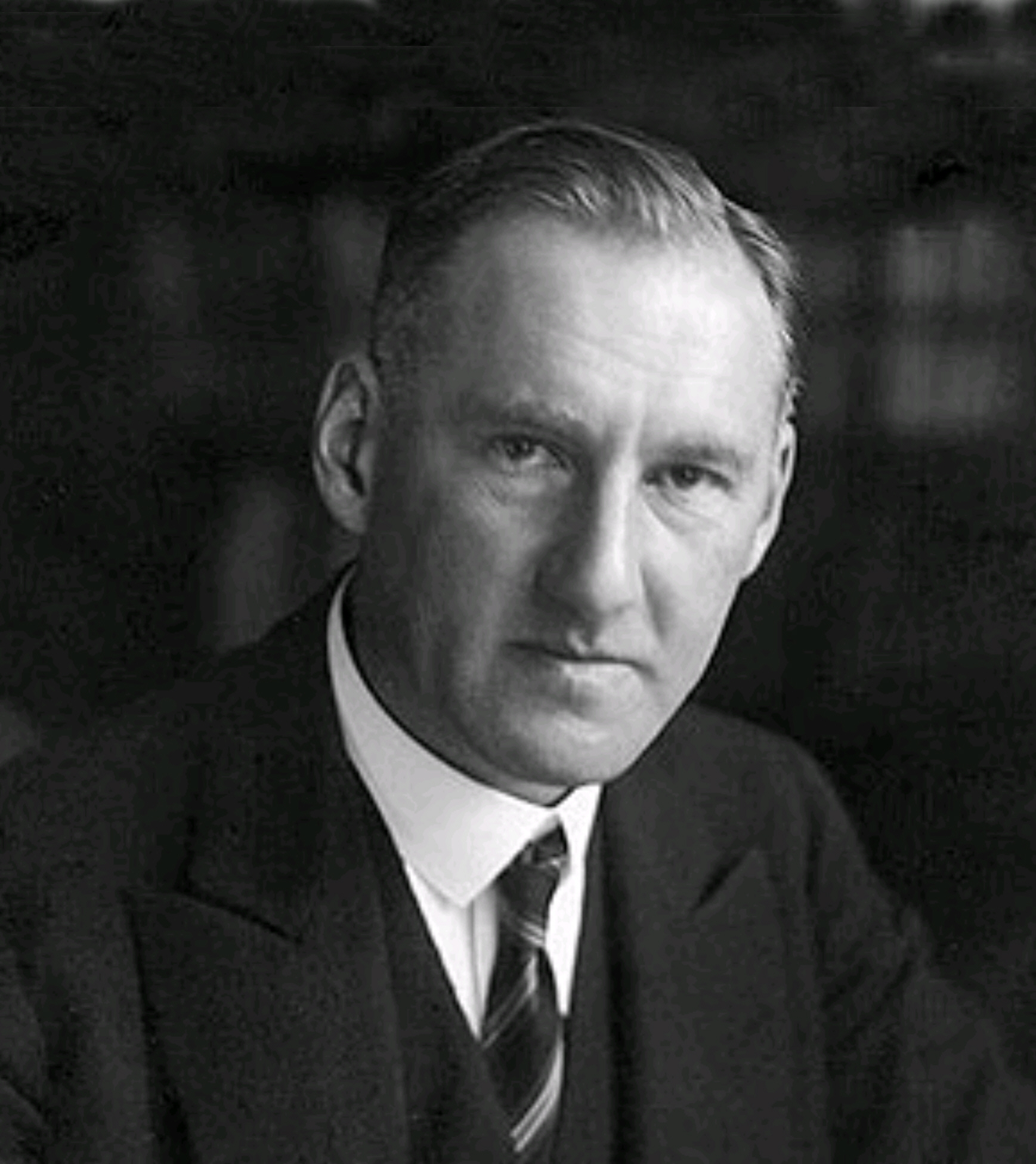
Kasimir Fajans, ca. 1938, Rona's postdoctoral instructor

Rona began her postdoctoral training in 1912 at the Animal Physiology Institute in Berlin and the Kaiser Wilhelm Institute, studying yeast as a reagent. In 1913 she transferred to Karlsruhe University, working under the direction of Kasimir Fajans, the discoverer of isotopes, for the next eight months. During the summer of 1914, she studied at University College London, but returned to Budapest at the outbreak of World War I. Taking a position at Budapest's Chemical Institute, she completed a scientific paper on the "diffusion constant of radon in water". Working with George de Hevesy, she was asked to verify a new element — at the time was termed Uranium-Y, now known as Th-231. Though others had failed to confirm the element, Rona was able to separate the Uranium-Y from interfering elements, proving it was a beta emitter (β-emission) with a half-life of 25 hours. The Hungarian Academy of Sciences published her findings. Rona first coined the terms "isotope labels" and "tracers" during this study, noting that the velocity of diffusion depended on the mass of the nuclides. Though contained in a footnote, this was the basis for the development of the mass spectrographic and heavy water studies later performed by other scientists. In addition to her scientific proficiency, Rona spoke English, French, German, and Hungarian.

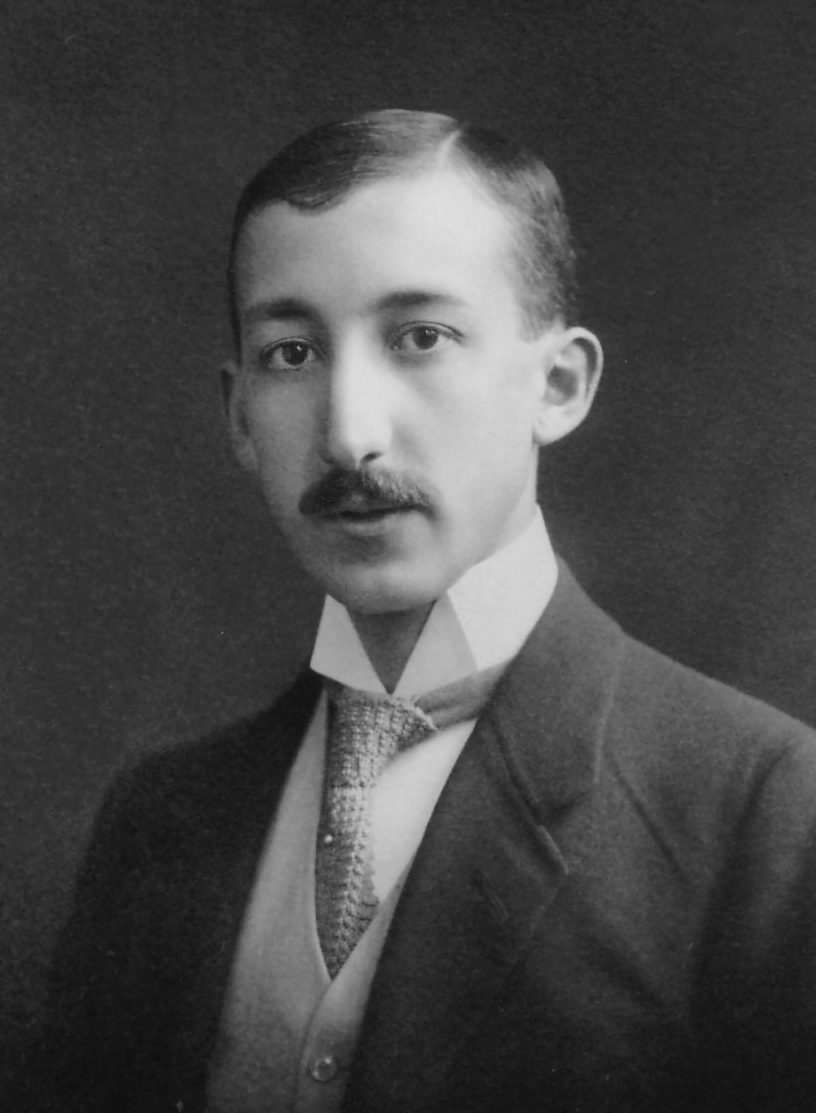
George de Hevesy, ca. 1913

When Hevesy left Budapest, in 1918 Franz Tangl, a noted biochemist and physiologist of the University of Budapest, offered Rona a teaching position. She taught chemistry to selected students whom Tangl felt had insufficient knowledge to complete the course work, becoming the first woman to teach chemistry at university level in Hungary.

The apartment in which Rona and her mother were living was seized when the communists invaded Hungary in 1919. Owing to political instability and the persecution of those with communist sympathies during the countering White Terror, an increasing amount of work at the Institute fell to Rona. When offered a position in 1921 to return to Dahlem and the Kaiser Wilhelm Institute, by Otto Hahn, Rona resigned. She joined Hahn's staff in Berlin to separate ionium (now known as Th-230) from uranium. Hyperinflation in the Weimar Republic forced her transfer to the Textile Fiber Institute of Kaiser Wilhelm, as practical research was the only work permitted at the time. Theoretical research with no essential application was not a priority. Her training allowed her to return to a more stable Hungary and accept a position in a textile factory there in 1923. She did not care for the work and soon left, joining the staff of the Institute for Radium Research of Vienna in 1924 at the request of Stefan Meyer. Her research there focused on measuring the absorption and range of hydrogen rays, as well as on developing polonium as an alternative radioactive material to radium.

== Austria ==
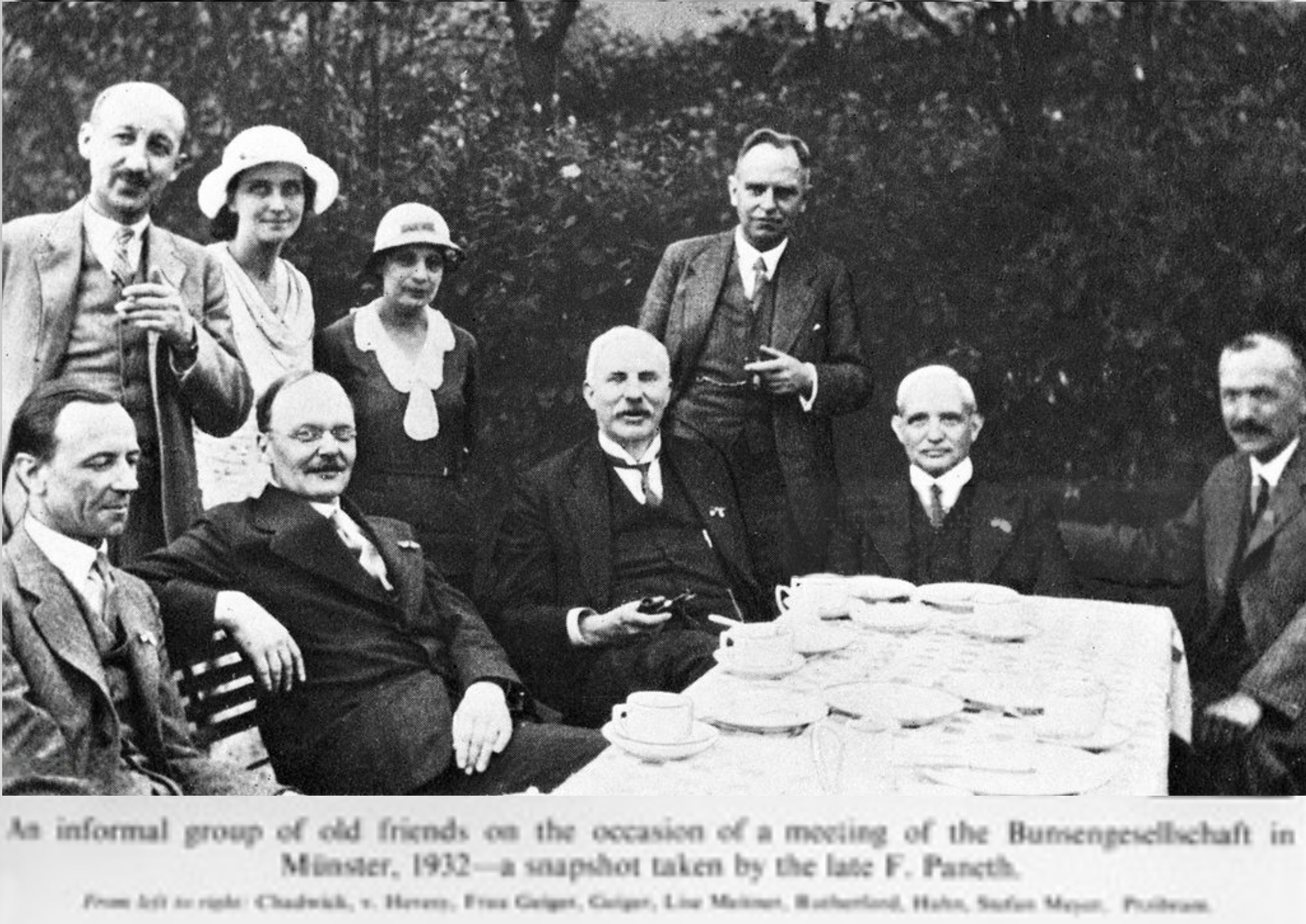
Standing, l. to r.: George de Hevesy, Mrs. Geiger, Lise Meitner, Otto Hahn. Seated, l. to r.: James Chadwick, Hans Geiger, Ernest Rutherford, Stefan Meyer, Karl Przibram, International Bunsentagung on Radioactivity in Münster (16–19 May 1932)

As early as 1926, Meyer had written to Irène Joliot-Curie suggesting that Rona work with her to learn how his laboratory could make their own polonium samples. Once Hans Pettersson was able to secure funds to pay Rona's expenses, Joliot-Curie allowed her to come and study polonium separation at the Curie Institute in Paris. Rona developed an enhanced method of preparing polonium sources and producing alpha-emissions.(α-emission). Gaining recognition as an expert in the field, she took those skills back to the Radium Institute along with a small disc of polonium. This disc allowed her to create lab specimens of polonium, which were used in much of the Institute's subsequent research.

Her skills were in high demand and she formed many collaborations in Vienna, working with Ewald Schmidt on the modification of Paul Bonét-Maury's method of vaporizing polonium; with Marietta Blau on photographic emulsions of hydrogen rays; and with Hans Pettersson. In 1928, Pettersson asked her to analyze a sample of sea bottom sediment to determine its radium content. Because the lab she was working in was contaminated, she took the samples to the oceanographic laboratory at Bornö Marine Research Station on Stora Bornö in Gullmarsfjorden, Sweden, which would become her summer research destination for the next 12 years. Her analyses with Berta Karlik on the half-lives of uranium, thorium, and actinium decay identified radiometric dating and elemental alpha particle ranges. In 1933, Rona and Karlik won the Austrian Academy of Sciences Haitinger Prize.

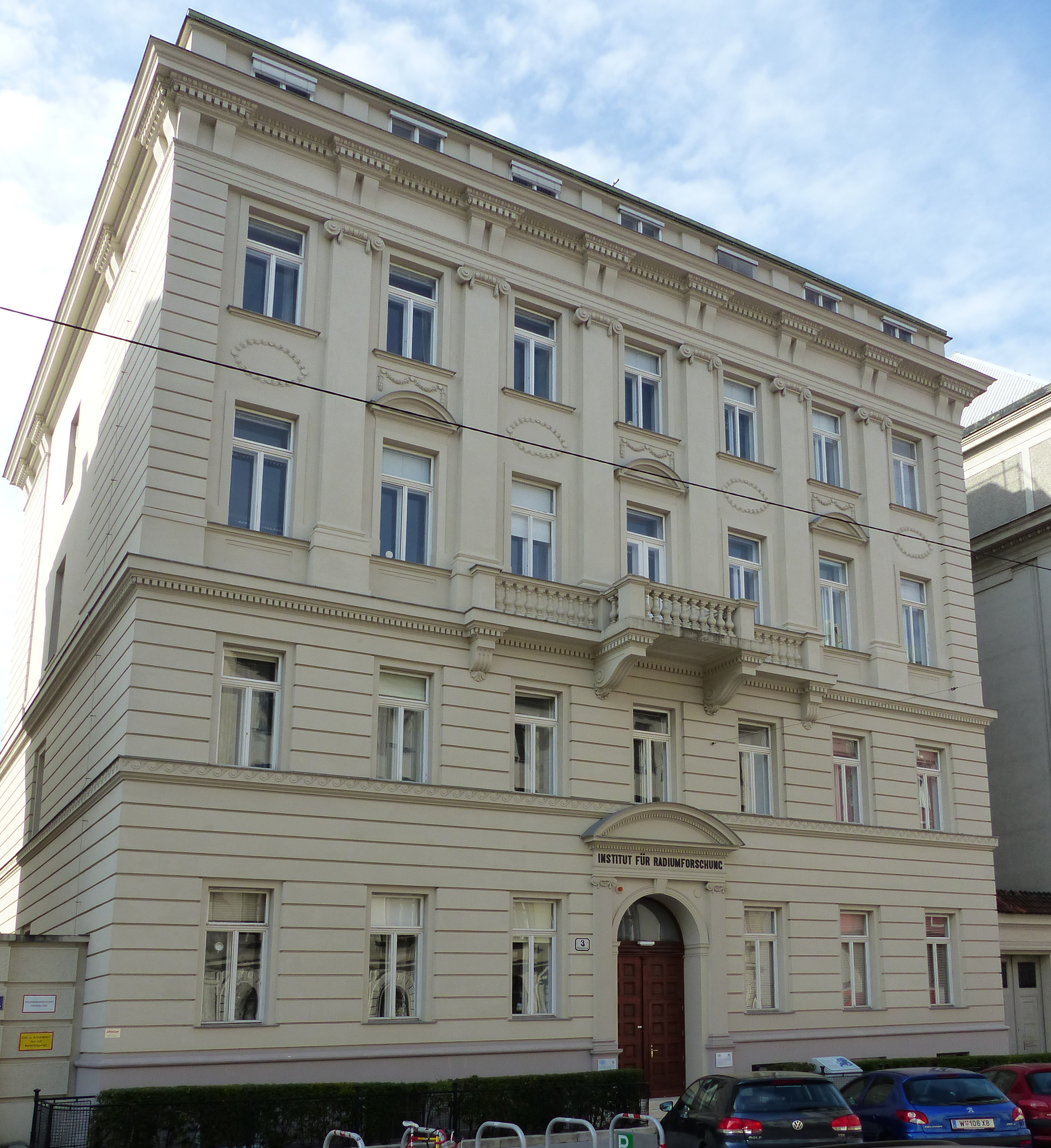
Institute for Radium Research, Vienna

In 1934, Rona was back in Paris studying with Joliot-Curie, who had discovered artificial radioactivity. Soon after, Curie died and Rona became ill, but she was able to return to Vienna late the following year to share what had been learned with a group of researchers made up of Pettersson, Elizabeth Kara-Michailova, and Ernst Føyn, who was serving as an assistant to Ellen Gleditsch at that time. Their studies centered on research of the effect caused by bombarding radionuclides with neutrons. In 1935 Rona consolidated some of these relationships, working on Stora Bornö, then visiting Gleditsch in Oslo, then traveling to Copenhagen to see Hevesy, and later to Kålhuvudet, Sweden to meet with Karlik and Pettersson. One of the projects the group had been working on for several years was to determine if there was any correlation between water depth and radium content, and their seawater research evaluated the concentration of elements in seawater collected from different locations.

After the 1938 Anschluss, Rona and Marietta Blau left the Radium Institute because of their Jewish heritage and the antisemitic persecution they experienced in the laboratory. Rona first returned to Budapest and worked in an industrial laboratory, but within a few months, the position was eliminated. She worked from October to December 1938 in Sweden, and then accepted a temporary position for one year at the University of Oslo, which had been offered by Gleditsch. Reluctant to leave her home, at the end of her year in Oslo, Rona returned to Hungary. She was appointed to a position at the Radium-Cancer Hospital in Budapest, preparing radium for medicinal purposes.

== Emigration ==
Faced with encroaching Russians on one side and the Nazi involvement in Hungary during World War II on the other, in early 1941 Rona obtained a visitor's visa and fled to the United States. For three months she was unemployed and suspected of being a spy, though she sought help from scientists she had worked with in Europe to find employment. At a meeting of the American Physical Society, she met Austrian physicist Karl Herzfeld, who helped her secure a teaching post at Trinity College in Washington, D.C. During this period, she was awarded a Carnegie Fellowship to research at the Geophysical Laboratory of the Carnegie Institute, working on analysis of seawater and sediments. Between 1941 and 1942, she conducted work at Carnegie in conjunction with the Woods Hole Oceanographic Institution, measuring the amount of radium in seawater and river water. Her study, completed in 1942, showed that the ratio of radium to uranium was lower in seawater and higher in river water.

After returning from a summer visit to Los Altos, California, Rona received a vague telegram from the Institute of Optics at the University of Rochester referencing war work and polonium, but no details of an assignment. When Rona responded that she would be interested in helping with the war effort but had immigration issues, Brian O'Brien appeared in her office and explained the nature of the confidential work for the Manhattan Project. They proposed buying her method of polonium extraction and gave specific instructions for the type of assistants she might use – someone unfamiliar with chemistry or physics. Her non-citizen status did not preclude her from working for the Office of Scientific Research and Development (OSRD), to which she gave her methods without compensation. Before the Manhattan Project, polonium had been used only in small samples, but the project proposed to use both polonium and beryllium to create a reaction forcing neutrons to be ejected and ignite the fission reaction required for the atom bomb. Plutonium plants, based on her specifications for what was needed to process element, were built in the New Mexico desert at Los Alamos National Laboratory, but Rona was given no details.

Rona's methods were also used as part of the experiments conducted by the Office of Human Radiation Experiments to determine the effects of human exposure to radiation. Early in her career, she had been exposed to the dangers of radium. Rona's requests for protective gas masks were denied, as Stefan Meyer downplayed the hazards of exposure. She purchased protective gear with her own money, not believing there was no danger. When vials of radioactive material exploded and the laboratory became contaminated, Rona was convinced her mask had saved her. Gleditsch had also warned her of the dangers the year Rona was sick and living in Paris, when Joliot-Curie died, emphasizing the risk of radium-related anemia. In her 1978 book about her experiences, Rona wrote about the damage to bones, hands, and lungs of the scientists studying radioactivity. Since they wore no gloves and frequently poured substances between vials without protection, she noted that their thumbs, forefingers, and ring fingers were often damaged. The secrecy surrounding the project makes it difficult to know if any of the scientists not directly working on any project knew specifically what their contributions were being used for.

== Later career ==
Rona continued teaching until 1946 at Trinity. In 1947, she began working at the Argonne National Laboratory. Her work there focused on ion exchange reactions and she published several works for the United States Atomic Energy Commission. In 1948, she became a naturalized U.S. citizen. In 1950, she began research work at the Oak Ridge Institute of Nuclear Studies as a chemist and senior scientist in nuclear studies. During this period, she collaborated with Texas A&M University on the geochronology of seabed sediments, dating core samples by estimating their radioactive decay. She retired from Oak Ridge in 1965 and then went to work at the University of Miami, teaching at the Institute of Marine Sciences where she worked for a decade. Rona retired for a second time in 1976 and returned to Tennessee in the late 1970s, publishing a book in 1978 on her radioactive tracer methods.

Rona died on 27 July 1981 in Oak Ridge, Tennessee.

== Legacy ==
Rona did not receive full acknowledgment for her accomplishments during her era. She was posthumously inducted into the Tennessee Women's Hall of Fame in 2015. In 2019 she finally received an obituary in the New York Times, as part of their Overlooked series.

== Selected works ==
- Róna, Erzsébet (1912). A bróm és az egyértékű aliphás alkoholok (PhD) (in Hungarian). Budapest, Hungary: Budapesti Tudományegyetem.
- Róna, E. (1914). "Az urán átalakulásairól". Mathematikai és Természettudományi Értesítő (in Hungarian). 35. Budapest, Hungary: 350.
- Róna, E. (1914). "I. Über die Reduktion des Zimtaldehyds durch Hefe. II. Vergärung von Benzylbrenztraubensäure". Biochemische Zeitschrift (in German). 67: 137–142.
- Róna, E. (1917). "A rádium-emanáczió diffúzióállandója és atomátmérője". Magyar Chemiai Folyóirat (in Hungarian). 23. Budapest, Hungary: 156.
- Róna, Elisabeth (11 February 1922). "Über den Ionium-Gehalt in Radium-Rückständen". Berichte der Deutschen Chemischen Gesellschaft (A and B Series) (in German). 55 (2): 294–301. doi:10.1002/cber.19220550203.
- Róna, Elisabeth (1926). Absorptions- und Reichweitenbestimmungen an "natürlichen" H-Strahlen (in German). Vienna, Austria: Hölder-Pichler-Tempsky A.G. OCLC 72698422.
- Róna, Elisabeth; Schmidt, Ewald A W (1927). Untersuchungen über das Eindringen des Poloniums in Metalle (in German). Vienna, Austria: Hölder-Pichler-Tempsky A.G. OCLC 72698433.
- Róna, Elisabeth; Schmidt, Ewald A. W. (1928). "Eine Methode zur Herstellung von hochkonzentrierten Poloniumpräparaten". Sitzungsberichte Akademie der Wissenschaften (in German). 2A (137). Vienna, Austria: Math-naturwissenschaften: 103–115.
- Róna, Elisabeth (1928). "Zur Herstellung von Polonium aus Radiumverbindungen und aktiven Bleisalzen (Mitteilungen des Institutes für Radiumforschung 217". Sitzungsberichte Akademie der Wissenschaften (in German). 2A (137). Vienna, Austria: Math-naturwissenschaften: 227–234.
- Blau, Marietta; Róna, Elisabeth (1930). "Anwendung der Chamié'schen photographischen Methode zur Prüfung des chemischen Verhaltens von Polonium". Sitzungsberichte Akademie der Wissenschaften (in German). 2A (139). Vienna, Austria: Math-naturwissenschaften: 276–279.
- Rona, Elizabeth; Rieder, Fritz (1932). Untersuchungen über Reichweiten von Alpha-Strahlen der Actinium-Folgeprodukte (in German). Vienna, Austria: Hölder-Pichler-Tempsky. OCLC 457925762.
- Róna, Elisabeth; Hoffer, Margarete (1935). Verdampfungsversuche an Polonium in Sauerstoff und Stickstoff (in German). Vienna, Austria: Hölder-Pichler-Tempsky A.G. OCLC 72698437.
- Róna, Elisabeth; Neuninger, Elisabeth (1936). Beiträge zur Frage der künstlichen Aktivität des Thoriums (in German). Vienna, Austria: Hölder-Pichler-Tempsky A.G. OCLC 72698423.
- Róna, Elisabeth; Scheichenberger, Herta; Stangl, Robert (1938). Weitere Beiträge zur Frage der künstlichen Aktivität des Thoriums (in German). Vienna, Austria: Hölder-Pichler-Tempsky A.G. OCLC 72698425.
- Rona, Elizabeth; Föyn, Ernst; Karlik, Berta; Pettersson, Hans (1939). The Radioactivity of seawater. Göteborg, Sweden: Elanders boktryck. OCLC 459915451.
- Rona, Elizabeth (1948). Argonne National Laboratory (ed.). Exchange reactions of uranium ions in solution. Oak Ridge, Tennessee: U.S. Atomic Energy Commission. OCLC 702211487.
- Rona, Elizabeth (1949). Argonne National Laboratory (ed.). Some aspects of isotopic exchange reactions. Oak Ridge, Tennessee: U.S. Atomic Energy Commission. OCLC 794877518.
- Rona, Elizabeth; Gilpatrick, L O; Jeffrey, Lela M (December 1956). "Uranium determination in sea water". Eos, Transactions, American Geophysical Union. 37 (6). Washington, D.C.: American Geophysical Union: 697–701. Bibcode:1956TrAGU..37..697R. doi:10.1029/tr037i006p00697. ISSN 0002-8606.
- Rona, Elizabeth (October 1957). "A method to determine the isotopic ratio of Thorium-232 to Thorium-230 in minerals". Eos, Transactions, American Geophysical Union. 38 (5). Washington, D.C.: American Geophysical Union: 754–759. Bibcode:1957TrAGU..38..754R. doi:10.1029/tr038i005p00754. ISSN 0002-8606.
- Rona, Elizabeth; Hood, Donald W; Muse, Lowell; Buglio, Benjamin (April 1962). "Activation Analysis of Manganese and Zinc in Sea Water". Limnology and Oceanography. 7 (2). Washington, D.C.: Association for the Sciences of Limnology and Oceanography, Inc.: 201–206. Bibcode:1962LimOc...7..201R. doi:10.4319/lo.1962.7.2.0201. ISSN 1939-5590.
- Rona, Elizabeth; Akers, L K; Noakes, John E; Supernaw, Irwin (1963). "Geochronology in the Gulf of Mexico. Part I". Progress in Oceanography. 3. Philadelphia, Pennsylvania: Elsevier: 289–295. Bibcode:1963PrOce...3..289R. doi:10.1016/0079-6611(65)90024-8. ISSN 0079-6611.
- Rona, Elizabeth (26 June 1964). "Geochronology of Marine and Fluvial Sediments". Science. 144 (3626). Washington, D.C.: American Association for the Advancement of Science: 1595–1597. Bibcode:1964Sci...144.1595R. doi:10.1126/science.144.3626.1595. ISSN 0036-8075. PMID 17741249.
- Rona, Elizabeth (July 1967). Natural radioactive elements in marine environment (Report). Miami, Florida: Atomic Energy Commission.
- Rona, Elizabeth (1978). How it came about: radioactivity, nuclear physics, atomic energy. Oak Ridge, Tennessee: Oak Ridge Associated Universities. ISBN 978-0-930-78003-6.

== See also ==
- List of women associated with Marie Curie and Irène Joliot-Curie
- Timeline of women in science

== Bibliography ==
- Brucer, Marshall (1982). "In Memoriam: Elizabeth Rona (1891?–1981)" (PDF). The Journal of Nuclear Medicine. 23 (1). Reston, Virginia: Society of Nuclear Medicine and Molecular Imaging. ISSN 0161-5505.
- Carnegie Institution of Washington (1947). Year book No. 46 July 1, 1946 – June 30, 1947 (PDF) (Report). Washington, D.C.: Carnegie Institution.
- Des Jardins, Julie (2010). The Madame Curie Complex: The Hidden History of Women in Science (PDF). New York City, New York: The Feminist Press. ISBN 978-1-558-61655-4 – via Project MUSE.
- Howes, Ruth H.; Herzenberg, Caroline L. (2003). Their Day in the Sun: Women of the Manhattan Project. Philadelphia, Pennsylvania: Temple University Press. ISBN 978-1-59213-192-1.
- Ogilvie, Marilyn; Harvey, Joy (16 December 2003). The Biographical Dictionary of Women in Science: Pioneering Lives From Ancient Times to the Mid-20th Century. Routledge. ISBN 978-1-135-96343-9.
- Radnóti, Katalin (December 2014). "Götz Irén és Róna Erzsébet munkássága" (PDF). Nukleon (in Hungarian). 7 (171). Budapest, Hungary: Magyar Nukleáris Társaság, Eötvös Loránd University.
- Rayner-Canham, Marelene F.; Rayner-Canham, Geoffrey W. (1997). Devotion to Their Science: Pioneer Women of Radioactivity. Montreal, Canada: McGill-Queen's Press – MQUP. ISBN 978-0-7735-6658-3.
- Rayner-Canham, Marelene F.; Rayner-Canham, Marelene; Rayner-Canham, Geoffrey (2001). Women in Chemistry: Their Changing Roles from Alchemical Times to the Mid-twentieth Century. Philadelphia, Pennsylvania: Chemical Heritage Foundation. ISBN 978-0-941901-27-7.
- Rentetzi, Maria (September 2004). "Gender, Politics, and Radioactivity Research in Interwar Vienna The Case of the Institute for Radium Research". Isis. 95 (3). Chicago, Illinois: History of Science Society, University of Chicago Press: 359–93. doi:10.1086/428960. hdl:11858/00-001M-0000-002A-A87B-1. JSTOR 10.1086/428960. PMID 15747771. S2CID 6024845.
- Rentetzi, Maria (2008). Trafficking materials and gendered experimental practices: radium research in early 20th century Vienna. New York City, New York: Columbia University Press. ISBN 978-0-231-13558-0.
- Vámos, Éva (2011). "Erzsébet (Elizabeth) Róna (1890–1981)". In Apotheker, Jan; Sarkadi, Livia Simon (eds.). European Women in Chemistry. Weinheim, Germany: John Wiley & Sons. ISBN 978-3-527-63646-4.
