= Bornö Marine Research Station =

Research station in Sweden

- Bornö hydrografiska fältstation
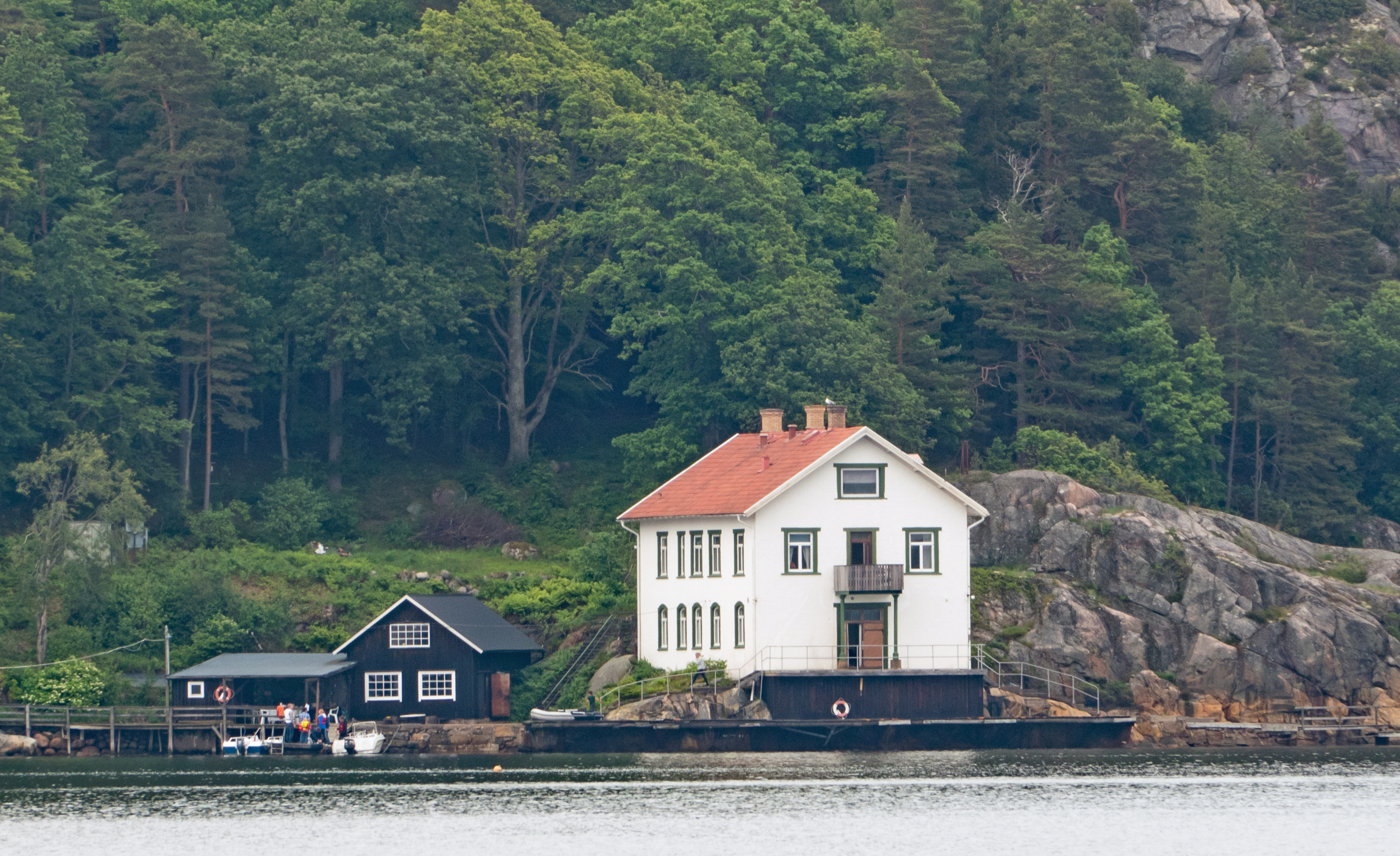
- Bornö Marine Research Station
- Established: 1902; 124 years ago
- Research type: Oceanic
- Location: Sweden; 58°22′48″N 11°34′48″E
- Website: bornoinstitute.se

Map
- Location within Sweden

Bornö Marine Research Station, owned by the Bornö Institute for Ocean and Climate Studies, is located at Holma on the island Stora Bornö in Gullmarsfjorden, about 100 km (62 mi) north of Gothenburg, Sweden. It was built in 1902 by Otto Pettersson and Gustaf Ekman, both pioneers of Swedish marine research. The island has been considered by many Swedes to be the birthplace of Swedish oceanography.

== Description ==
The station grounds, covering 19,000 m^{2} (200,000 sq ft), are a nature reserve. It is currently owned and operated by a foundation named the Bornö Institute for Ocean and Climate Studies and provides educational facilities for the University of Gothenburg. It is also available to let to companies or organizations for field courses, research, instrument development or national and international meetings.

The upper floors contain eight bedrooms housing 15 beds, as well as two kitchens. On the ground floor are four office spaces and a lecture hall with accommodations for 25 people.

== History ==
The station was originally built in response to the agreements of the International Council for the Exploration of the Sea (ICES) signed in Copenhagen in 1902 between Denmark, Finland, Germany, the Netherlands, Norway, Sweden, Russia, and the United Kingdom.

It was built with funding from Pettersson and Ekman, on Pettersson's land, and then rented to the Swedish Hydrographic Biological Commission (SHBK) to conduct studies on oceans and climate. In 1931, Pettersson's son Hans, who was a professor at the University of Gothenburg expanded the research on the island and then in 1932 the SHBK was able to purchase the island for the government.

Beginning in 1908, Otto Pettersson collected daily records on the temperature and salinity of the waters at the Bornö Station. With few interruptions, mostly during World War I and World War II, these daily observations continued until the 1980s. Petterson also discovered internal tidal waves by studying variations of the boundary surfaces between the brackish and ocean waters, which led him to develop a photographic current meter. When his son took over the investigations at the institute in the 1930s, he began to focus on the radioactive dating of sediments and forged research collaborations with the scientists at the Institute for Radium Research of Vienna.

The northwest part of Stora Bornö

== Bibliography ==
- Fonselius, Stig (2001). "History of Hydrographic Research in Sweden" (PDF). Proceedings of the Estonian Academy of Sciences, Biology and Ecology. 50 (2). Tallinn, Estonia: Estonian Academy Publishers: 110–129. doi:10.3176/biol.ecol.2001.2.04. ISSN 1406-0914.
- Leppäranta, Matti; Myrberg, Kai (2009). Physical Oceanography of the Baltic Sea. Berlin, Germany: Springer Science & Business Media. ISBN 978-3-540-79703-6.
- Rentetzi, Maria (September 2004). "Gender, Politics, and Radioactivity Research in Interwar Vienna The Case of the Institute for Radium Research". Isis. 95 (3). Chicago, Illinois: History of Science Society, University of Chicago Press: 359–93. doi:10.1086/428960. hdl:11858/00-001M-0000-002A-A87B-1. JSTOR 10.1086/428960. PMID 15747771. S2CID 6024845.
