= Holma, Lysekil Municipality =

Holma Holma säteri
- Seat farm
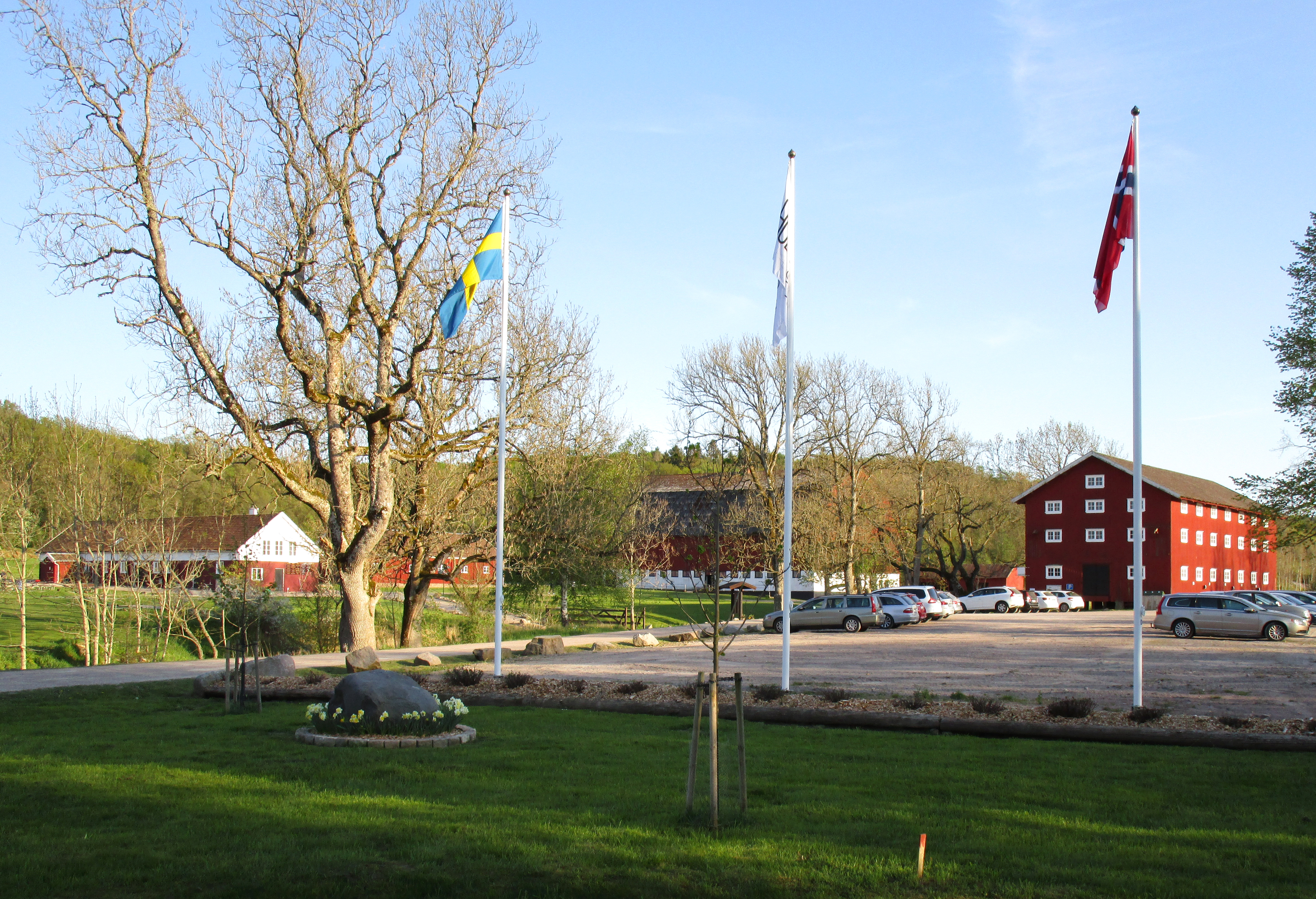
- Holma manor

- Location in Västra Götaland County
- Coordinates: 58°22′46″N 11°33′43″E
- Country: Sweden
- Province: Bohuslän
- County: Västra Götaland County
- Municipality: Lysekil Municipality
- Established: 15th century
- Time zone: CET
  - Summer (DST): UTC+2 (CEST)
- Website: www.lysekil.se

Holma is a seat farm in Brastad socken, Lysekil Municipality, Sweden, by the shore of Gullmarn fjord. It was established in the 15th century. Since then, a number of Danish, Norwegian and Swedish noble families, depending on which country Bohuslän belonged to at the time, have resided at Holma. Some of these are the Friis, Bagge and Onstad families. The manor's coat of arms is from the Norwegian time and depicts a lindworm.

During the 16th century, Holma belonged to the Bagge family and in the 17th century it was owned by Rutger von Ascheberg and the Virgin family. In 1781, it was bought by wholesale merchant Bundsen who expanded the seat farm to its present size. During the 19th century, fishing in the fjord was a major source of income for the manor which had factories for salting herring and train oil made from boiled herring to extract the oil. The fishing also yielded atlantic salmon, oysters and lobsters. Equally large sources of income were farming and timber production. The manor also had a brännvin factory.

The current main building at the manor was built in 1911. It is predated by some barns and sheds that are still in use and a dilapidated mill by the now drained mill pond in the west part of the estate. During the early 20th century, Holma was one of the stations for steamboats trafficking the fjord. The steamboat quay is now part of a marina for small boats.

In 2013, a golf course was built at Holma. It is an 18-hole course maintained by Lysekil Holma GK. The golf club and its facilities are housed in the barns and sheds of the original seat farm.
