= Ohnstad =

Ohnstad is a surname. Notable people with the surname include:

- Mike Ohnstad (1926–2026), American politician in Minnesota
- Tod Ohnstad (born 1952), American labor union official, machinist, and politician

== See also ==
- Onstad
