= Stora Bornö =

Coordinates: 58.382385°N 11.583935°E

Stora Bornö is an island in Gullmarn fjord, belonging to the Lysekil Municipality.

Stora Bornö is about 4 km (2.5 mi) long from north to south and is largely covered with pine forests. The island's highest point is 110 m (360 ft) above sea level and in many places the shoreline consists of vertical cliffs.

Bornö Marine Research Station is an oceanographic research facility on the island, built in 1902 by Otto Pettersson and Gustaf Ekman.

The northwest part of Stora Bornö

== Bibliography ==
- Leppäranta, Matti; Myrberg, Kai (2009). Physical Oceanography of the Baltic Sea. Berlin, Germany: Springer Science & Business Media. ISBN 978-3-540-79703-6.
