= Grundsund =

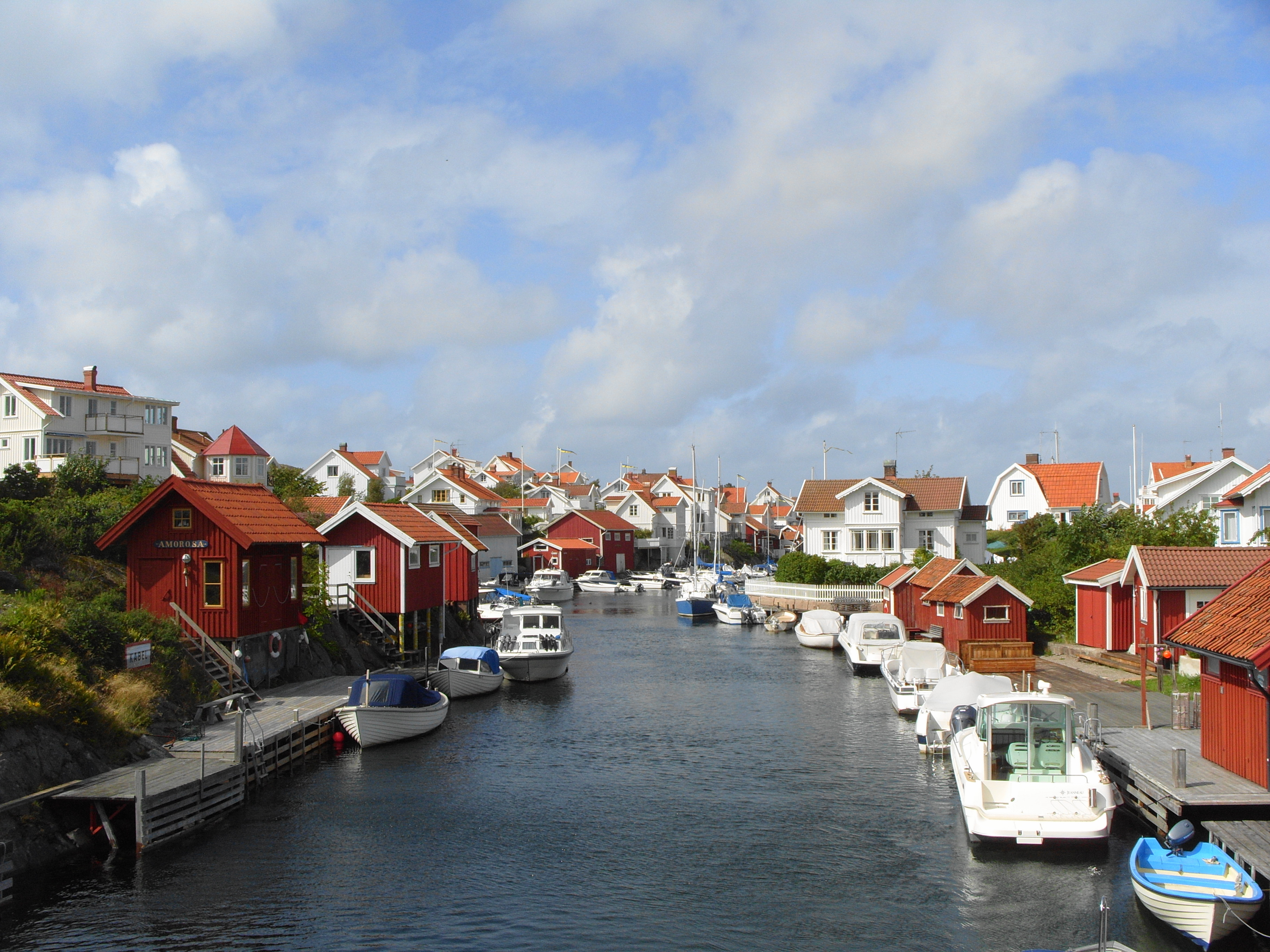

- Location within Västra Götaland Location within Sweden
- Coordinates: 58°13′N 11°25′E
- Country: Sweden
- Province: Bohuslän
- County: Västra Götaland County
- Municipality: Lysekil Municipality

Area
  - Total: 0.71 km^{2} (0.27 sq mi)

Population (31 December 2010)
  - Total: 627
  - Density: 885/km^{2} (2,290/sq mi)
- Time zone: UTC+1 (CET)
  - Summer (DST): UTC+2 (CEST)

Grundsund (Swedish pronunciation: [ˈɡrɵ̂nːdsɵnd]) is a locality situated in Lysekil Municipality, Västra Götaland County, Sweden. It had 627 inhabitants in 2010. It is located in the middle Bohusläns outer coastal strip, 25 km (16 mi) south of municipal seat of Lysekil and 40 km (25 mi) west of Uddevalla.

== History ==
The community is built partly on Skaftölandet and partly on Ösö. It is named after the shallow inlet, now known as Grundsund Canal that separates the two islands from each other. It has lineage back to at least the 17th century as a fishing village, but it wasn't until the great herring periods that settlement increased.

The good fishing led to blooming periods during the 19th century and made Grundsund into a big fishing village. It was never turned into a seaside resort or shipowner in the same way as Fiskebäckskil, instead the 20th century brought certain industry establishments, like raincoat production and canneries.

Many cutters were bought from England that were used for fishing mackerel at the beginning of the 20th century. A cannery located in Bovik produced canned goods with mackerel in tomato sauce.

Today the industry is gone and only two fishing boats remain.

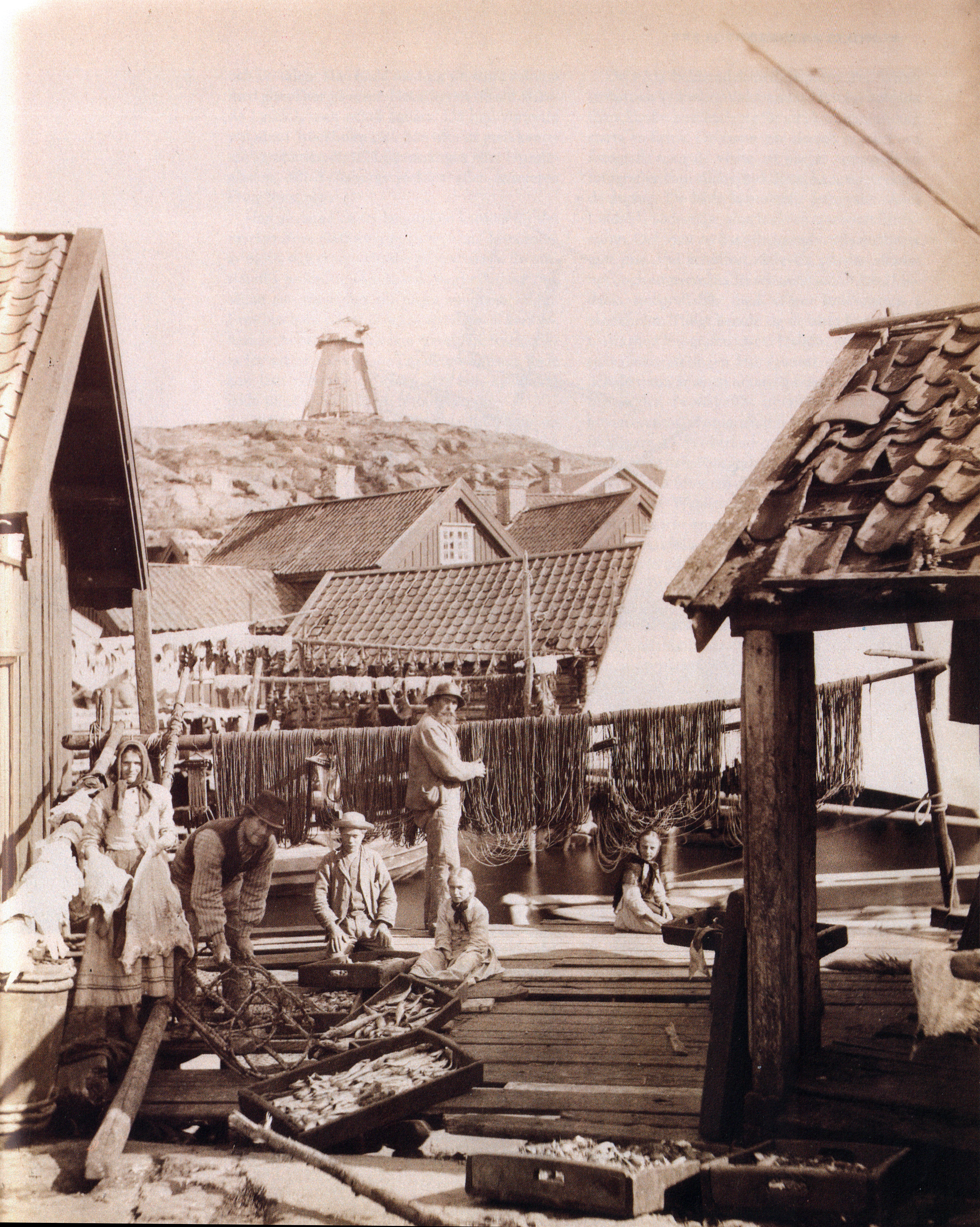
Grundsund circa 1890

== Grundsunds Church ==
The Grundsund fishing village had grown a lot during the 18th century's last half and more than 400 people lived there. Because the mother church was Morlanda church on Orust, and the travel around Islandsberg and over Ellös fjord could be a burden. There was a need for an own church.

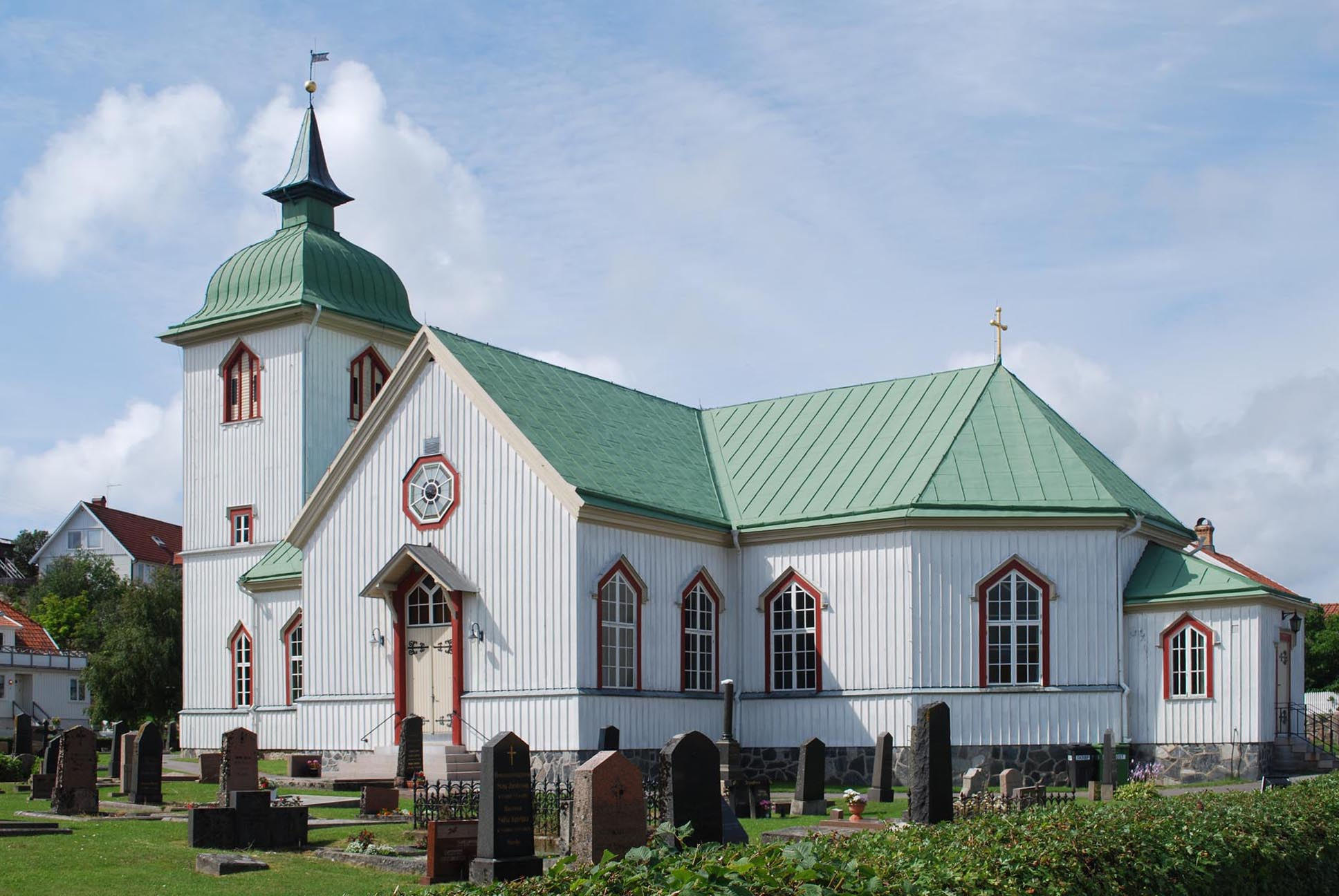
Grundsund Church

== Buildings ==
In the locality is Skaftö Folketshus (People's House). The new building was erected in 1988 with support from Boverket, after the old association compound from 1925 and 1952 was torn down.

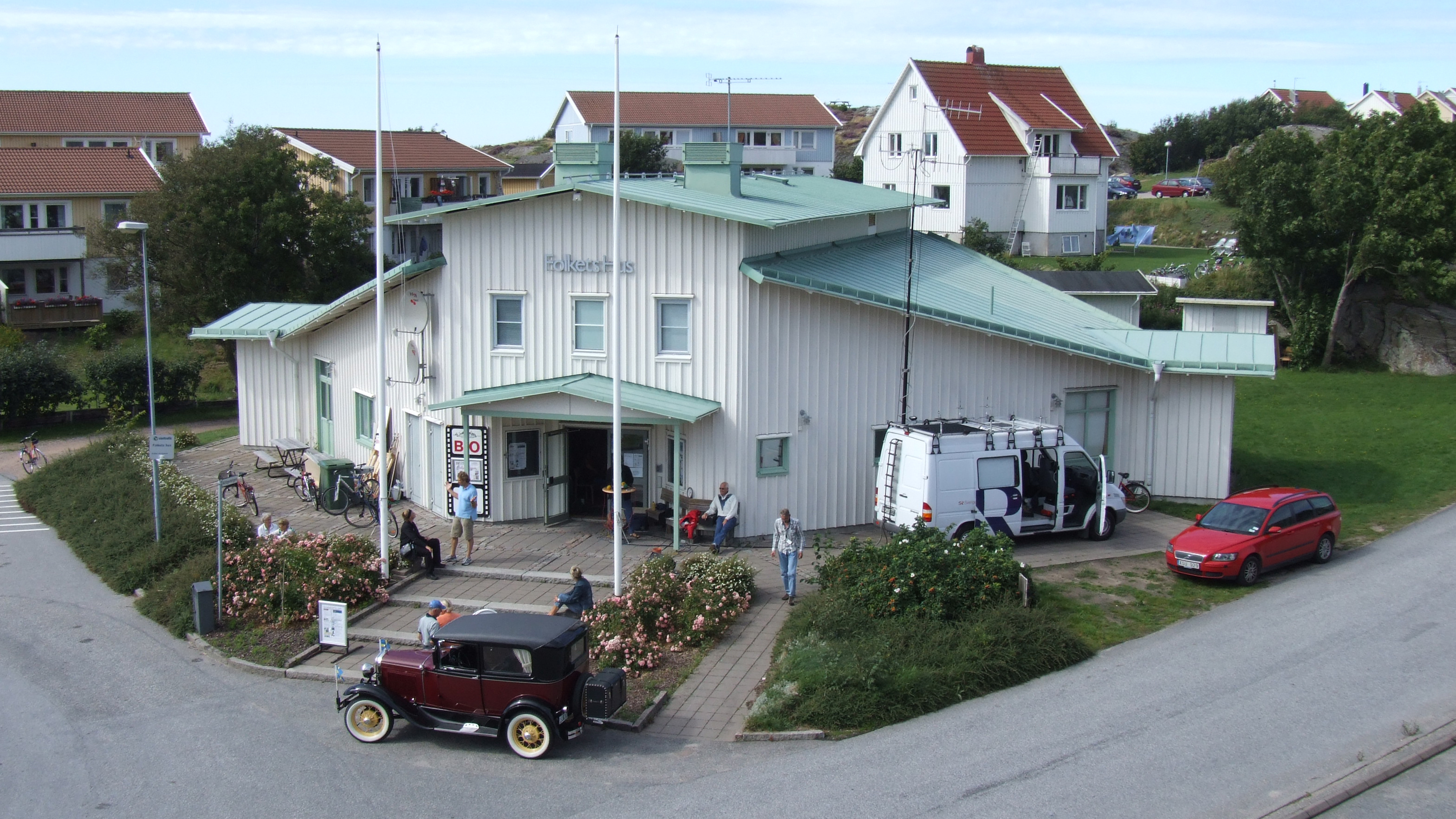
Skaftö Folketshus 2009

== Grundsund on TV ==
The TV series Saltön is mostly recorded in Grundsund. The first season aired in 2005, which attracted tourists to the area. A fourth season was confirmed in 2015 which began production that autumn and aired in 2016. Many locations can be recognized from the series, Pelles Rökeri for example was used a lot for the scenes taking place at the fictional restaurant "Lilla Hunden" (Little Dog).

TV4:s Crime Scene Sweden has depicted the so-called "suitcase murder" from 1969 with connections to Gåsö outside of Grundsund. The murder took place in Gothenburg and the body was "dumped" on Gåsö.
