= Tennessee Women's Hall of Fame =

The Tennessee Women's Hall of Fame is a non-profit, volunteer organization that recognizes women who have contributed to history of the U.S. state of Tennessee.

== History ==
The organization was founded and incorporated as a non-profit organization in 2010 to recognize accomplished women who have impacted the development of the state of Tennessee and improved the status of other women. It is the brainchild of the Women's Economic Council Foundation, Inc. and the Tennessee Economic Council on Women.

== Criteria ==
The criteria for induction into the Tennessee Women's Hall of Fame is that women were born in and achieved recognition within the state; are or have a resident in Tennessee for an extended period of time or adopted Tennessee as their home state. Additional criteria includes women who,:

- Have made significant, unique and permanent contributions to the economic, political and cultural betterment of Tennessee;
- Have elevated the status of women;
- Have promoted other women and women’s issues;
- Have been advocates for those issues which are important to women and families

== Inductees ==
The hall inducts new members annually or bi-annually and includes both contemporary and historical women or organizations which benefit women.

Tennessee Women's Hall of Fame
| Name | Image | Birth–Death | Year | Area of achievement |
|---|---|---|---|---|
| Joy Bishop | | (1934–2023) | 2015 | First career Air Force woman appointed to the Senior Executive Service and served as the Women's Program Coordinator. |
| Lizzie Crozier French | | (1851–1926) | 2015 | Founder of the Knoxville Female Institute and the Tennessee Suffrage Association |
| Elizabeth Rona | | (1890–1981) | 2015 | First woman to teach chemistry in any university in Hungary, in the United States, she served on the Manhattan Project |
| Janice M. Holder | | (1949–) | 2015 | First woman Chief Justice of Tennessee |
| Rosetta Miller-Perry | | (1934–) | 2015 | Founder of the Greater Nashville Black Chamber of Commerce, and co-founder, publisher and journalist of Perry & Perry Publishing Company |
| Margaret Rhea Seddon | | (1947–) | 2015 | One of the inaugural group of women astronauts of NASA |
| Zulfat Suara | | | 2015 | Chair and founder of the American Muslim Council of Tennessee |
| Carol Gardner Transou | | (1936–2021) | 2015 | 1987 Tennessee Teacher of the Year and first Tennessee Teacher-Scholar of the National Endowment for the Humanities |
| Margaret L. Behm | | (c. 1951–) | 2013 | Co-founded Shipley & Behm, the first all-woman law firm in Nashville |
| Wilsie S. Bishop | | (1949–) | 2013 | First woman Chief Operating Officer and Vice President of East Tennessee State University |
| M. Inez Crutchfield | | (1925–2024) | 2013 | First African American to hold an appointed and elected statewide position in the Tennessee State Federation of Democratic Women |
| Shirley C. Raines | | (1945–) | 2013 | President of the University of Memphis |
| Becca Stevens | | (1963–) | 2013 | Founder of Magdalene House |
| Jocelyn Wurzburg | | (1940–) | 2013 | Orchestrated an interfaith and inter-racial group response to the assassination of Martin Luther King, Jr. |
| Pat Summitt | | (1952–2016) | 2011 | Most all-time wins for a coach in NCAA basketball history of either a men's or women's team in any division |
| Martha Craig Daughtrey | | (1942–) | 2010 | First Tennessee woman to be appointed to the United States Court of Appeals for the Sixth Circuit |
| Jane G. Eskind | | (1933–2016) | 2010 | First woman to win a statewide election in Tennessee |
