= Zulfat Suara =

Nigerian-American activist, businesswoman and politician

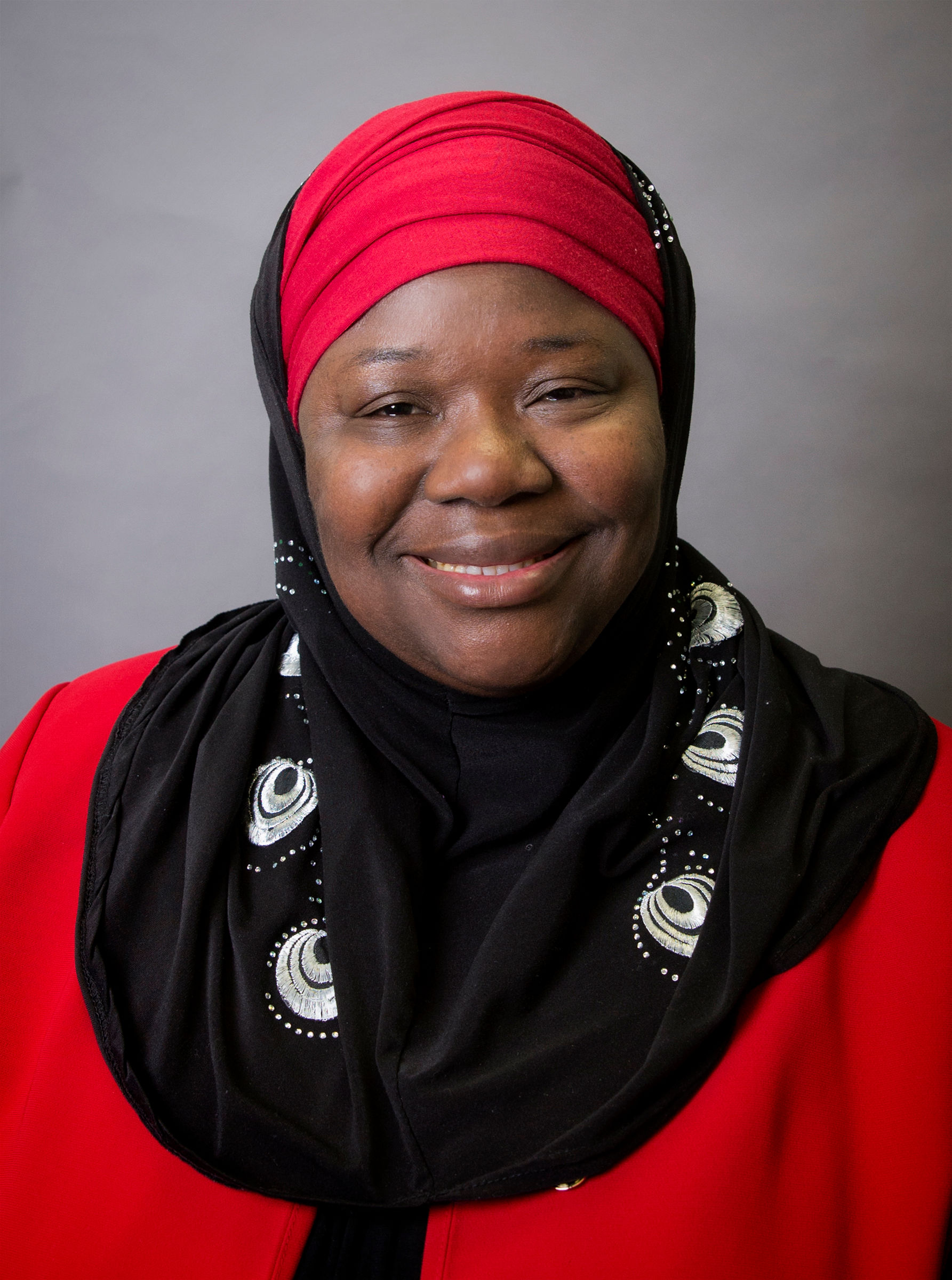

First Chair, Councilwoman At-Large, Metropolitan Council of Nashville and Davidson County

Council president pro-tempore
- Incumbent
- Assumed office September 2023

Councilwoman At-Large, Metropolitan Council of Nashville and Davidson County
- In office September 2019 – September 2023

Personal details
- Born: Ibadan, Nigeria
- Party: Democratic
- Spouse: Dr. Rahaman Suara
- Children: 5
- Education: The Polytechnic, Ibadan
- Profession: Certified Public Accountant
- Website: zulfatsuara.com

Zulfat Suara, is a Nigerian-American activist, businesswoman, and politician. In September 2019, she became the first Muslim to be elected to the Metropolitan Government of Nashville and Davidson County and the first immigrant elected to an at-large position. She is also the first Muslim woman elected in the State of Tennessee and the first Nigerian-born woman elected to any political office in the United States.

== Early life, education, and career ==
Suara is originally from Ibadan, Nigeria. She was a head prefect of her high school and was Amira for the college and state chapters of the Muslim Students Society of Nigeria. She graduated with a Higher National Diploma in Accountancy with High Honors (Upper Credit) from The Polytechnic, Ibadan. She came to the U.S. in 1993 when her husband was offered a fellowship at Vanderbilt University.

After moving to Tennessee, she earned her District of Columbia Certified Public Accountant (CPA) certificate in 1996 and her Tennessee State CPA License in 1999. For two years, she worked full-time as a CPA for KPMG in Nashville. Suara later founded her own accounting firm that worked with several county governments across the West Tennessee region. She was also the Assistant Vice President - Grants Accounting Management, until October 2024, at Meharry Medical College.

== Community involvement ==
Between 2009 and 2011, Suara served two terms as the State President of Business and Professional Women's Foundation (BPW). From this role, she became the Tennessee Women's Day on the Hill Chair for seven years, leading an annual event that allows women's advocacy organizations to present directly to politicians in Tennessee. Suara is also a board member of the Women's Fund of the Community Foundation of Middle TN, a 2020 board member of Women Business Collaborative, and an annual speaker at the Tennessee Women's March. In 2015, she was inducted into the Tennessee Women's Hall of Fame.

In 2004, Suara started the Hardeman County, Tennessee Chapter of Junior Achievement to improve educational opportunities and outcomes in rural Tennessee. As a result, she won the FBI Director Community Leadership Award in January 2016. She serves as a board member of the PENCIL foundation in Nashville, TN. She is a recipient of the National Education Association's Mary Hatwood Futrell Human Rights Award (2020).

Suara is also involved in the American Muslim Advisory Council (AMAC), an organization that was created as a response to the “anti-Shariah” bill in 2012. Beyond acting as a founder of the organization, she was Chair between 2012–2016 and 2018–2019, and in 2021 she was AMAC's treasurer. In 2018, the Islamic Society of North America recognized her as the ISNA Muslim Advocate of the year.

== Political career ==
Suara first ran for office in 2014 as a candidate for the Hardeman County School Board. Her campaign designated her as the first Muslim woman to run for any office in the state of Tennessee. She ended the election with 41% of the vote against the chairman of the board.

=== Nashville Metro Council Member At-Large (2019-2023) ===
In 2019, she launched her second campaign as a candidate for Nashville Metro Council. Promoting a “Nashville for All”, she pushed for the implementation of more fiscally responsible government practices, community-based budgeting, and improved access to quality education for the city's youth.

During her campaign, Suara faced pushback due to her religion, even receiving death threats. With over 34 thousand votes, she won the Metro Council seat and became the first Muslim woman elected in the State of Tennessee and the first Nigerian woman elected to any office in the United States.

In office, Suara has served as chair of the Affordable Housing Committee, Vice-chair of the Education Committee, and Member of the Budget/Finance, Audit, and Personnel/Public Relations committees.

Following the death of Representative John Robert Lewis, Suara led an effort to honor the late congressman and highlight Nashville's role in the civil rights movement. Working with the minority caucus and other community leaders, she sponsored a city ordinance in November 2020 to rename Fifth Avenue from Jefferson Street to I-40 to Rep. John Lewis Way. The new name was officially adopted on the first anniversary of Rep. Lewis’ death.

=== Re-election, First Chair and Metro Council Pro-Tempore (2023-2027) ===
On August 3, 2023, Zulfat won her re-election bid. Among 20 candidates, she was the only one to win outright, avoiding a run-off. This victory also made her the first person of color, male or female, in the Metro's 60-year history to win the chamber's 1st chair (the individual with the most votes in the 40-member council). She was subsequently selected by her fellow council members as Metro Council Pro-Tempore as well.

During her second term, she served as the Chair of the Diane Nash Committee, organizing a commemorative event to celebrate the important Civil Rights Movement activist and renaming the Metro Courthouse Plaza in her honor.

In July 2024, multiple demonstrations led by a Neo-Nazi hate group were done throughout the city of Nashville, most notably during a Metro Council announcement meeting presided over by Suara. The group harassed media and council members with anti-semitic, homophobic, and racist statements and gestures. Suara addressed the incidents directly in the chamber: “They want attention; you don’t have to give it to them. But I do want you to know that this Council and Nashville government condemns all forms of hate. When you come for one of us, you come for all of us, and we continue to stand together as Nashvillians." Suara then cleared the gallery, removing the hate group from the Chamber. She was lauded by her peers and the public for her bravery and judgment. The event sparked Nashville's participation in the national "United Against Hate" campaign.

=== State and national politics ===
Suara serves as Treasurer of the National Women's Political Caucus (NWPC). Prior to this role, she served as President-Elect of the Tennessee Women's Political Caucus. She also served as the Treasurer and Vice President of Political Planning for the organization at the state level.

In 2020, Suara was a member of the DNC Platform Committee, where she submitted an amendment regarding the treatment of international students that became part of the party's national platform. She also served as the Tennessee State co-chair of Bernie Sanders’ Presidential Campaign in 2020.

=== Testifying before the US House Sub-Committee ===
On March 1, 2022, Zulfat, along with other community leaders testified before the House Subcommittee on the Constitution, Civil Rights, and Civil Liberties on the Discrimination and the Civil Rights of the Muslim, Arab, and South Asian American Communities. Zulfat's written and oral testimonies highlighted the many incidents of discrimination in the Muslim community at the local, state, and federal levels.

== Electoral history ==
Nashville Metro Council, At-Large, General Election, 2023
	Candidate	Votes	%
✔	Zulfat Suara	10.7%	40,575
	Delishia Porterfield	9.1%	34,481
	Burkley Allen	8.0%	30,314
	Olivia Hill	6.8%	25,802
	Howard Jones	6.7%	25,327
	Quin Evans-Segall	5.9%	22,644
	Russ Pulley	5.9%	22,386
	Chris Cheng	5.8%	22,000
	Jeff Syracuse	5.4%	20,643
	Marcia Masulla	5.3%	20,275
	Yolanda Hockett	5.2%	19,799
	Arnold Hayes	4.3%	16,288
	Chris Crofton	3.4%	12,936
	Ronnie Greer Sr.	3.0%	11,349
	Tony Chapman	2.7%	10,290
	Stephen Downs	2.6%	9,998
	Deloris Vandivort	2.4%	9,005
	Gilbert Ramirez	2.1%	7,924
	Indrani Ray	1.6%	6,257
	Jonathan Williamson	1.5%	5,797
	Brian Hellwig	1.3%	5,115
	Other/Write-in	0.4%	1,447

Nashville Metro Council At-Large, General Election, 2019
	Candidate	Votes	%
✔	Bob Mendes	37,476	10.9%
	Zulfat Suara	31,953	9.3%
	Sharon Hurt	31,731	9.2%
	Sheri Weiner	31,672	9.2%
	Burkley Allen	30,722	8.9%
	Fabian Bedne	25,001	7.3%
	Howard Jones	24,828	7.2%
	Steve Glover	23,929	7.0%
	Gary Moore	20,843	6.1%
	Gicola Lane	20,243	5.9%
	Adam Dread	19,741	5.7%
	Michael Craddock	16,130	4.7%
	James Dillard	14,085	4.1%
	Matthew DelRossi	8,116	2.4%
	Rueben Dockery	5,425	1.6%
	Other/Write-In	1,618	0.5%

Nashville Metro Council At-Large, General Election Runoff, 2019
	Candidate	Votes	%
✔	Sharon Hurt	15.3%	40,332
✔	Burkley Allen	13.2%	34,754
✔	Steve Glover	13.1%	34,408
✔	Zulfat Suara	13.0%	34,271
	Sheri Weiner	12.6%	33,108
	Howard Jones	11.5%	30,201
	Fabian Bedne	11.3%	29,840
	Gary Moore	9.6%	25,264
	Other/Write-in	0.5%	1,414

== Personal life ==
Zulfat Suara married Dr. Rahaman Suara in 1990. They emigrated from Nigeria in 1993 and live with their five children in Nashville, TN.
