= Sven Otto Pettersson =

Swedish oceanographer (1848–1941)

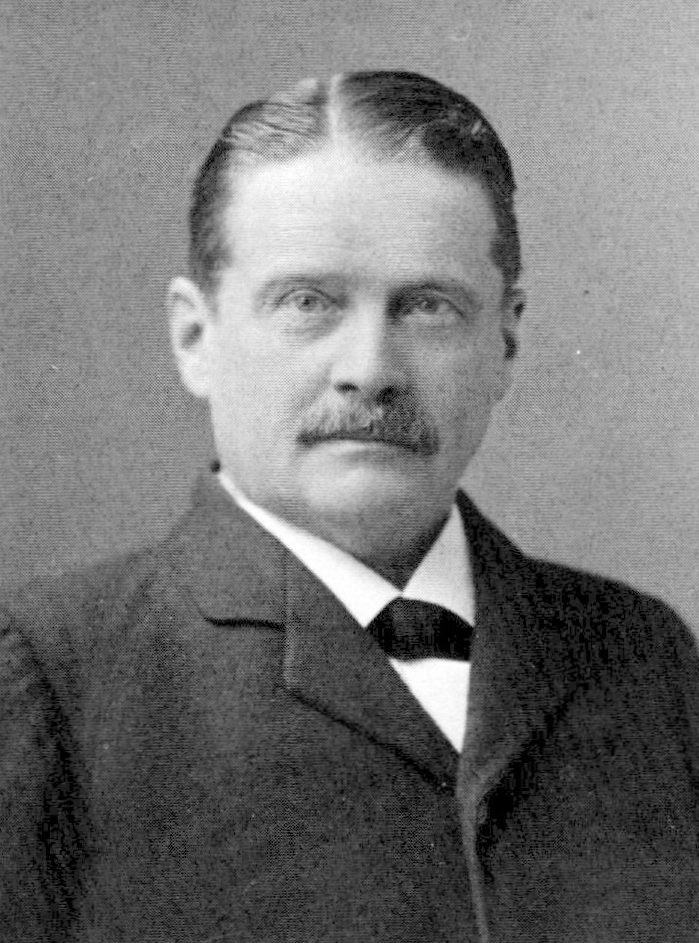

Sven Otto Pettersson (12 February 1848 – 16 January 1941) was a Swedish oceanographer and chemist. He was a founding member of the Swedish hydrographic commission. His main contribution to chemistry was the determination of the valency of beryllium along with Lars F. Nilsson in 1878. He also pioneered studies on fisheries and sea conditions and was involved in founding and organizing the International Council for the Exploration of the Sea.

== Life and work ==
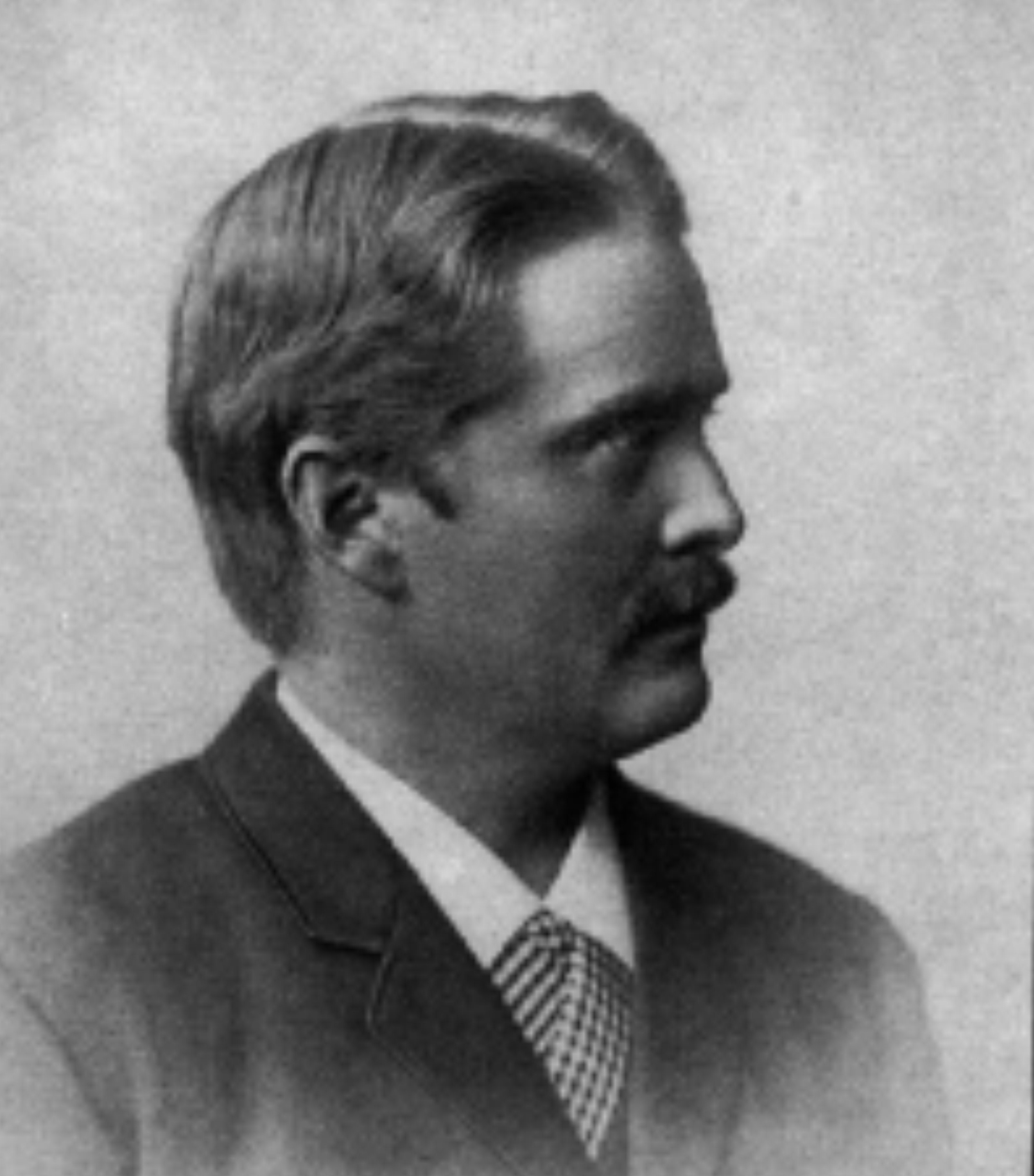
In 1900

Pettersson was born in Gothenburg, the son of merchant Johan Fredrik and Emelie Leontine Borgman from the Bohuslän county. The family had been involved in successful herring fisheries for generations. Pettersson studied chemistry at the University of Uppsala from 1866 and received a doctorate on selenium alums. In 1872 he worked in the laboratory of Carl Remigus Fresenius in Wiesbaden on analytical chemistry. He returned in 1874 to become an assistant professor at the University of Uppsala. In 1875 he married Agnes, daughter of major general Nils C. Irgens. He found chemistry too boring and old-fashioned and moved to Stockholm to teach at the Høgskola where he became chair of chemistry in 1884. He studied the chemistry of sea water in 1878 and also examined the physics of ice in the sea. He began to examine the correlation of herring appearance and sea salinity. After his friend from Uppsala, Gustaf Ekman, noticed a particular sea temperature used by herring, the two began to make systematic observations of temperature and salinity in the straits of Kattegat and Skagerrak. A distant relative of Ekman was the hydrographer Fredrik Laurentz Ekman and his incomplete and unpublished work was taken up by Pettersson. His students included Vilhelm Bjerknes and Svante Arrhenius. From 1900 he served on the Nobel prize committee in chemistry. He retired in 1909 to Bohuslän and lived on the Gullmarn Fjord. In 1892 he moved to Holma Manor near Lysekil where they ran a farm. He set up a private research station on the island of Bornö in 1902 to conduct oceanography research.

Pettersson was a founding member of the Swedish Hydrographic Commission and later the Svenska Hydrografisk-Biologiska Kommission in 1901. The commission sought to study the seas, the chemistry, the topography and fish biology. He brought the explorer Fridtjof Nansen, zoologist Johan Hjort, oceanographers Bjørn Helland-Hansen, Haaken Hasberg Gran and others to collaborate together and was involved in the creation of the International Council for the Exploration of the Sea and served on its board from its founding in 1902. During World War I, he presided over it as he was from Sweden which was neutral, serving from 1915 to 1920. Pettersson invented instruments to measure conductivity and temperature at specific depths.

Pettersson's youngest son Hans became a professor of oceanography.
