= Fiskebäckskil =

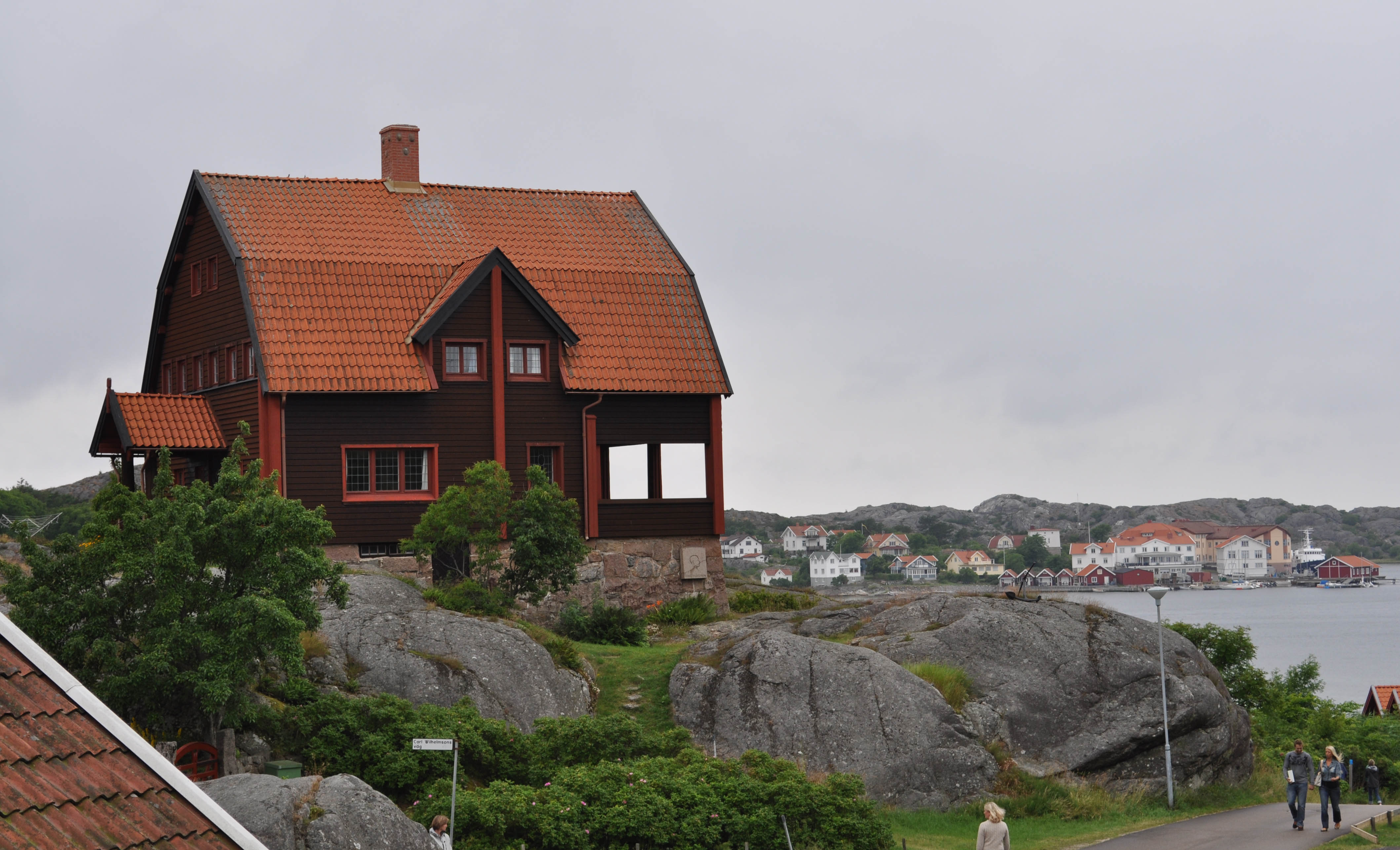
- Carl Wilhelmson's studio

- Location within Västra Götaland Location within Sweden
- Coordinates: 58°14′50″N 11°27′30″E
- Country: Sweden
- Province: Bohuslän
- County: Västra Götaland County
- Municipality: Lysekil Municipality

Area
  - Total: 0.72 km^{2} (0.28 sq mi)

Population (31 December 2010)
  - Total: 379
  - Density: 527/km^{2} (1,360/sq mi)
- Time zone: UTC+1 (CET)
  - Summer (DST): UTC+2 (CEST)

Fiskebäckskil is a locality in Lysekil Municipality, Västra Götaland County, Sweden, at the mouth of the Gullmarn fjord. It had 379 inhabitants in 2010. Once primarily a fishing community, it transformed into a shipping community in the 19th century and currently is a thriving tourist resort.

== Notable residents ==
- Elise Hwasser (1831-1894), stage actress
- Johan Hjalmar Théel (1848-1937) Marine zoologist, director of local zoological station 1892–1908
- Frida Kinhult (1999-) professional golfer
- Marcus Kinhult (1996-) professional golfer, winner on the European Tour
- Michael Thorndyke (1946–) British marine biologist
- Carl Wilhelmson (1866–1928) Artist and professor

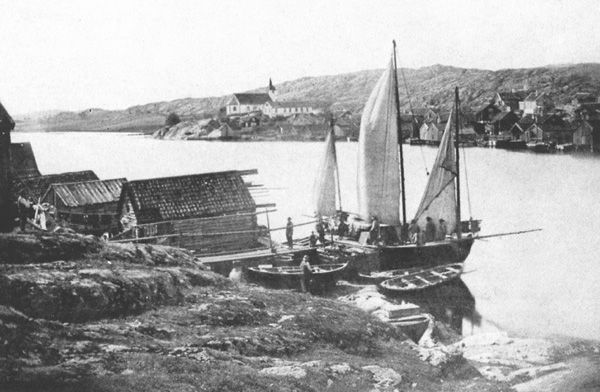
Fiskebäckskil around 1900
