= Rosetta Miller-Perry =

American journalist and publisher (1934–2026)

Rosetta Miller-Perry

Rosetta Miller-Perry (July 7, 1934 – June 26, 2026) was an American journalist and founder of the Tennessee Tribune.

== Early life and education ==
Rosetta Miller-Perry was born in Coraopolis, Pennsylvania on July 7, 1934. She received her early education from McKinley Elementary School and Coraopolis Junior High School. Later, she attended Howard University and Herzl Community College for further education.

She held a BS degree in chemistry from the University of Memphis.

== Career ==
Miller-Perry started her career by joining the United States Navy in 1954.

In 1990, she founded Perry and Perry Associates and started publishing a magazine called Contempora. A year later, she founded the Tennessee Tribune, an African-American newspaper. She was also the founder of Greater Nashville Black Chamber of Commerce.

In 2019, she received the National Newspaper Publishers Association award.

The Rosetta I. Miller Scholarship given by the Memphis State University and Rosetta Miller-Perry Award for Best Film by a Black Filmmaker awarded at the Nashville Film Festival are named after her.

== Death ==
Miller died on June 26, 2026, at the age of 91.

== Recognition ==
- Tennessee Women's Hall of Fame
- National Newspaper Publishers Association Award
