= Becca Stevens (priest) =

American chaplain

The Rev. Becca Stevens is an author, speaker, Episcopal priest, social entrepreneur, founder and president of Thistle Farms in Nashville, Tennessee. She is notable for founding Magdalene in 1997, now called Thistle Farms, to heal, empower, and employ female survivors of human trafficking, prostitution, and addiction. She was the 2000 Nashvillian of the Year and in 2013 was inducted into the Tennessee Women's Hall of Fame.

== Biography ==
Becca Stevens was born on April 1, 1963, in Connecticut to Anne and the Rev. Gladston Hudson Stevens, Jr. When she was four years old, her family relocated to Nashville, Tennessee, and a year later, her father was killed in a car accident by a drunk driver. After completing her secondary education at John Overton High School, Stevens enrolled in her father's alma mater, The University of the South in Sewanee, Tennessee, studying math. When she graduated, she completed an internship at Bread for the World and led the Kanuga Conference Center's youth program near Hendersonville, North Carolina, before returning to Nashville in 1987. Stevens enrolled in Vanderbilt Divinity School, where she met her future husband Marcus Hummon, whom she married in 1988. During her schooling, she volunteered in projects to help homeless women and those dealing with addiction.

Stevens was ordained in June 1991 and gave birth to her first child the following month. After her ordination, Stevens began working at the Church of the Resurrection in Franklin, Tennessee, continuing her work with those in need. When in 1995, the chaplain of St. Augustine’s Chapel at Vanderbilt retired, Stevens accepted the post. She founded Magdalene in 1997, a two-year residential program for former prostitutes overcoming addiction and wanting to restart their lives. In 2001, she started Thistle Farms, which employs the same group of women to make home and body products sold in stores like Whole Foods and on thistlefarms.org. In 2013, Thistle Farms opened a café, employing survivors of prostitution, trafficking, and addiction as baristas.

She has written several books, including nine published by Abingdon Press. Her 2013 memoir, Snake Oil: The Art of Healing and Truth-Telling, "details her own sexual abuse and healing and how her ministry has led to the founding of Thistle Farms," and was reported by The Tennessean as an area bestseller. She has received many local awards as well as being designated a White House Champion of Change in 2011. In 2016, Becca was named a CNN Top Hero of the Year for her work with Thistle Farms and Magdalene.

== Books ==
- Finding Balance: Loving God with Heart and Soul, Mind and Strength. Abingdon Press. 2004. ISBN 978-0-687-34510-6.
- Sanctuary: Unexpected Places Where God Found Me. Abingdon Press. 2005. ISBN 978-0-687-49420-0.
- Hither and Yon: A Travel Guide for the Spiritual Journey. Abingdon Press. 2007. ISBN 978-0-687-49076-9.
- Walking Bible Study: The Path of Peace. Abingdon Press. 2010. ISBN 978-1-4267-3329-1.
- Walking Bible Study: The Path of Love. Abingdon Press. 2010. ISBN 978-1-4267-1174-9.
- Walking Bible Study: The Path of Justice. Abingdon Press. 2010. ISBN 978-1-4267-4608-6.
- Funeral for a Stranger: Thoughts on Life and Love. Abingdon Press. 2010. ISBN 978-1-4267-2234-9.
- Find Your Way Home: Words from the Street, Wisdom from the Heart. Abingdon Press. 2010. ISBN 978-1-4267-2253-0. Co-written with the Women of Magdalene.
- The Gift of Compassion: A Guide to Helping Those Who Grieve. Abingdon Press. 2012. ISBN 978-1-4267-4234-7.
- Snake Oil: The Art of Healing and Truth-Telling. FaithWords. 2013. ISBN 978-1-4555-1907-1.
- The Way of Tea and Justice: Rescuing the World's Favorite Beverage from Its Violent History. FaithWords. 2014. ISBN 978-1-4555-1903-3.
- Love Heals. HarperCollins/Thomas Nelson. 2017. ISBN 978-0-7180-7563-7.

== Awards ==
- The Frist Foundation and the Academy of Women in Achievement
- Nashvillian of the Year by the Nashville Scene, 2000
- A Tennessean of the Year by The Tennessean, 2005
- "NEXT Award" as an Entrepreneur of the Year by the Nashville Area Chamber of Commerce, 2011
- A White House "Champion of Change", 2011
- Top 10 CNN Hero of the Year, 2016

== Personal life ==
She is married to Grammy-winning country music artist Marcus Hummon, and has three children.
