= Rixö =

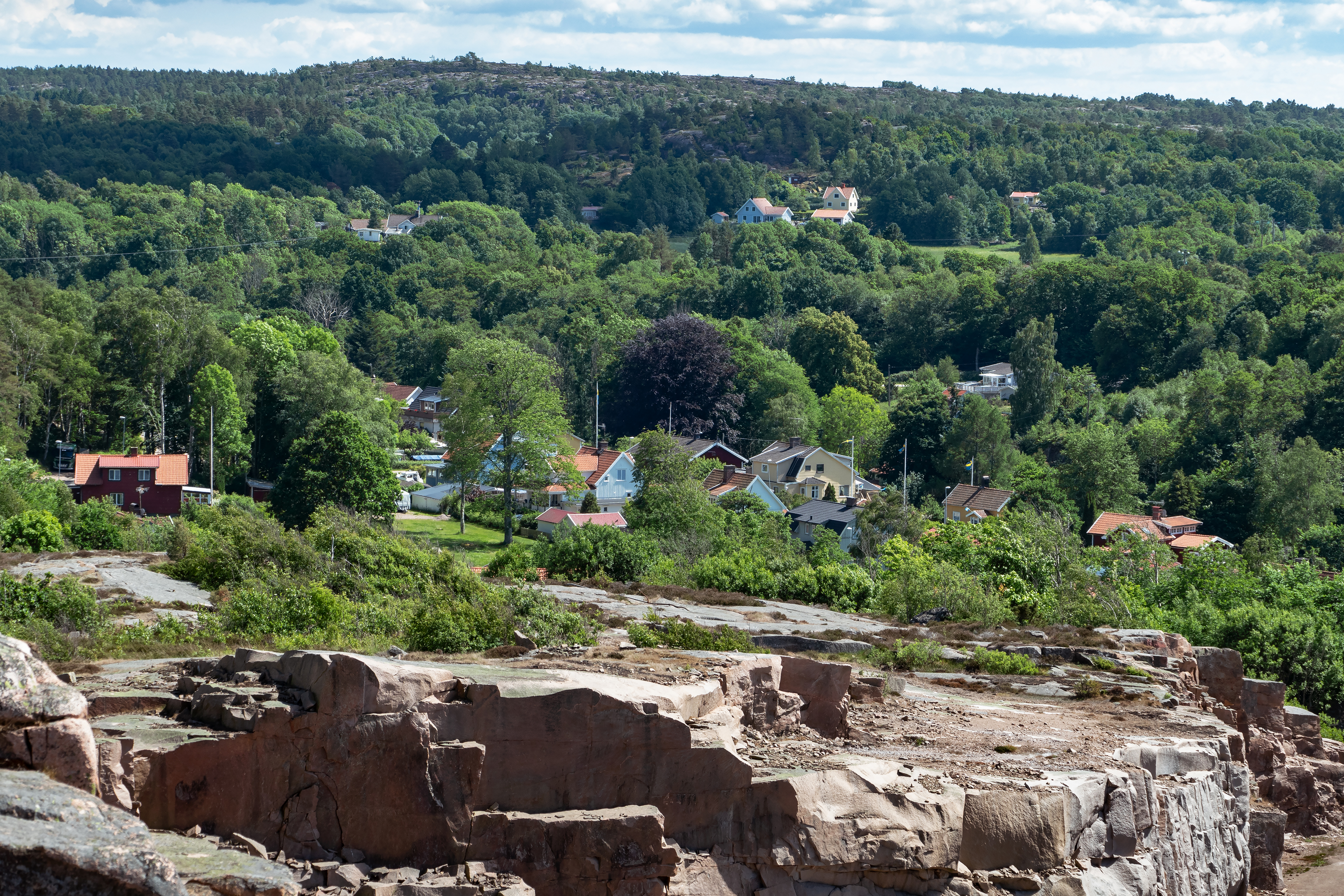
- Rixö village with part of the granite quarry

- Location within Västra Götaland Location within Sweden
- Coordinates: 58°23′N 11°29′E
- Country: Sweden
- Province: Bohuslän
- County: Västra Götaland County
- Municipality: Lysekil Municipality

Area
  - Total: 1.24 km^{2} (0.48 sq mi)

Population (31 December 2010)
  - Total: 357
  - Density: 289/km^{2} (750/sq mi)
- Time zone: UTC+1 (CET)
  - Summer (DST): UTC+2 (CEST)

Rixö is a locality situated in Lysekil Municipality, Västra Götaland County, Sweden. It had 357 inhabitants in 2010.

== History ==
The settlement grew up around the granite quarry and stonemasonry industry in the shore of Brofjorden. The industry was started on a German initiative and was run by Skandinaviska Granit AB in 1875–1964. Most of the stone was exported to Germany for the building of Autobahn; some went to Argentina and to various constructions in Sweden. As of 2018, only a small part of the quarry is in operation.

== Geography ==
In Brofjorden, opposite Rixö is Ryxö island, a designated nature reserve.
