= Tennessee Tribune =

American newspaper in Nashville, Tennessee

The Tennessee Tribune
- Type: Weekly newspaper
- Launched: 1992
- City: Nashville
- ISSN: 1067-5280
- OCLC number: 27259983
- Website: tntribune.com

The Tennessee Tribune is an African-American newspaper in Nashville, Tennessee. It is the only statewide African-American newspaper in the United States, and its circulation is statewide. It is circulated in Nashville, Chattanooga, Knoxville and Memphis. It was founded in 1991 by Rosetta Irvin Miller-Perry.

Miller-Perry received the Lifetime Achievement Award from the National Newspaper Publishers Association in 2019.
