= Kålhuvudet =

Nature reserve in Västernorrland, Sweden

Coordinates: 63.6308°N 18.4550°E

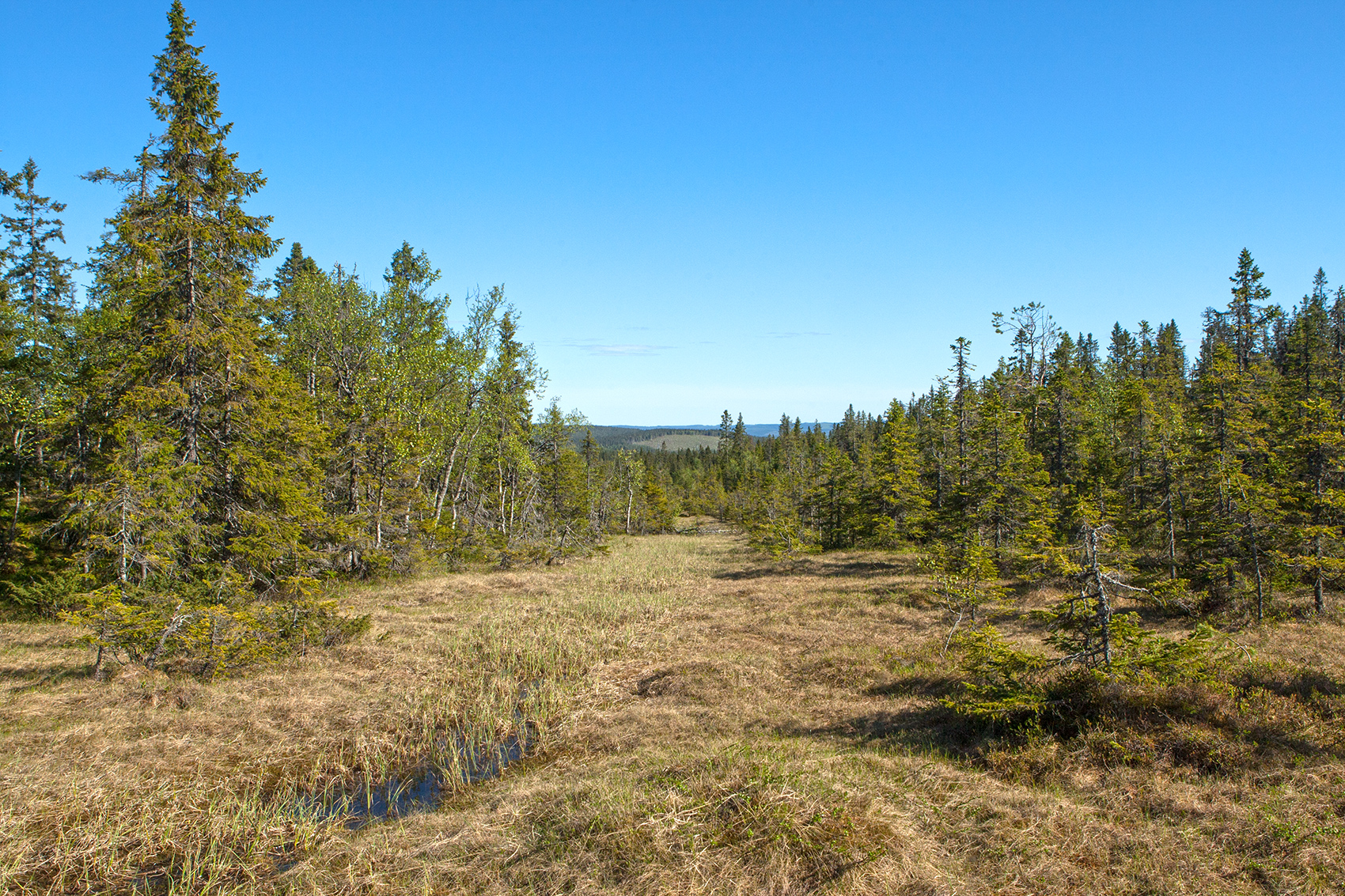
Kålhuvudet

Kålhuvudet or the Kålhuvudets Nature Reserve is situated in Örnsköldsvik Municipality, in Björna parish of Västernorrland County in northern Sweden. It is located 7 km southwest of Hemling and covers 770 hectares.

The reserve was founded in 1993 and is a protected old-growth spruce forest interspersed with sloped wetland areas more typical to mountainous regions. Located at 510 meters above sea level, the area is subject to high levels of snowfall and many of the trees have experienced damage from the snows. The area was protected to allow the ecosystem to freely develop.

Several varieties of spiders, including the conical wheel orb-weaver spider and the long-jawed orb weaver spider have been found amid the spruce trees. The Black woodpecker, Eurasian three-toed woodpecker, Siberian jay and western capercaillie are among the various bird species found in the forest.

Among the types of flora found are shrub-like birch; flowering Cicerbita alpina and Listera cordata; various lichens; and the rare or endangered mosses Anastrophyllum hellerianum, Lophozia longidens and Calypogeia suecica. There are also numerous types of fungi which are characteristically found in decaying spruce forests, such as Amylocystis lapponicus, Fomitopsis rosea, Laurilia sulcata, Phellinidium ferrugineofuscum, Phellopilus nigrolimitatus, Phlebia mellea and Skeletocutis odora.

There is one small cabin with two bunk beds in the reserve. It has a heating unit and a drinking spring lies approximately 100 meters south of the cabin.
