= Onstad =

Onstad is a Norwegian surname. Notable people with the surname include:

- Chris Onstad (born 1975), American writer, cartoonist, and artist
- Erik Gjems-Onstad (1922–2011), Norwegian resistance member, lawyer, and politician
- Kari Onstad (1941–2020), Norwegian singer and actress
- Katrina Onstad, Canadian journalist and novelist
- Kenton Onstad (born 1953), American politician, member of the North Dakota House of Representatives
- Kristian Flittie Onstad (born 1984), Norwegian professional football defender
- Mike Ohnstad (1926–2026), American politician in Minnesota
- Niels Onstad (1909–1978), Norwegian shipping executive
- Oda Utsi Onstad (born 1990), Norwegian long and triple jumper
- Ole Gjems-Onstad (born 1950), Norwegian jurist
- Otto Onstad (1874–1961), American politician
- Pat Onstad (born 1968), Canadian professional soccer goalkeeper

== See also ==
- Onstad Township, Polk County, Minnesota, United States
- Henie Onstad Kunstsenter, art museum in Oslo, Norway
