= Magdalene program =

Recovery program in Nashville, Tennessee

Magdalene is a recovery program in Nashville, Tennessee for women who have histories of substance abuse and prostitution. It was founded in 1996 by Becca Stevens, an Episcopal priest and the current chaplain of Saint Augustine's Chapel at Vanderbilt University. The women participating in the program live communally in several residences in Nashville.

== System of Recovery ==
The system of recovery practiced at Magdalene is based on the twelve steps and twelve traditions of Narcotics Anonymous. In addition to NA and counseling, the Magdalene program offers job and financial skills training to the women so that they may live productive lives free of criminal activity. An individual typically leaves the program after two years.

== Affiliation with Thistle Farms ==
The Magdalene program requires that its participants find work after six months in recovery. Many find this employment with Thistle Farms, an affiliated business started in 2001 that helps to fund the program.
