= Ruth Howes =

American nuclear physicist (1944–2025)

- Born: Ruth Howes; October 18, 1944; Montpelier, Vermont
- Died: April 29, 2025 (aged 80); Sante Fe, New Mexico
- Education: Columbia University, Mount Holyoke
- Spouse: Robert I Howes Jr
- Scientific career
- Fields: Nuclear Physics
- Workplaces: Ball State University, Marquette University
- Thesis: Measurements of quadrupole-moment ratios of the first excited 2+ states of 176, 178, and 180Hf using the Mössbauer effect following Coulomb excitation (1971)
- Doctoral advisor: Chien-Shiung Wu

Ruth Hege Howes (October 18, 1944 – April 29, 2025) was an American nuclear physicist, expert on nuclear weapons, and historian of science, known for her books on women in physics. Throughout her career, she also contributed greatly to advancing undergraduate physics education. As co-author of several books that put a spotlight on the careers of female scientists, including those involved in the Manhattan Project, she considerably increased female scientists' recognition.

== Early life and education ==
Ruth Hege was born October 18, 1944 in Montpelier, Vermont, to James Landes and Marvin (Colton) Hege. In 1962, she graduated from Northfield Mount Hermon boarding school in Gill, Massachusetts. She earned her bachelor's degree from Mount Holyoke College in 1965, later revealing that she "studied physics in college because it was the most beautiful intellectual endeavor [she] ever encountered." After college, she earned her MA from Columbia University in 1967 and her PhD in physics from Columbia University in 1971. Hege conducted her doctoral research under physicist Chien-Shiung Wu, focusing largely on the Mossbauer Effect. In 1971, her thesis, "Measurements of Quadrupole-Moment Ratios of the First Excited 2^{+} states of ^{176, 178, and 180}Hf using the Mössbauer Effect Following Coulomb Excitation," was published.

== Research and career ==
Howes began her career in academia as a visiting assistant physics professor at the University of Oklahoma from 1971 to 1972. She then served as an adjunct instructor at Oklahoma City University from 1972 to 1976. In 1976, she joined the faculty at Ball State University, becoming the university’s first female physics professor. She was later named the George and Frances Ball Distinguished Professor of Physics and Astronomy in 1991.

Howes was an advocate of the importance of science in directing national security policy. In 1984, on a sabbatical from Ball State University, she was selected as a William C. Foster Fellow at the US Arms Control and Disarmament Agency. From 1987 to 1992, Howes served as director of the Center for Global Security Studies at Ball State University. She published a guest editorial on nuclear physics in the International Journal on World Peace in 1988, in which she discussed how nations can realistically reduce the threat of nuclear warfare. Howes was elected as a Fellow of the American Physical Society in 1992 for the influential role that her ballistic missile research played in the negotiations for START I, a crucial disarmament agreement between the U.S. and Soviet Union signed in 1991. Her later research, specifically an article she co-authored on the "Technical Debate Over Patriot Performance In the Gulf War," also influenced national security policy. Her research demonstrated that video analysis suggested that the Patriot PAC-2 theater missile had a success rate close to 0% in the war, despite claims by the U.S. Army that the Patriot PAC-2 theater missile had a 61% success rate in the war and a 100% success rate in testing. On May 4, 1999, Dr. David C. Wright cited her research before the U.S. Senate Committee on Foreign Relations Hearing "Ballistic Missiles: Threat and Response." Using her work as evidence that weapons may seem successful in testing and fail in reality, Wright argued that the United States was not ready to deploy ballistic missile weapons, significantly aiding U.S. and Russian disarmament.

Throughout her career, Howes was devoted to advancing science education. Drawn to Ball State by the opportunity to develop a "Colloquium in Science and Math" course for non-science majors, Howes was determined to improve science education for all students. While teaching this course, she earned the nickname, "Madame Ruth, Psychic to the Stars," at Ball State University.

Howes published several articles on improving physics education in several notable journals, including the American Journal of Physics, The Physics Teacher, Physics Today, and the Journal of College Science Teachers. Howes also served as an American Association for the Advancement of Science Congressional Fellow from 1993 to 1994, working in the education office of the Senate Committee on Labor and Human Resources on improving general science policy and higher education funding. From 1994 to 1995, Howes served as program director for undergraduate physics programs at the National Science Foundation, and as chair of the American Physical Society Forum on Education in 1996. She was a leader of the American Association of Physics Teachers, serving as president from 2000 to 2001, deputy chair of the National Task Force on Undergraduate Physics, and principal author of a module for the Active Physics Writing Team. She also helped develop the AAPT Strategic Programs for Innovations in Undergraduate Education (SPIN-UP) program.

In the early 1990s, Howes began editing books, beginning with The Energy Sourcebook (American Institute of Physics, 1991), co-edited with Anthony Fainberg. While working on Women and the Use of Military Force (Lynne Rienner Publishers, 1993), Howes and co-editor Caroline Herzenberg were asked to write a chapter on the role of female physicists involved in the Manhattan Project. Most accounts had excluded the role of women in the project, and several of Howes and Herzenberg's colleagues laughed at how short their chapter would be, believing that very few women were involved. However, Howes and Herzenberg were put into contact with Naomi Livesay, who had worked at Los Alamos and gave them information on other female scientists who were instrumental in the project. As Howes and Herzenberg began following French's leads, they rapidly discovered a network of over 300 women who had been involved with the Manhattan Project. Howes and Herzenberg published an article in Physics Today on the role of female physicists at Los Alamos and later co-authored the book, Their Day in the Sun: Women of the Manhattan Project (Temple University Press, 1999). In 2015, the pair published After the War: Women in Physics in the United States (Morgan Claypool Press, 2015), which documented the careers of female physicists in the post war era.

== Recognition ==
- President, Indiana Academy of Science (2000)
- Perham Award for Indiana Women of Achievement (2003)
- Distinguished Service Citation by the American Association of Physics Teachers (2004)
- Marquette University Chapter of Sigma Pi Sigma Physics Honor Society (2005)
- Member, American Physical Society
- Member, American Association for the Advancement of Science
- Member, Association for Women in Science

== Personal life ==
Ruth Hege married physicist Robert I. Howes Jr. on June 4, 1966. Robert Howes' father, Robert I. Howes Sr., was involved in the Manhattan Project at Los Alamos as an electrical engineer.

Ruth and Bob Howes had two children, Rachel T. and Prudence N. Howes. After retiring from her position at Marquette University in 2008, Howes moved to Santa Fe, New Mexico. She died in Santa Fe on April 29, 2025, at the age of 80.

== Selected bibliography ==
=== Books ===
- The Energy Sourcebook: A Guide to Technology, Resources, and Policy (co-editor) (1991)
- Women and the Use of Military Force (1993)
- Their day in the sun: Women of the Manhattan Project | Library of Congress (1999)
- After the War: Women in Physics in the United States (2015)

=== Articles ===
- "Science and Pseudoscience: A Course for the Citizen of the Twenty-First Century" (1981)
- "Technical Debate over Patriot Performance in the Gulf War" (1999)
- "Winds of Change" (2000)
- "Why Many Undergraduate Physics Programs Are Good but Few Are Great" (2003)
