= Lysekil Municipality =

Lysekil Municipality Lysekils kommun
- Municipality
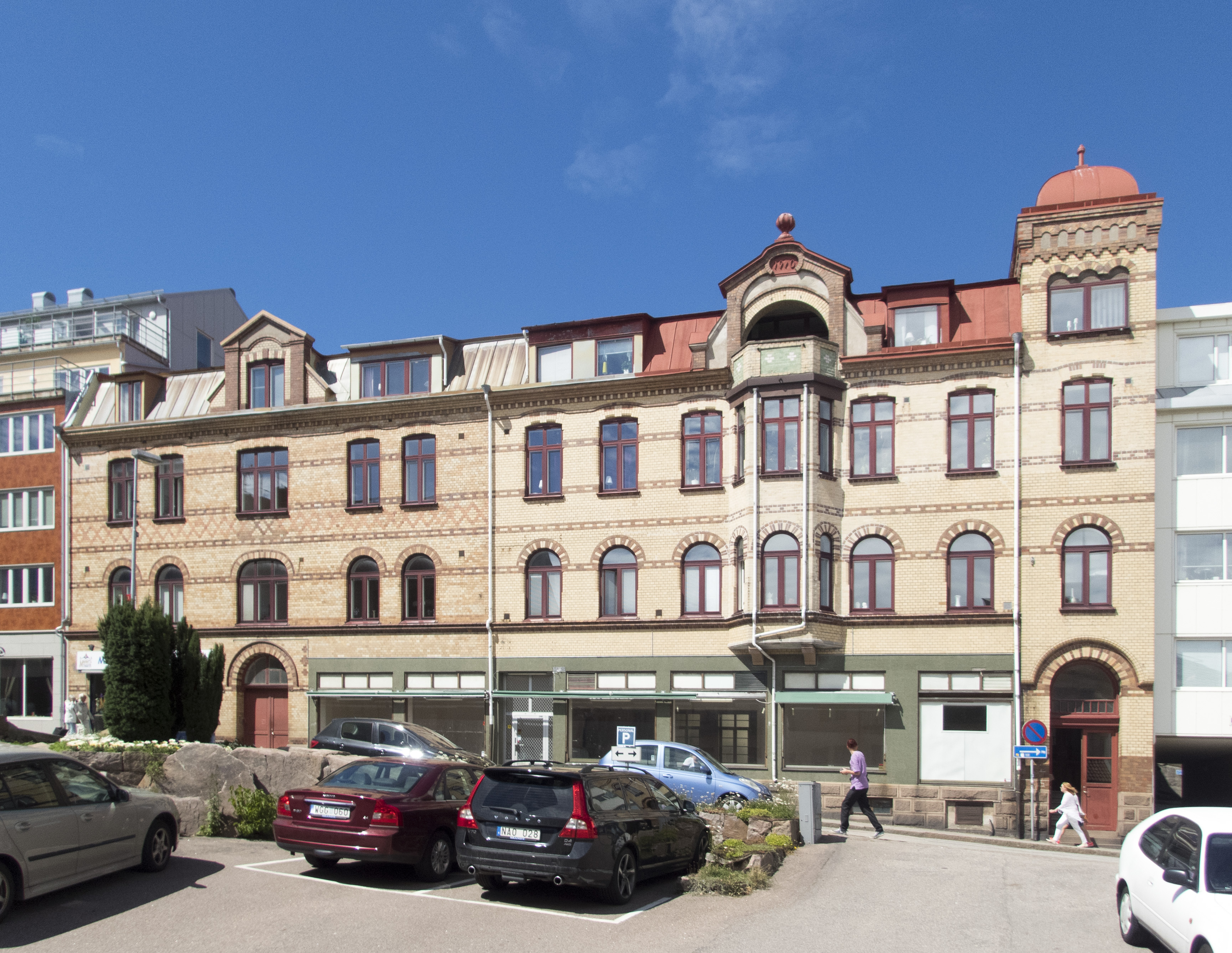
- Lysekil City Hall

- Coat of arms

- Coordinates: 58°16′28″N 11°26′15″E
- Country: Sweden
- County: Västra Götaland County
- Seat: Lysekil

Area
  - Total: 695.41 km^{2} (268.50 sq mi)
  - Land: 208.45 km^{2} (80.48 sq mi)
  - Water: 486.96 km^{2} (188.02 sq mi)
- Area as of 1 January 2014.

Population (30 June 2025)
  - Total: 13,866
  - Density: 66.520/km^{2} (172.28/sq mi)
- Time zone: UTC+1 (CET)
  - Summer (DST): UTC+2 (CEST)
- ISO 3166 code: SE
- Province: Bohuslän
- Municipal code: 1484
- Website: www.lysekil.se

Lysekil Municipality (Swedish: Lysekils kommun) is a municipality in Västra Götaland County in western Sweden. Its seat is located in the city of Lysekil.

The present municipality was formed in 1971, when the City of Lysekil (instituted as such in 1903) was amalgamated with Stångenäs and the island of Skaftö.

== Geography ==
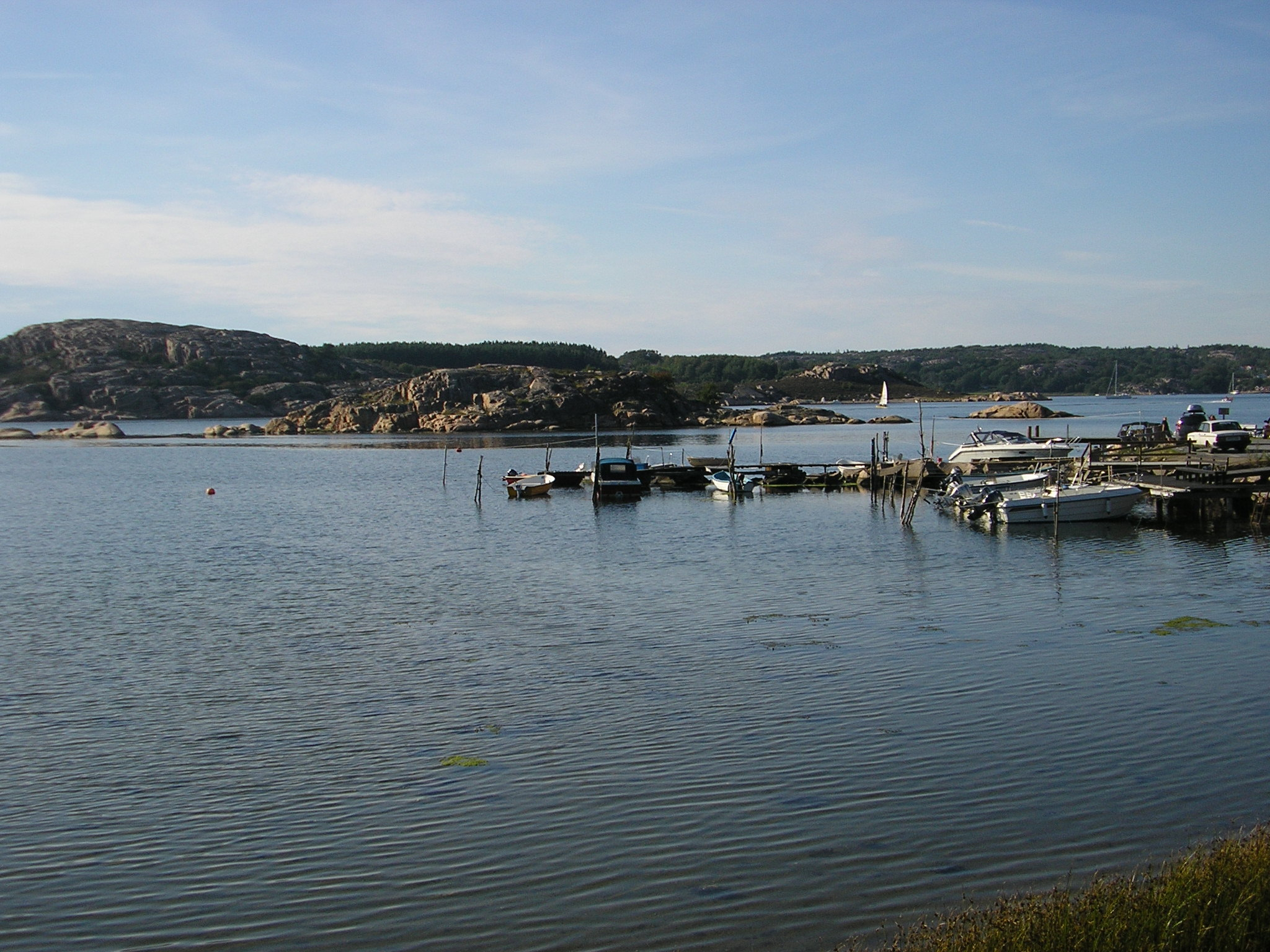
Slävik, Härnäset.

Lysekil Municipality borders to the municipalities of Sotenäs (in the north-west), Munkedal (north) and Uddevalla (east). The city of Lysekil is located on the southern tip of the municipality, by the Kattegatt strait.

The bay to the east, marking the border to Uddevalla, is called Gullmarsfjorden, or Gullmarn. It is Sweden's only true fjord. It is 25 km long, between 1–3 km wide, with a maximum depth of 118.5 meters. The depth at the mouth is only 20–40 meters on average, leading to a distinctive marine life in the fjord. Gullmaren is currently Sweden's only marine nature preservation area, and is home to several marine research institutes due to it being an easily studied microclimate.

Some of the municipal islets are considered part of the Gothenburg archipelago. Many islets are like small communities by themselves, with interesting histories of trading, fishing and stone quarrying in addition to their scenic nature.

=== Localities ===
- Lysekil (seat), 7,300 inhabitants
- Brastad, 1,800
- Lyse, 1,700
- Brodalen, 1,050
- Grundsund, 627
- Fiskebäckskil, 438
- Rixö, 357

== History ==
In Lysekil, humans have long left a mark on water, wood, soil, and stone.

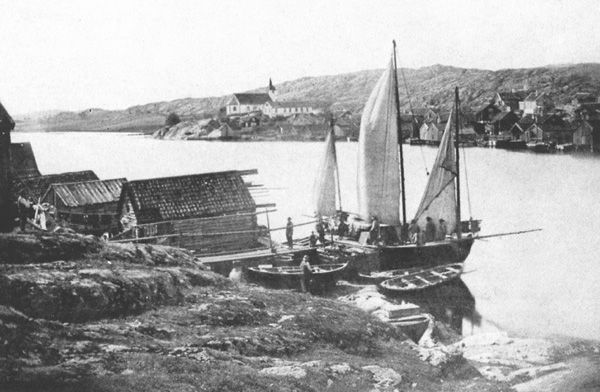
Postcard from Fiskebäckskil around 1900.

With a protected harbor jutting out toward the fisheries of Kattegatt and the North Sea, Lysekil has deep ties to the fishing and canning industry. Mirrored fish on the current municipal coat of arms and a jumping dolphin on that of 1895 show the dominance of the sea over the area.

In the 19th Century, many outsiders, especially those coming from Stockholm and the East coast whose ocean access was only the salty waters of the Baltic Sea, the granite beach and sweet water of Gullmarsfjorden made Lysekil a famous bathing location. Kallbadhuset (the cold bathing house), a somewhat exclusive and popular wooden bathing house dating from 1847, still stands in operation. Local rumor has it that the King of Sweden visited the Lysekil bathing house and specifically asked that the commoners of the town be allowed to enter the wooden walls of Kallbadhuset because he 'liked' the everyday people of Lysekil (whom otherwise were not welcome inside the Bathing house compound).

Traditionally fishing, sailing, farming, stone-cutting, and forestry formed the largest chunk of the local economy and continue today; however, petroleum products refining (Preemraff in Lyse,) light industry (Husqvarna in Brastad,) and local and international tourism (especially during the summertime,) all form a large part in the economy of the municipality.

== Herring fishing ==
Herring fishing has played a big role in the history of Lysekil. Historically, the herring collected close to the coastline in Bohuslän for long periods of time making it easy for large amounts of fish to be caught. Herring fishing was popular already during the Middle Ages but had a large impact on the local economy during the periods of 1556–1589, 1747-1809 and 1877–1906. During these years, sales of salted herring resulted in a large export market to numerous other countries.

In Lysekil there are still traces of the old herring fisheries, most of them on Härnäset, stora skeppsholmen and Saltö, as well as several factory buildings where the herring was prepared and packaged.

== Listed buildings ==
The municipality of Lysekil has three listed buildings. A listed building (byggnadsminne) is a building that is legally protected and preserved because of its cultural and historical significance. The county administrative board (Länsstyrelsen) and the Swedish national heritage board (Riksantikvarieämbetet) decides which buildings become listed buildings. The three buildings are:

- Curmanska villorna
- Wilhelmsons villa
- Härnäsets folkets hus

Other buildings and areas of cultural and historical heritage in Lysekil are protected through detailed development plans under control of the municipality. Some of those places can for example be found in the old town area (Gamlestan), Fiskebäckskil and Östersidan.

== Demographics ==
This is a demographic table based on Lysekil Municipality's electoral districts in the 2022 Swedish general election sourced from SVT's election platform, in turn taken from SCB official statistics.

In 2022 there were 14,245 residents, including 11,346 Swedish citizens of voting age. 47.5% voted for the left coalition and 51.1% for the right coalition. Indicators are in percentage points except population totals and income.

Location	Residents	Citizen adults	Left vote	Right vote	Employed	Swedish parents	Foreign heritage	Income SEK	Degree
Location			%	%					
Brastad V	1,361	1,084	45.6	52.9	75	87	13	23,155	23
Brastad Ö	1,396	1,080	46.9	52.5	86	90	10	25,603	26
Bro	1,271	1,017	48.0	49.8	89	91	9	26,643	35
Lyse	1,100	877	44.8	53.5	85	93	7	29,051	40
Lysekil Bansvik	1,400	851	54.9	42.3	55	47	53	16,841	25
Lysekil C	1,480	1,226	54.5	44.8	77	77	23	22,151	31
Lysekil Dalskogen	1,785	1,378	49.9	48.4	76	82	18	23,914	29
Lysekil Kyrkvik	1,439	1,286	47.9	51.4	76	87	13	22,913	40
Lysekil Slätten	1,590	1,256	48.2	50.4	87	90	10	30,112	44
Skaftö	1,423	1,291	38.1	60.9	81	94	6	27,080	53
Source: SVT

== Government and politics ==
Distribution of the 31 seats in the municipal council after the 2018 election:

- Social Democratic Party 8
- Lysekilspartiet 7
- Sweden Democrats 4
- Moderate Party 3
- Liberal People's Party 2
- Communist Party 2
- Centre Party 2
- Left Party 2
- Green Party 1
