= Caroline Herzenberg =

American physicist

- Born: March 25, 1932; East Orange, New Jersey
- Died: March 30, 2025 (aged 93); Chicago, Illinois
- Education: MIT, University of Chicago
- Spouse: Leonardo Herzenberg (deceased)
- Children: Karen Ann Herzenberg and Catherine Stuart Herzenberg
- Scientific career
- Fields: Low energy nuclear physics; Mössbauer spectrometry; history of women in science, technology, engineering, and mathematics
- Thesis: (1958)
- Doctoral advisor: Samuel K. Allison

Caroline Stuart Littlejohn Herzenberg (March 25, 1932 - March 30, 2025) was an American physicist.

== Family ==
Caroline Herzenberg was born Caroline Stuart Littlejohn to Caroline Dorothea Schulze and Charles Frederick Littlejohn on March 25, 1932, in East Orange, New Jersey. In the aftermath of the Great Depression, her parents decided to move to Oklahoma City Oklahoma to join her father's sister, Hilda Littlejohn Will and her family. Herzenberg grew up and attended public school in Oklahoma City. In 1961 she married Leonardo Herzenberg and is the mother of two grown children, Karen Ann Herzenberg and Catherine Stuart Herzenberg Larson.

== Education ==
After winning the Westinghouse Science Talent Search in high school, Herzenberg attended Massachusetts Institute of Technology. She was one of very few women students at M.I.T. at that time. She was awarded a bachelor's degree by M.I.T. in 1953.

For graduate study she went on to the University of Chicago. She took a class with Enrico Fermi and subsequently conducted some calculations for him. She went on to receive her master's degree from the University of Chicago in 1955. For doctoral work she turned to Samuel K. Allison, who became her thesis advisor. Her thesis research, in experimental physics, was in low energy nuclear physics, and was conducted on the 3 Mev Van de Graaff accelerator in the Research Institutes. She was awarded a PhD in 1958 by the University of Chicago.

== Career ==
Herzenberg continued at the University of Chicago for another year as a postdoctoral fellow and a research associate at the Enrico Fermi Institute for Nuclear Studies at the University of Chicago. She then went on to become a research associate in the Physics Division of Argonne National Laboratory in Illinois. In 1961 Herzenberg became an assistant professor of physics at Illinois Institute of Technology in Chicago, where she worked for five years as director of the high-voltage laboratory and the Van de Graaff accelerator, and directed experimental nuclear physics and Mössbauer research programs, supervising MS and PhD theses and undergraduate and graduate physics instruction.

After being denied tenure at Illinois Institute of Technology, she worked at IIT Research Institute from 1967 to 1971 as a research physicist and then as a senior physicist. At IIT Research Institute, she conducted her work as a principal investigator in the NASA Apollo returned lunar sample analysis program, and continued applications of Mössbauer spectrometry. Subsequently, she held a position as a visiting associate professor of physics at the University of Illinois at the Medical Center from 1971 to 1974. She was responsible for organization, instruction, and planning for the College of Pharmacy, and she supervised graduate laboratory instruction in radioisotope utilization and applications for the University of Illinois at the Medical Center. From 1975 to 1976 she spent an academic year in California at California State University, Fresno, where she was a lecturer in physics, and was involved in general physics curriculum organization and instruction and presented lectures on electromagnetic theory.

Herzenberg returned to Argonne National Laboratory in 1977, and worked there until her retirement in 2001. During this period of time at Argonne, she was engaged primarily in applications of physics in engineering and in specific areas such as radiation safety. In 1977, Herzenberg initially joined a project for developing instrumentation for process control for a new generation of coal conversion and combustion plants. Development proceeded on non-invasive techniques for measuring the composition and flow rate of coal slurries and pulverized coal in pneumatic transport in pipes. For the analysis of the composition of coal, she worked on the application of neutron-induced gamma spectrometry; while measurement of slurry flow was based on using short lived radioactivity induced in the slurry. She later worked in technology assessment and evaluation of programs in arms control verification, and radioactive waste disposal. She also worked in emergency preparedness and response for technological hazards, mainly in radiological emergency preparedness for nuclear power plants and emergency preparedness for chemical demilitarization.

== Research in the History of Science ==
Herzenberg has contributed to our knowledge of the history of women in science. She published a number of articles and chapters in books and lectured around the US on this topic. In 1986 she authored a book titled Women Scientists from Antiquity to the Present and later in 1999 with Ruth Howes coauthored another book titled Their Day in the Sun: Women of the Manhattan Project.

== Research in Physics and Related Fields ==
Following Caroline Herzenberg's doctoral research in experimental low energy nuclear physics with Samuel K. Allison as thesis advisor, her research continued at the University of Chicago during her year of postdoctoral work when she measured the products of nuclear reactions between lithium isotopes and those of beryllium and boron; research which laid foundations for future heavy ion investigation. Subsequently, her work focused on Mössbauer spectroscopy; she was engaged in pioneering research on the Mössbauer effect and was part of the team which succeeded in verifying the Mössbauer effect. She later established Mössbauer-effect research facilities at Illinois Institute of Technology and at IIT Research Institute. Turning her focus to geological applications of the effect, Herzenberg concluded that it would be possible to analyze rocks and minerals retrieved from the Moon using Mössbauer spectrometry; and she was awarded a grant from NASA to carry out Mössbauer spectrometry during the Apollo program. She served as a principal investigator in the NASA Apollo Returned Lunar Sample Analysis Program, and analyzed some of the first returned lunar samples as well as material from subsequent sample returns.

Herzenberg has authored or coauthored hundreds of scientific and technical papers, and has written a number of chapters in books dealing with scientific and technical topics.

== Honors ==
Herzenberg was the first scientist to be inducted into the Chicago Women's Hall of Fame. She was awarded an honorary Sc.D. degree by the State University of New York, Plattsburgh in 1991. As a result of her work, Herzenberg was elected a fellow of the American Association for the Advancement of Science, the American Physical Society, and the Association for Women in Science, and served as the president of the Association for Women in Science from 1988 to 1990.

== Further Activities ==
Caroline Herzenberg has had a longstanding interest in certain societal issues, largely centering on peace and justice and human rights. Already when she was an undergraduate at M.I.T., she participated in student group support of M.I.T. mathematics professor Dirk Jan Struik when he had drawn the unwelcome attention of Senator Joseph McCarthy after the advent of McCarthyism. Throughout much of her adult life, she has worked very extensively and successfully on women's issues, especially issues relating to women in science, notably with the Association for Women in Science. In conjunction with concerns about ethical issues, she developed some recognized guidelines on ethical issues in physics. A foray into politics, seeking a position as an alderman in Freeport, Illinois, was unsuccessful, but the experience guided her efforts in related activities. While in Freeport, she developed and presented a television series on science, "Camera on Science". National attention was directed at her when in 1986 she conducted independent research and published a short paper showing that Strategic Defense Initiative (SDI) weapons under development for use in defense would also be able to be used offensively. Following her retirement, Herzenberg has been active as a citizen in a variety of ways, including engaging in demonstrations and vigils in support of peace and justice and human rights and related endeavors. She has participated with the American Friends Service Committee, the 8th Day Center for Justice, Jewish Voice for Peace and a number of other groups. She occasionally writes popular material, including correspondence to newspapers. Over the years, Herzenberg obtained a pilot's license; studied Judo, Aikido, and other martial arts; and enjoyed bird watching.
