= Gustaf Ekman =

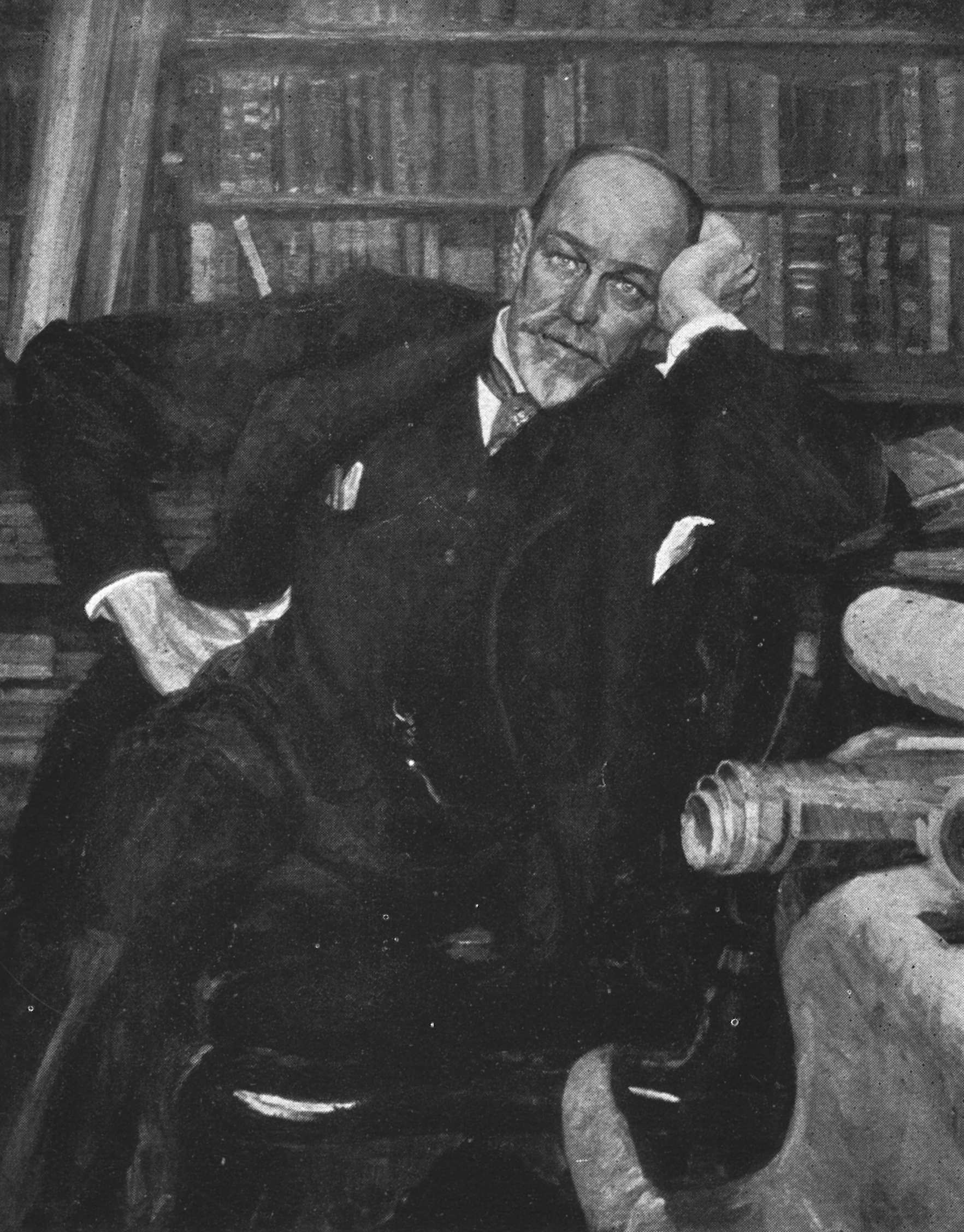
Portrait painting of Ekman in 1912 by Richard Bergh

Fredrik Gustaf Ekman (29 August 1852 – 26 February 1930) was a Swedish chemist, hydrologist and philanthropist. Along with Otto Pettersson he was involved in the determination of the atomic weight of selenium. He later spent most of his energy on marine research and was a founding member of the International Council for Exploration of the Sea.

== Life and work ==
Ekman was born in Stockholm, the son of frigate captain J. E. Ekman and his wife Baroness Kurck who came from a Finnish noble family. An illness in early age left one leg deformed. He used crutches to walk. He was educated at the Gothenburg Real school from 1866 before going to Chalmers Institute in 1870. He then went to Wiesbaden in 1873 where he studied chemistry under Carl Remigius Fresenius and then to the University of Uppsala (1877-78) where he became a close friend of fellow-student Sven Otto Pettersson. He also gained strength and began to walk with a cane. He became interested in marine research thanks to professor A. W. Cronander in Uppsala. He began to study salinity and temperature of the seas. He also collaborated with his relative Fredrik Laurentz Ekman (1830–1890) . Along with Pettersson he studied the ocean currents in Kattegat, Skagerrak and Öresund. From 1880 he was a technical director of the Carnegie sugar refinery in Gothenburg where an uncle Oscar Ekman and his father Emil served as directors. With his chemistry knowledge and technical skills he was able to increased production from 4.5 tons to 200 tons per year. He was also associated with other companies including Bofors. Along with Pettersson he was involved in establishing an oceanography research station. King Oscar II supported the venture and they created the International Council for Exploration of the Sea. In 1914 Ekman donated 100000 kronors to the University of Gothenburg to establish oceanography.

Ekman married Gerda Elisabeth Gödecke (1861-1927) in 1885.
