= Mike Ohnstad =

American politician (1926–2026)

Member of the Minnesota House of Representatives for District 19A
- In office 1973–1974

Personal details
- Born: Michas Monroe Ohnstad; August 14, 1926 Hinckley, Minnesota, U.S.
- Died: April 22, 2026 (aged 99) North Branch, Minnesota, U.S.
- Occupation: Teacher, clergyman, social worker

Michas Monroe Ohnstad (August 14, 1926 – April 22, 2026) was an American politician in the state of Minnesota. He was born in Hinckley, Minnesota. A social worker, teacher and clergyman, he attended the Minnesota School of Business, Rutgers University, University of Utah, Texas Christian University, Uppsala University, Augustana College, Western Kentucky University and Lutheran Theological Seminary. Ohnstad was also a veteran of World War II. He served in the House of Representatives for District 19A in 1973 to 1974. Ohnstad was married with four children. He died in North Branch, Minnesota, on April 22, 2026, at the age of 99.
