= Gullmarn =

Fjord on the west coast of Sweden

- Gullmarsfjorden; Gullmaren
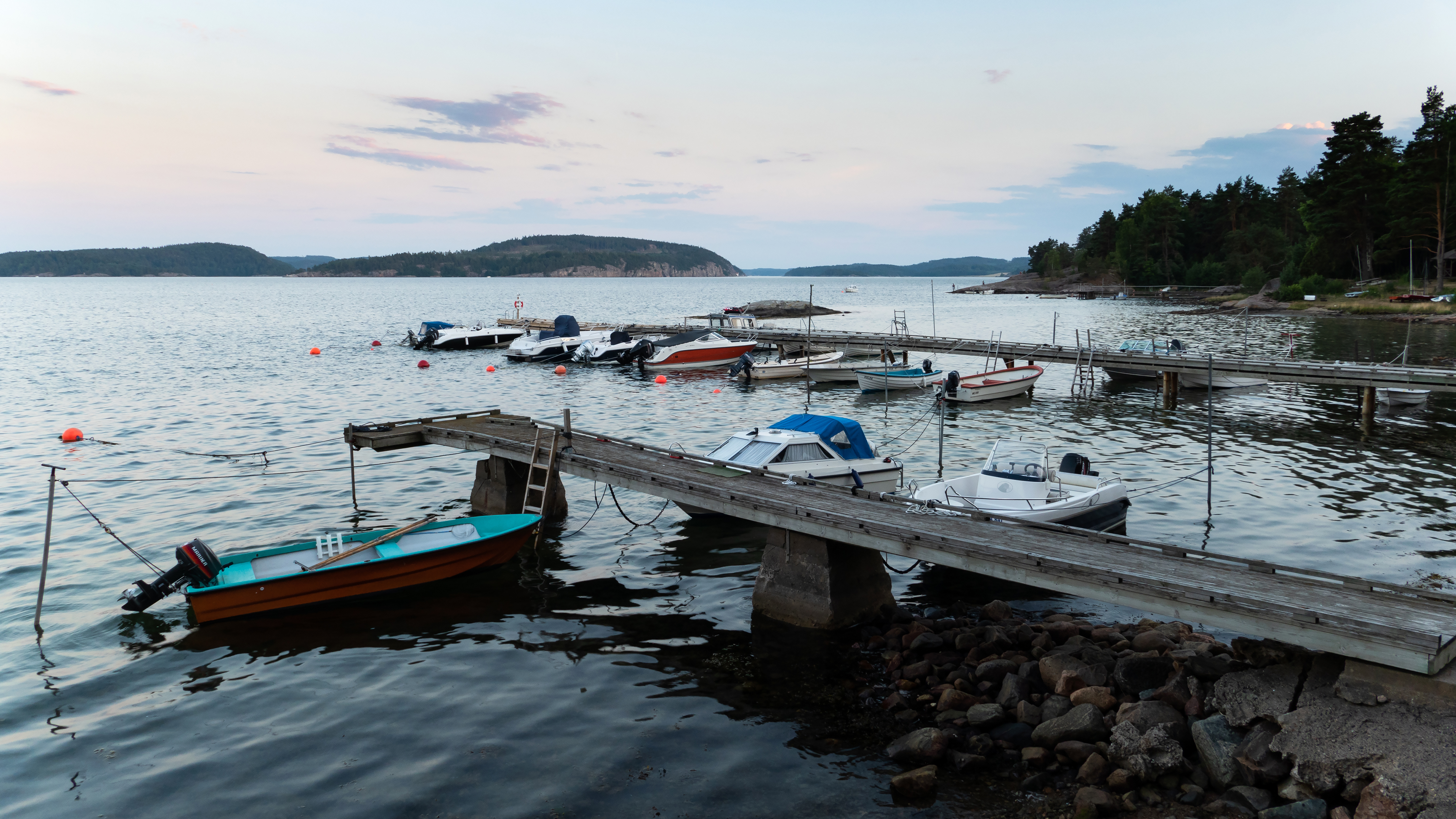
- Central Gullmarn with Stora Bornö as seen from Barkedal

- Location of Gullmarn in Västra Götaland
- Location: Västra Götaland County, Sweden
- Coordinates: 58°15′45″N 11°27′00″E
- Type: Fjord
- Primary inflows: Saltkälle fjord, Färlev fjord
- River sources: Örekilsälven
- Primary outflows: Skagerrak
- Average depth: 45 m (148 ft)
- Max. depth: 125 m (410 ft)
- Frozen: shallow parts Jan-Feb
- Islands: Skaftö; Lindholmen; Stora Bornö; Lilla Bornö
- Settlements: Lysekil

Gullmarn, also known as Gullmarsfjorden or Gullmaren, is a threshold fjord in the middle of Bohuslän Archipelago on the west coast of Sweden. It is the largest of the Bohuslän fjords with a length of 25 km (16 mi) and a width ranging from 1–3 km (0.62–1.86 mi). At its mouth, the depth is 45 m (148 ft), plunging to 125 m (410 ft) at its greatest depth near Alsbäck. The name "Gullmarn" means "God's sea" and comes from Old Norse. At its northern end the fjord branches into the Färlev and Saltkälle fjords.

Its shoreline has steep rock walls marked by many valleys containing streams and rivers. Deeply cut ravines are typical and steep cliffs alternate with sandy beaches and meadows.

The fjord was designated as Sweden's first marine conservation area in 1983. The nature reserve covers 16,499 ha (40,770 acres) and parts of several municipalities. Because of the varying depths of the fjord the marine wildlife is abundant and diverse. There are many unique marine animals that are not found in the more shallow areas of the fjord. The shallow waters also provide habitat for a broad range of bird species. Three scientific research stations have been established in the conservation area.

== See also ==
- Brofjorden
- Stora Bornö
