= The Kelly Clarkson Show season 7 =

US TV show (2025–2026)

The Kelly Clarkson Show
- Season 7
- Starring: Kelly Clarkson
- No. of episodes: 175

Release
- Original network: Syndication
- Original release: September 29, 2025 – August 31, 2026

Season chronology
- ← Previous; Season 6

The seventh and final season of The Kelly Clarkson Show began airing on September 29, 2025. Clarkson announced on February 2, 2026, that this season would be the show's last.

== Cameo-oke ==
List of Cameo-oke guests this season:

- Leona Lewis
- David Archuleta
- Vincent Mason
- Johnny Gill
- Aloe Blacc
- Russell Dickerson
- Kevin Jonas
- Warren Zeiders
- The Temptations
- Thalía
- Gabby Samone
- Jonathan McReynolds & Jamal Roberts
- Brandon Lake
- Corbyn Besson
- Natalie Grant
- MAX
- Keith Sweat
- D. Smooth
- Simu Liu
- P!nk & Willow Sage Hart
- Hunter Hayes
- Corinne Bailey Rae
- Q Parker
- Raheem DeVaughn
- Melissa Etheridge
- Hudson Westbrook
- Elizabeth Nichols
- Alexia Jayy
- Ari Lennox
- Ben Gallaher
- Durand Bernarr
- Mikenley Brown
- Rita Wilson
- Julia Cole
- Linda Perry
- Girl Named Tom
- JW Griffin
- Liv Ciara
- Jessi Collins
- Ashley McBryde

== Episodes ==
No. overall	No. in season	Original release date	Guest(s)	Musical/entertainment guest(s)	"Kellyoke" cover / "Kellyoke" Classic
1,059	1	September 29, 2025	Margot Robbie, Colin Farrell	N/A	"Blinding Lights" by The Weeknd
Season Premiere
1,060	2	September 30, 2025	Matthew McConaughey, Lily James, Chicago Scream Club	N/A	"Say My Name" by Destiny's Child
1,061	3	October 1, 2025	Scarlett Johansson, June Squibb	N/A	"Walking on Sunshine" by Katrina and the Waves
It's Never Too Late Hour
1,062	4	October 2, 2025	Lionel Richie, Grace Van Patten, Nick Offerman, Laila Lockhart Kramer	Buena Vista Social Club	"Love So Soft" by Kelly Clarkson
1,063	5	October 3, 2025	Dwayne Johnson, Emily Blunt, Jimmy Fallon, Bozoma Saint John, Joanna Gaines	Good Charlotte	"Another One Bites the Dust" by Queen
1,064	6	October 6, 2025	Sylvester Stallone, Garrett Hedlund, Jay Will	N/A	"We Can't Be Friends (Wait for Your Love)" by Ariana Grande
1,065	7	October 7, 2025	Sarah McLachlan	N/A	"Follow Your Arrow" by Kacey Musgraves (Encore)
Songs & Stories Hour
1,066	8	October 8, 2025	Channing Tatum, Madelaine Petsch, Taylor Polidore, Crystle Stewart	Ravyn Lenae	"I'm Your Baby Tonight" by Whitney Houston
1,067	9	October 9, 2025	Eugene Levy, Mark Ronson, Pierson Fodé	KIRBY	"I Lied, I'm Sorry" by Chloe Qisha (Encore)
1,068	10	October 10, 2025	Lester Holt, Leona Lewis, Erin Kellyman	N/A	"Bleeding Love" by Leona Lewis
International Day of the Girl, "Bleeding Love" performed by Cameo-oke guest Leona Lewis
1,069	11	October 13, 2025	Julia Roberts, William Jackson Harper, Bill Rancic, Giuliana Rancic	N/A	"Hello" by Kelly Clarkson (Encore)
1,070	12	October 14, 2025	Marion Cotillard, Shonda Rhimes	SYML	"I'll Be" by Edwin McCain (Encore)
1,071	13	October 15, 2025	Mariska Hargitay, Michael Chernus	N/A	"Cry" by Kelly Clarkson (Encore)
1,072	14	October 16, 2025	Reese Witherspoon, Harlan Coben, Danielle Kartes	N/A	"I Hope I Never Fall In Love" by Maren Morris
1,073	15	October 17, 2025	Rose Byrne, Mason Thames, Scott Hoying, Mark Hoying	Priscilla Block	"I Got a New One" by Elizabeth Nichols (Encore)
1,074	16	October 20, 2025	Zachary Quinto, Brittany Snow	David Archuleta	"Créme Brulée" by David Archuleta
"Créme Brulée" performed by Cameo-oke guest David Archuleta.
1,075	17	October 21, 2025	Leslie Jones, Annabella Sciorra, Dana Delany, Colman Domingo	Adam Mac	"Let Your Tears Fall" by Kelly Clarkson
1,076	18	October 22, 2025	Ethan Hawke, Renée Elise Goldsberry, John Edward, Liz Parker	Brett Young	"Hell is a Dancefloor" by Vincent Mason
"Hell is a Dancefloor" performed by Cameo-oke guest Vincent Mason.
1,077	19	October 23, 2025	Kristen Bell, Gaten Matarazzo, Julie Foudy, Abby Wambach	Of Monsters and Men	"Never Enough" from The Greatest Showman (Kelly Clarkson version)
1,078	20	October 24, 2025	Dave Franco, Jackie Tohn	Whiskey Myers	"One Night" by Johnny Gill
"One Night" performed by Cameo-oke guest Johnny Gill
1,079	21	October 27, 2025	Adam Brody, Timothy Simons, Hannah Berner	Alexandra Kay	"Never Be the Same" by Camila Cabello
1,080	22	October 28, 2025	Jeremy Renner, Becky Robinson, Sarah McLachlan	Alexander Stewart	"One Good Thing"
"One Good Thing" performed by Cameo-oke guest Aloe Blacc
1,081	23	October 29, 2025	Maya Rudolph, Joel Kim Booster, Jessica Capshaw, Colby Stevenson	Lindsay Ell	"Carry It Well" by Sam Fischer
1,082	24	October 30, 2025	Roy Wood Jr., Alex Edelman, Gbemisola Ikumelo, Oscar Nunez, Pat Benatar, Neil Giraldo	Maggie Rose & Grace Potter	"She's So High" by Tal Bachman (Encore)
1,083	25	October 31, 2025	Leanne Morgan, Lance Bass, Kid Ace, Amber Ruffin	Ariana and the Rose	"Sooner or Later" by Madonna
Halloween
1,084	26	November 3, 2025	Emma Thompson, Brian Jordan Alvarez	Liam St. John	"Indigo" by Sam Barber & Avery Anna
1,085	27	November 4, 2025	Liam Hemsworth, Phoebe Robinson, Cameron Crowe	N/A	"White Lies" by Sam Ryder (Encore)
1,086	28	November 5, 2025	Jenna Bush Hager, Ariel Sullivan, Toni Braxton, Iain Stirling	Jourdin Pauline	"For Cryin' Out Loud" by Finneas (Encore)
1,087	29	November 6, 2025	Sarah Snook, Kathleen Madigan, Mariska Hargitay	Hazlett	"Uptown Girl" by Billy Joel (Encore)
1,088	30	November 7, 2025	Isla Fisher, Penn Jillette, Teller, Jason Brown	Goldie Boutilier	"You Lie" (Encore)
1,089	31	November 10, 2025	Jesse Eisenberg, Justice Smith, Dominic Sessa, Ariana Greenblatt, Oksana Masters, Aaron Pike, E. Lockhart	N/A	"Happen to Me" by Russell Dickerson
"Happen to Me" performed by Cameo-oke guest Russell Dickerson
1,090	32	November 11, 2025	Sheryl Lee Ralph, Lacey Chabert, Liza Colón-Zayas	Drake Milligan	"Total Eclipse of the Heart" by Bonnie Tyler (Encore)
Veterans Day
1,091	33	November 12, 2025	Ken Jeong, Mary Lynn Rajskub	Maggie Lindemann	"Racing" by Tony K (Encore)
1,092	34	November 13, 2025	Rosamund Pike, Jake Lacy, Murray Hill	Yeonjun	"All the Things She Said" by t.A.T.u (Encore)
1,093	35	November 14, 2025	Sylvester Stallone, Adam Brody, Timothy Simons, Lionel Richie, Ethan Hawke, Shonda Rhimes	Cody Jinks	"You Lie" by Cee Cee Chapman (Encore)
Bonus Tracks
1,094	36	November 17, 2025	Jenny Slate, Chelsea Frei, Melvin Gregg, Ramona Young	N/A	"Damn I Was Your Lover" by Sophie B. Hawkins (Encore)
1,095	37	November 18, 2025	Utkarsh Ambudkar, Jason Clarke, Rhonda Halbert, Jason Halbert	N/A	"All by Myself" by Eric Carmen (Encore)
1,096	38	November 19, 2025	Jeff Goldblum, Jon M. Chu	Lily Rose	"If I Only Had a Brain" by Harold Arlen and Yip Harburg (Encore)
"Wicked: For Good"
1,097	39	November 20, 2025	Andrew Garfield, Ayo Edebiri, Marcia Gay Harden, Lauren Roberts, Rocky Kanaka	N/A	"I Melt with You" by Modern English
1,098	40	November 21, 2025	Cynthia Erivo, Paul Tazewell, Mel C	Taemin	"Over The Rainbow" by Judy Garland (Encore)
1,099	41	November 24, 2025	Brendan Fraser, Wagner Moura, Morgan Stevenson Cooper	Laura Anglade	"Better Be Tough" by Ella Langley
1,100	42	November 25, 2025	Ted Danson, Mary Steenburgen	N/A	"Building a Mystery" by Sarah McLachlan (Encore)
1,101	43	November 26, 2025	Julianne Moore, Tom Bateman	N/A	"Dark Side" by Kelly Clarkson (Encore)
1,102	44	December 1, 2025	Michelle Monaghan, Wendi McLendon-Covey, David Alan Grier, Kevin Jonas	N/A	"Changing" by Kevin Jonas
Cameo-oke: "Changing" by Kevin Jonas
1,103	45	December 2, 2025	Sarah Hyland, Mae Martin	The Happy Fits	"Insensitive" by Jann Arden (Encore)
1,104	46	December 3, 2025	Chloe Grace Moretz, Justine Lupe, Jonathan Bennett	Ruston Kelly	"Weren't for the Wind" by Ella Langley
1,105	47	December 4, 2025	Josh Hutcherson, Marissa Bode, Gesine Bullock-Prado, Jessica Sanchez	Aiyana-Lee	"War Paint" by Kelly Clarkson (Encore)
1,106	48	December 5, 2025	Kristen Bell, Justine Lupe, Emma Thompson, Rosamund Pike, Maya Rudolph, Cameron Crowe, Liam Hemsworth	N/A	"Santa, Can't You Hear Me" by Kelly Clarkson & Ariana Grande (Encore)
"Unwrapping Extras" Hour
1,107	49	December 8, 2025	Rhea Seehorn, Noah Jupe, Jacobi Jupe, Chris Daughtry	Daughtry	"Christmas Eve" by Kelly Clarkson (Encore)
1,108	50	December 9, 2025	Paul Mescal, Jessie Buckley, Matt Rogers, Sheryl Lee Ralph	Faouzia	"You for Christmas" by Kelly Clarkson (Encore)
1,109	51	December 10, 2025	Melissa McCarthy, Emilia Jones	N/A	"White Christmas" by Kelly Clarkson
1,110	52	December 11, 2025	Chloe Fineman, Jordan Firstman	N/A	"How Great Thou Art"
Cameo-oke: "How Great Thou Art" by Warren Zeiders
1,111	53	December 12, 2025	Zoe Saldaña, Lucien Laviscount, Melissa McCarthy	N/A	"Silent Night" by The Temptations
Cameo-oke: "Silent Night" by The Temptations
1,112	54	December 15, 2025	Kate Winslet, Lucas Bravo	Pentatonix	"Every Christmas" by Kelly Clarkson
1,113	55	December 16, 2025	Daisy Ridley, Noah Schnapp, Chloe Flower	Chloe Flower	"Run Run Rudolph" by Chuck Berry; Kelly Clarkson version (Encore)
1,114	56	December 17, 2025	Mark Hamill, Tom Kenny, Ice Spice, Bobby Berk, Thomas Sadoski	N/A	"Oh Come, Oh Come Emmanuel" by Kelly Clarkson
1,115	57	December 18, 2025	Thalía, George Smith, Ciree Nash, Stevie Van Zandt, Johnny Cannizzaro	Old Crow Medicine Show	"SANTA (Crush on You)" by Thalía
Cameo-oke: "SANTA (Crush on You)" by Thalía
1,116	58	December 19, 2025	Kate Hudson, Hugh Jackman, Ella Anderson	Drew Baldridge & Mickey Guyton	"Wrapped in Red" by Kelly Clarkson (Encore)
1,117	59	January 12, 2026	Kenan Thompson, Camilla Luddington	Brooke Combe	"No One Else Like Me" by The Red Clay Strays
1,118	60	January 13, 2026	Kal Penn, Arden Cho	N/A	"What It Sounds Like" by KPop Demon Hunters
1,119	61	January 14, 2026	Idris Elba, Sadie Sink, Danielle Steel, Giuliana Rancic	Cavetown	"Complicated" by Gabby Samone
Cameo-oke: "Complicated" by Gabby Samone
1,120	62	January 15, 2026	Ben Affleck, Matt Damon, Kyle Chandler, Mary J. Blige	Katelyn Tarver	"I Wish I Knew How to Quit You" by Sombr
1,121	63	January 16, 2026	Elle Fanning, Madison Beer, Darlene Love, Shaun Cassidy, Mike Ruiz, Sadie Sink	N/A	"Still" by Jonathan McReynolds & Jamal Roberts
Cameo-oke: "Still" by Jonathan McReynolds & Jamal Roberts
1,122	64	January 19, 2026	Jason Momoa, Jacob Batalon, Tom Blyth, Emily Bader	N/A	"Hard Fought Hallelujah" by Brandon Lake
Cameo-oke: "Hard Fought Hallelujah" by Brandon Lake
1,123	65	January 20, 2026	Billy Bob Thornton, Cary Elwes, Diana Flores	N/A	"Blink" by Corbyn Besson
Cameo-oke: "Blink" by Corbyn Besson
1,124	66	January 21, 2026	Jenny McCarthy, Diego Calva, Brad Meltzer	N/A	"His Eye Is on the Sparrow" by Natalie Grant
Cameo-oke: "His Eyes on the Sparrow" by Natalie Grant
1,125	67	January 22, 2026	Emilia Clarke, Haley Lu Richardson, Ethan Slater, Lucas Bravo, Ted Danson, Mary Steenburgen, Colton Underwood	Alemeda	"Love So Soft" by Kelly Clarkson (Encore)
1,126	68	January 23, 2026	Alan Cumming, Kali Reis, Del Gato Rescue	N/A	"The Thing I Love" by MAX
Cameo-oke: "The Thing I Love" by MAX
1,127	69	January 26, 2026	Chelsea Handler, Retta, Ricki Lake, Altadena Girls	Willis	"Say My Name" by Destiny's Child (Encore)
1,128	70	January 27, 2026	Amanda Seyfried, François Arnaud, Black Girl Hockey Club	N/A	"Time" by Olivia Dean
1,129	71	January 28, 2026	Paris Hilton, Keith Sweat, Danielle Kartes	Keith Sweat	"Working" by Keith Sweat
Cameo-oke: "Working" by Keith Sweat
1,130	72	January 29, 2026	Denis Leary, Jeff Kinney	N/A	"Breakaway" by Kelly Clarkson
Guest host: Amber Ruffin; Cameo-oke: "Breakaway" performed by D. Smooth
1,131	73	January 30, 2026	Holly Hunter, Kerrice Brooks, George Hawkins, Sandro Rosta	N/A	"Take You High" by Kelly Clarkson
1,132	74	February 2, 2026	Simu Liu, Bert Kreischer, Arden Myrin	N/A	"In the Stars" by Benson Boone
Cameo-oke: "In the Stars" performed by Simu Liu
1,133	75	February 3, 2026	Keke Palmer, Jack Whitehall, Amber Ruffin, Luke Thompson, Da Brat and Judy	N/A	"Hands to Myself" by Selena Gomez
Kelly-lympic games
1,134	76	February 4, 2026	Kyle MacLachlan, Aaron Moten, Maxim Naumov	Jonathan Groff	"I Melt with You" by Modern English (Encore)
1,135	77	February 5, 2026	Kelly Rowland, Method Man, Robin Thede, Annie Gonzalez, Katie Chin, Mychal Threets	Kenny Sharp	"Nothing Breaks Like a Heart" by Mark Ronson feat. Miley Cyrus (Damiano David version)
1,136	78	February 23, 2026	Naomi Watts, Paul Anthony Kelly, Connor Hines	The Lone Bellow	"Take Me Home" by Phil Collins
1,137	79	February 24, 2026	Tracy Morgan, Ryan Michelle Bathe, Hilarie Burton	N/A	"Yeehaw" by Filmore
Cameo-oke: "Yeehaw" by Filmore
1,138	80	February 25, 2026	Gabriel Basso, Bunnie Xo, Shane Duffy	Kashus Cullpepper	"Carry It Well" by Sam Fischer (Encore)
1,139	81	February 26, 2026	Wunmi Mosaku, Mason Gooding, MrBeast	Moonchild	"Never Be the Same" by Camila Cabello (Encore)
1,140	82	February 27, 2026	Sterling K. Brown, Amber Ruffin, Yerin Ha, Alison Sweeney	Freya Skye	"Eat Me Alive" by Cami Petyn
1,141	83	March 2, 2026	Darren Criss, Shoshana Bean	P!nk & Shoshana Bean	"Hopeless War" from The Outsiders
P!nk Week; Broadway in 6A; Guest Host: Pink; Cameo-oke: "Hopeless War" performed by Pink and Willow Sage Hart
1,142	84	March 3, 2026	Neve Campbell, Courteney Cox, Chloe Kim, Wunmi Mosaku, Marin Alsop	N/A	"Lighthouse" by Kelly Clarkson
Guest host Pink; "Lighthouse" performed by Pink
1,143	85	March 4, 2026	Allison Williams, Renée Elise Goldsberry, Dr. Shefali, Elana Meyers Taylor	N/A	"River" by Bishop Briggs
Guest Host: Pink; "River" performed by Pink
1,144	86	March 5, 2026	Nate Bargatze, Kandi Burruss, Amanda Cohen, Jameson Hart	N/A	"Die on This Hill" by Sienna Spiro
Guest Host: Pink; "Die on This Hill" performed by Pink
1,145	87	March 6, 2026	Morgan Freeman, Priyanka Chopra, Anderson Paak, Black Girls With Green Thumbs, Hayley Scamurra	N/A	"Time after Time" by Cyndi Lauper
Guest Host: Pink; co-host: Kerri Kenney-Silver; "Time after Time" performed by Pink
1,146	88	March 9, 2026	Maggie Gyllenhaal, Annette Bening, Hunter Hayes	Joseph	"Evergreen" by Hunter Hayes
Cameo-oke: "Evergreen" performed by Hunter Hayes
1,147	89	March 10, 2026	Daniel Radcliffe, Rob Rausch	N/A	"Put Your Records On" by Corinne Bailey Rae
Cameo-oke: "Put Your Records On" by Corinne Bailey Rae
1,148	90	March 11, 2026	Jenna Bush Hager, Sheinelle Jones, Tom Ellis, Colin Cowie, Tom Blyth, Emily Bader	N/A	"Let Your Tears Fall" by Kelly Clarkson (Encore)
1,149	91	March 12, 2026	Viola Davis, James Patterson, Jo Koy, Gabriel Iglesias, Joshua Jackson	The Fray	"I'm Your Baby Tonight" by Whitney Houston (Encore)
1,150	92	March 13, 2026	Simon Baker, Maika Monroe, Tyriq Withers, Robin Arzon, Madison Beer	i-dle	"I Hope I Never Fall in Love" by Maren Morris (Encore)
1,151	93	March 16, 2026	Steve Carell, Danielle Deadwyler, Phil Dunster, Charly Clive, Amber Ruffin	The Cast of Bigfoot	"A Lesson in Leavin'" by Dottie West
1,152	94	March 17, 2026	Derek Hough, Mikaela Hoover	Leah Blevins	"Coraline" by Lyn Lapid
1,153	95	March 18, 2026	Adrien Brody, Sarah Pidgeon, Alex Aster, Wagner Moura	N/A	"Blinding Lights" by The Weeknd (Encore)
1,154	96	March 19, 2026	Jamie Lee Curtis, Caitriona Balfe	N/A	"Weren't for the Wind" by Ella Langley (Encore)
1,155	97	March 20, 2026	Ariana DeBose, Golda Rosheuvel, Jason Chambers	Aubrie Sellers	"We Can't Be Friends" by Ariana Grande (Encore)
1,156	98	March 23, 2026	Sarah Michelle Gellar, Arielle Kebbel, Nick Viall, Natalie Joy	Alex Isley	"What It Sounds Like" by KPop Demon Hunters (Encore)
1,157	99	March 24, 2026	Jenna Dewan, Stephen Moyer, Andrew McCarthy	Mon Rovîa	"Indigo" by Sam Barber & Avery Anna (Encore)
1,158	100	March 25, 2026	Zach Braff, Erika Alexander, Guy Fieri, Bert Kreischer, Arden Myrin, John Crist	Brit Taylor	"Here It Goes Again" by OK Go
1,159	101	March 26, 2026	Kurt Russell, Grace Gummer, Daniel Kwan	Chess	"Beg" and "Put It On" by Q Parker
Cameo-oke: "Beg" and "Put It On" by Q Parker
1,160	102	March 27, 2026	Demi Lovato, Gail Simmons, Tom Colicchio, Kristen Kish, Kelly Rowland, Method Man	N/A	"I Will Wait" by Mumford & Sons (Encore)
Guest Host: Andy Cohen
1,161	103	March 30, 2026	Lea Michele, Eric Winter	Baekhyun	"Hundred Mile High" by Cameron Whitcomb
1,162	104	March 31, 2026	Kate Mara, Brittany Broski, Petra Lord, Gigi Gorgeous	N/A	"You" by Raheem DeVaughn
Cameo-oke: "You" by Raheem DeVaughn
1,163	105	April 1, 2026	Ashley Graham, Questlove, Dave Coulier	N/A	"Walking on Sunshine" by Katrina and the Waves (Encore)
1,164	106	April 2, 2026	Maura Tierney, Jay Jurden, Utkarsh Ambudkar	N/A	"Another One Bites the Dust" by Queen (Encore)
Guest Host: Amber Ruffin
1,165	107	April 3, 2026	Bradley Whitford, Amy Landecker, Millicent Simmonds, Mario Carbone	Paul Cauthen	"What This Could Be" by Joe Jonas
1,166	108	April 6, 2026	Billy Porter	Ella Mai	"Never Enough" by The Greatest Showman (Encore)
1,167	109	April 7, 2026	Patrick Wilson, Ted McGinley, Idris Elba	The Maine	"Miss Me Too" by Griff (Encore)
1,168	110	April 8, 2026	Melissa Etheridge, Camila Morrone, Sonia Raman	Flatland Cavalry	"Bein' Alive" by Melissa Etheridge
Cameoke: "Bein' Alive" by Melissa Etheridge
1,169	111	April 9, 2026	Halle Bailey, Regé-Jean Page, Adam Richman, Ben Affleck, Matt Damon, Kyle Chandler	Noah Cyrus feat. Billy Ray Cyrus	"Cut!" by Maren Morris featuring Julia Michaels
1,170	112	April 10, 2026	Dan Levy, Taylor Ortega, Jack Innanen, Will Packer	Kota the Friend	"Painted You Pretty" by Hudson Westbrook
Cameoke: "Painted You Pretty" by Hudson Westbrook
1,171	113	April 13, 2026	Joel McHale, Antony Starr, Jennifer Lee	Jamie MacDonald	"Blues in the Night" by Ella Fitzgerald (Encore)
1,172	114	April 14, 2026	Bryan Cranston, Jane Kaczmarek, Storm Reid, Danielle Kartes	N/A	"I Wish I Knew How to Quit You" by Sombr (Encore)
1,173	115	April 15, 2026	Elle Fanning, Landon Donovan	Monsta X	"No One Else Like Me" by The Red Clay Strays (Encore)
1,174	116	April 16, 2026	Bob Odenkirk, Anna Cathcart, Steve Carell, Danielle Deadwyler, Phil Dunster, Chary Clive	N/A	"I Will (When You Do)" by Avery Anna (Encore)
1,175	117	April 17, 2026	Nick Offerman, Aaron Tveit, Dav Pilkey, Anthony Davis	Dasha	"I Got a New One" by Elizabeth Nichols
Cameoke: "I Got a New One" by Elizabeth Nichols
1,176	118	April 20, 2026	Jaafar Jackson, Juliano Valdi, Charithra Chandran, Carol Connors	Chad King	"In My Head" by Gryffin with Kaskade featuring Nu-La
1,177	119	April 21, 2026	Oscar Isaac, Carey Mulligan, Steven R. Schirripa, Alexia Jayy, Paul Mescal, Jessie Buckley	N/A	"Rent Free" by Alexia Jayy
Cameoke: "Rent Free" by Alexia Jayy
1,178	120	April 22, 2026	Elizabeth Banks, Billy Magnussen	N/A	"When My Fingers Find Your Strings" by Jeff Daniels (Encore)
1,179	121	April 23, 2026	Colman Domingo, Patrick Ball, Ari Lennox, Kyle MacLachlan, Aaron Moten	N/A	"Mobbin in DC" by Ari Lennox
Cameoke: "Mobbin in DC" by Ari Lennox
1,180	122	April 24, 2026	John Lithgow, Aya Cash, Taylor Dearden, Andrew Walker	Leslie Grace	"Say It Ain't So" by Weezer (Encore)
Kelly's birthday
1,181	123	April 27, 2026	Justin Theroux, Marta Milans	N/A	"Don't You Wanna Stay" by Jason Aldean ft. Kelly Clarkson (Encore)
Guest host: Willie Geist
1,182	124	April 28, 2026	Tony Danza, Jutes, Melissa Ben-Ishay	Rozzi	"Not That I Care" by Willie Nelson (Encore)
Guest host: Mario Lopez
1,183	125	April 29, 2026	Chris O'Donnell, Helen J. Shen, Luke Thompson, Yerin Ha	Taj Mahal	"Time" by Olivia Dean (Encore)
1,184	126	April 30, 2026	Yahya Abdul-Mateen, Lisa Vanderpump, Ally Maki	Yami Safdie & Alejandro Sanz	"Cruel" by Kelly Clarkson
1,185	127	May 1, 2026	Padma Lakshmi, Max Burkholder	N/A	"I Lied, I'm Sorry" by Chole Qisha (Encore)
1,186	128	May 4, 2026	Andy Serkis, Laufey	Girli	"The Middle" by Jimmy Eat World (Encore)
Guest hosts: Tara Lipinski & Johnny Weir
1,187	129	May 5, 2026	Ellen Burstyn, Charles Melton, Robert Smigel,	Willa Ford	"Ain't That Lonely Yet" by Dwight Yoakam (Encore)
1,188	130	May 6, 2026	Goldie Hawn, Daniel Dae Kim, Anna Konkle	N/A	"I'll Take You" by Ben Gallaher
Cameoke: "I'll Take You" by Ben Gallaher
1,189	131	May 7, 2026	Sally Field, Lewis Pullman, Camila Morrone, Gloria Harrison-Hall	N/A	"The Way It Is" by Bruce Hornsby (Encore)
1,190	132	May 8, 2026	Jon Bernthal, Sepideh Moafi	Buddy Red	"Beautiful Things" by Benson Boone (Encore)
Mother’s Day Episode
1,191	133	May 11, 2026	Luke Evans, Stephanie Hsu, Isa Briones, Shea McGee	Ghost Hounds	"Austin (Boots Stop Workin)" by Dasha
1,192	134	May 12, 2026	Cedric the Entertainer, Parker McCollum, Jenna Bush Hager	N/A	"Hands to Myself" by Selena Gomez (Encore)
1,193	135	May 13, 2026	Michael Urie, Maddie Ziegler, Adrien Brody, Jack Whitehall	N/A	"Stranger in My House" by Tamia (Encore)
Guest host: Andy Cohen
1,194	136	May 14, 2026	Josh Groban, Jalen Thomas Brooks, Kyle Cooke, Carl Radke	Josh Groban	"Flowers" by Miley Cyrus (Encore)
1,195	137	May 15, 2026	Scott Foley, Whitney Leavitt, LJ Benet, Brad Meltzer	LJ Benet and Maria Wirries	"Am I Okay" by Durand Bernarr
Cameo-oke: "Am I Okay" by Durand Bernarr
1,196	138	May 18, 2026	Nicole Scherzinger, Kimberly Wyatt, Ashley Roberts, Morgan Radford, Scott Tacinelli, Angie Rito, Eric Winter	N/A	"Take You High" by Kelly Clarkson (Encore)
Guest host: Andy Cohen
1,197	139	May 19, 2026	Cole Hauser, Kelly Reilly, Chloe East, Joshua Henry, Caissie Levy, Brandon Uranowitz	All-American Rejects	"Babylon" by David Gray (Encore)
1,198	140	May 20, 2026	Geena Davis, Beth Stern, Elisa Port	Schmigadoon! cast	"Island" by Tony K (Encore)
1,199	141	May 21, 2026	Paul Bettany, Will Sharpe, Michaela Jaé Rodriguez, Mya, Katherine Legge	Jobi Riccio	"Take Me Home" by Phil Collins (Encore)
1,200	142	May 22, 2026	Brooke Shields, Ella Bright, Clint Black, Matthew Schaefer	N/A	"Coraline" by Lyn Lapid (Encore)
1,201	143	May 26, 2026	John Travolta, Ella Bleu Travolta, Clark Shotwell, Kelly Eviston-Quinnett	SIX: The Musical	"Bathroom Stall" by Mikenley Brown
Cameo-oke: "Bathroom Stall" by Mikenley Brown
1,202	144	May 27, 2026	Rita Wilson, Sue Bird, Cat Cora	Claire Rosinkranz	"Diamonds" by Rita Wilson
Cameo-oke: "Diamonds" by Rita Wilson
1,203	145	May 28, 2026	Brendan Fraser, David Tennant, Marin Alsop	N/A	"Day Late and a Buck Short" by Julia Cole
Cameo-oke: "Day Late and a Buck Short" by Julia Cole
1,204	146	May 29, 2026	Billy Eichner, Nicholas Christopher, Linda Perry, Leia Ham	Amble	"Feathers in a Storm" by Linda Perry
Cameo-oke: "Feathers in a Storm" by Linda Perry
1,205	147	June 1, 2026	Jonathan Scott, Drew Scott, Jessie Ware	Henry Lau	"Eat Me Alive" by Cami Petyn (Encore)
Guest host: Andy Cohen
1,206	148	June 2, 2026	Tina Fey, Will Forte, Erika Henningsen, Marco Calvani, Kerri Kenney-Silver	N/A	"Dare You to Move" by Switchfoot
1,207	149	June 3, 2026	Jason Derulo, Jo Dee Messina, Giuliana Rancic, Bill Rancic, Megan Hilty	Jason Derulo	"All Night Parking Interlude" by Adele (Encore)
1,208	150	June 4, 2026	Nicholas Galitzine, Camila Mendes, Jill Biden, Girl Named Tom	N/A	"The Sun" by Girl Named Tom
Cameo-oke: "The Sun" by Girl Named Tom
1,209	151	June 5, 2026	Jennifer Lopez, Brett Goldstein, Betty Gilpin, Tony Hale, Jim Curtis, Jon Bernthal	N/A	"Jesus Wept" by JW Griffin
Cameo-oke: "Jesus Wept" by JW Griffin
1,210	152	June 8, 2026	Alison Brie, Adewale Akinnuoye-Agbaje	N/A	"Hundred Mile High" by Cameron Whitcomb (Encore)
1,211	153	June 9, 2026	Amy Adams, Laverne Cox, Carnie Wilson, Micaela Erlanger, Carla Rockmore	N/A	"Becky's So Hot" by Fletcher (Encore)
1,212	154	June 10, 2026	Anna Faris, Samara Weaving, Nicholas Christopher, Jared Freid	Midland	"A Lot More Free" by Max McNown (Encore)
1,213	155	June 11, 2026	Lamorne Morris, Amy Grant	Train	"Til We Get It Right" by Amy Grant
Cameo-oke: "Til We Get It Right" by Amy Grant
1,214	156	June 12, 2026	Emily Blunt, Josh O'Connor, Avantika, David Nayfeld	N/A	"One More Night" by Phil Collins (Encore)
Guest host: Willie Geist
1,215	157	June 15, 2026	Bill Pullman	Des Rocs	"Bird Set Free" by Sia (Encore)
1,216	158	June 16, 2026	Bowen Yang, Matt Rogers, Belmont Cameli, Shaun T	N/A	"Suddenly Seymour" by Lee Wilkof & Ellen Greene
Kellyoke performed with Lawrence Zarian
1,217	159	June 17, 2026	Andie MacDowell, Eric Nam, Alex Guarnaschelli, Adam Richman	N/A	"It's Just Raining" by Avery Anna (Encore)
1,218	160	June 18, 2026	Judith Light, Chad Michael Murray, Prue Leith	N/A	"Here It Goes Again" by OK Go (Encore)
1,219	161	June 22, 2026	Richard Gadd, Frankie Grande, Nikki Hill, Claire Wadsworth	N/A	"The Sun Will Rise" by Kelly Clarkson (Encore)
1,220	162	June 23, 2026	Regina King, Logan Browning, Carley Fortune	PJ Morton	"Behind the Door" by Liv Ciara
Cameok-oke: "Behind the Door" by Liv Ciara
1,221	163	June 24, 2026	Molly Sims, William Stanford Davis, Golda Rosheuvel	The Band of Heathens	"Nothing Breaks Like a Heart" by Mark Ronson featuring Miley Cyrus (Encore)
Guest hosts: Tara Lipinski & Johnny Weir
1,222	164	June 25, 2026	Rob Lowe, Ella Hunt, Nadav Greenberg, Bryan Cranston, Jane Kaczmarek	N/A	"In My Life" by The Beatles
Cameo-oke: "In My Life" performed by Jessi Collins
1,223	165	June 29, 2026	Candiace Dillard Bassett, Rachel Feinstein, Elle Fanning	N/A	"Lesson in Leavin'" by Jo Dee Messina (Encore)
Guest hosts: Tara Lipinski & Johnny Weir
1,224	166	June 30, 2026	Zoey Deutch, Billy Eichner, Ellen Burstyn, Robert Smigel	Cassandra Coleman	"Big Time" by LP (Encore)
Guest host: Joel McHale
1,225	167	July 1, 2026	Millie Bobby Brown, Louis Partridge, Antonio Cipriano, Ashley McBryde	ATEEZ	"Lines in the Carpet" by Ashley McBryde
Cameo-oke: "Lines in the Carpet" by Ashley McBryde
1,226	168	July 13, 2026	Matt Cornett, Tina Fey, Will Forte, Erika Henningsen	Adam Lambert	"Cut!" by Maren Morris & Julia Michaels (Encore)
Guest host: Kerri Kenney-Silver
1,227	169	July 14, 2026	Mary J. Blige, Toni Braxton, Johnny Gill, Darlene Love, Arden Cho, Kal Penn, Mark Ronson, Amanda Seyfried	N/A	"Talking to the Moon" by Bruno Mars (Encore)
1,228	170	July 15, 2026	Jamie Lee Curtis, Josh Groban, Jo Koy, Gabriel Iglesias, Simon Baker	Waylon Wyatt	"In My Head" by Gryffin with Kaskade featuring Nu-La (Encore)
1,229	171	July 16, 2026	Octavia Spencer, Liza Colon-Zayas, Michael Bradway	N/A	"Cruel" by Kelly Clarkson (Encore)
Guest host: Joel McHale
1,230	172	July 20, 2026	Mason Gooding, Sandy Yawn, Kelsey Plum	Patrick Droney	"What This Could Be" by Joe Jonas (Encore)
1,231	173	July 21, 2026	Patricia Clarkson, Michael Vignola	JJerome87	"Austin" by Dasha (Encore)
Guest hosts: Mario Lopez, Courtney Lopez, Dominic Lopez
1,232	174	July 22, 2026	Billy Bob Thornton, Sterling K. Brown, Rhea Seehorn, Chelsea Handler, Retta, Jason Clarke, Cary Elwes	N/A	"Sweet Music Man" by Kenny Rogers (Encore)
Guest host: Andy Cohen
1,233	175	August 31, 2026	Kelly's children, River and Remy	N/A	TBA
Series finale, "By Request Hour": "Golden", "Since U Been Gone", "Sober", "Stronger (What Doesn't Kill You)", "Piece by Piece", "Didn't I", "I'd Be Lyin'"
