= The Kelly Clarkson Show season 5 =

US TV show (2023–2024)

The Kelly Clarkson Show
- Season 5
- Starring: Kelly Clarkson
- No. of episodes: 180

Release
- Original network: Syndication
- Original release: October 16, 2023 – August 12, 2024

Season chronology
- ← Previous; Season 4 Next → Season 6

The fifth season of The Kelly Clarkson Show began airing on October 16, 2023. Starting with this season, the show is filmed from the NBC Studios at 30 Rockefeller Plaza in New York City instead of Universal Studios in Los Angeles.

== Episodes ==
No. overall	No. in season	Original release date	Guest(s)	Musical/entertainment guest(s)	"Kellyoke" cover / "Kellyoke" Classic
703	1	October 16, 2023	Andy Cohen, Hoda Kotb, Jenna Bush Hager, Seth Meyers, Jane Krakowski	N/A	"I Won't Give Up" by Kelly Clarkson
704	2	October 17, 2023	Billy Porter, Eric Nam, Nick Offerman	Billy Porter	"Stronger (What Doesn't Kill You)" by Kelly Clarkson
"Stronger" performed with Billy Porter
705	3	October 18, 2023	Paul Shaffer, Arnold Schwarzenegger, Elmo, Oscar the Grouch, Lawrence Zarian	Enhypen	"New Attitude" by Patti LaBelle
706	4	October 19, 2023	Alanis Morissette	Alanis Morissette	"Smiling" by Alanis Morissette
Songs & Stories Hour
707	5	October 20, 2023	Bowen Yang, Emily Kaufman, Aliah Sheffield	N/A	"Crimson and Clover" by Tommy James and the Shondells
708	6	October 23, 2023	Darius Rucker, Nikki Glaser	Ava Paige	"Fighter" by Christina Aguilera
709	7	October 24, 2023	Sam Heughan, Jana Kramer	N/A	"When It Comes to You" by Cody Johnson
710	8	October 25, 2023	Eric McCormack, Jenna Lyons	Grace Potter	"Always In My Head" by Coldplay
711	9	October 26, 2023	Billy Ray Cyrus, Firerose, Sam Jay	Billy Ray Cyrus & Firerose	"Lucky Star" by Madonna
712	10	October 27, 2023	Josh Gad, Andrew Rannells, Nicole Avant	N/A	"1-2-3" by Gloria Estefan & Miami Sound Machine
713	11	October 30, 2023	Daniel Radcliffe, Jonathan Groff, Lindsay Mendez, Alix Earle	N/A	"Breakeven" by The Script
714	12	October 31, 2023	Kyle Richards, Keith Morrison, DC Young Fly	N/A	"vampire" by Olivia Rodrigo
Halloween Special
715	13	November 1, 2023	Jacob Elordi, chef José Andrés	N/A	"Tell It to My Heart" by Taylor Dayne
716	14	November 2, 2023	Ubah Hassan, Erin Lichy, Matt Rogers, Jeff Kinney	N/A	"Smile" by Nat King Cole
717	15	November 3, 2023	Meg Ryan, David Duchovny, Kat Graham	N/A	"Love, You Didn't Do Right By Me" by Rosemary Clooney
718	16	November 6, 2023	Jenna Bush Hager, Barbara Bush, Cailee Spaeny, Danielle Kartes	N/A	"Can I Stay" by Ray LaMontagne
719	17	November 7, 2023	A Place at the Table, Miami Children's Choir, Omaha Home for Boys, Forgotten Harvest, Firebird Arts, Families Forward, Sing for Seniors	N/A	"Mama, Dolly, Jesus" by Madeline Edwards
Good Neighbor of the Year Countdown
720	18	November 8, 2023	Taylor and Taylor Lautner, Alex Aster, Asi Wind	J. Brown	"Unwritten" by Natasha Bedingfield
721	19	November 9, 2023	Neil DeGrasse Tyson, Bernie Taupin	N/A	"Low" by Kelly Clarkson
722	20	November 10, 2023	Al Roker, Deborah Roberts, Matt Rife	Craig Morgan & Jelly Roll	"I'm Gonna Be (500 Miles)" by The Proclaimers
723	21	November 13, 2023	Leslie Jones, Ian Somerhalder	N/A	"Superstition" by Stevie Wonder
"Superstition" performed with Lacey Scaffer-Thomas
724	22	November 14, 2023	Jewel, Sheila E., Ashley Flowers, Jared Leto	N/A	"That's Right" by Kelly Clarkson featuring Sheila E.
725	23	November 15, 2023	Trace Lysette, Patricia Clarkson, Laverne Cox	N/A	"Watermelon Moonshine" by Lainey Wilson
726	24	November 16, 2023	Martha Stewart, Candace Parker, Bill Courtney	Smokie Norful	"Lighthouse" by Kelly Clarkson
727	25	November 17, 2023	Rachel Zegler, Hunter Schafer, Tom Blyth, Josh Andrés Rivera, Francis Lawrence, Nina Jacobson	N/A	"Nature Boy" by Nat King Cole
728	26	November 20, 2023	Garth Brooks	N/A	"I Get a Kick Out of You" by Cole Porter
729	27	November 21, 2023	Leslie Odom Jr., Mike Birbiglia, The Awesome Company	Leslie Odom Jr.	"Bonfire at Tina's" by Ashley McBryde
730	28	November 22, 2023	Taika Waititi, John O'Hurley, Jason Reynolds	N/A	"Down to You" by Kelly Clarkson
731	29	November 27, 2023	Kevin Bacon, Ego Nwodim	Kevin Quinn	"Like Eating Glass" by Bloc Party
732	30	November 28, 2023	Mark Harmon, Kel Mitchell	N/A	"Location" by Khalid
733	31	November 29, 2023	Paris Hilton, Please Don't Destroy, Marlo Thomas	N/A	"Daylight" by David Kushner
734	32	November 30, 2023	Jennifer Garner, Tony Gonzalez	Victory Brinker	"Missing You" by John Waite
735	33	December 1, 2023	Dionne Warwick, Damon Elliott, Mikey Day	N/A	"Desperado" by The Eagles
736	34	December 4, 2023	Brie Larson, Cash Warren, Alan Stuart, David Ehrenburg, Danielle Kartes	N/A	"Dear Insecurity" by Brandy Clark
"Dear Insecurity" performed with Brandy Clark
737	35	December 5, 2023	Annie Starke, Mario Lopez, Shane McAnally	The Cast of Shucked	"Never Too Much" by Luther Vandross
Broadway in 6A – Shucked
738	36	December 6, 2023	Sterling K. Brown, Kenan Thompson, Sean Paul	Manuel Turizo	"Vogue" by Madonna
739	37	December 7, 2023	Sara Bareilles, Pinky Cole	N/A	"Wildfire" by Cautious Clay
740	38	December 8, 2023	Jimmy Fallon, Meghan Trainor, Matt Bomer	Christina Perri	"Grown-Up Christmas List" by Amy Grant
741	39	December 11, 2023	Barry Manilow, Teddy Swims	N/A	"Glow" by Kelly Clarkson & Chris Stapleton
Holiday Show
742	40	December 12, 2023	Olivia Rodrigo, Maluma	N/A	"Wrapped in Red" by Kelly Clarkson
Holiday Show
743	41	December 13, 2023	Hannah Waddingham, Brie Bella & Nikki Garcia	Katie Kadan	"Christmas Eve" by Kelly Clarkson (second era)
Holiday Show
744	42	December 14, 2023	Taraji P. Henson	The Tenors	"4 Carats" by Kelly Clarkson
Holiday Show
745	43	December 15, 2023	Cher, Laila Lockhart, Big Time Rush	Big Time Rush	"Blue Christmas" by Elvis Presley
Holiday Show
746	44	December 18, 2023	Jason Momoa, Fantasia Barrino, Angela Cartwright	N/A	"O Holy Night"
Holiday Show
747	45	December 19, 2023	Sydney Sweeney, Da'Vine Joy Randolph	N/A	"DJ Play a Christmas Song" by Cher
Holiday Show
748	46	December 20, 2023	Shannen Doherty, Ariana Madix	Lauren Ash	"This Christmas" by Donny Hathaway
Holiday Show
749	47	December 21, 2023	Jeremy Allen White, Zac Efron, Harris Dickinson, Stanley Simons, Jazz House Kids, Ally Brooke, Dinah Jane	Ally Brooke & Dinah Jane	"Christmas in Sarajevo" by Savatage / Trans-Siberian Orchestra
Holiday Show
750	48	December 22, 2023	Danny DeVito, Lauren Daigle	Lauren Daigle	"Underneath the Tree" by Kelly Clarkson (third era)
Holiday Show; Good Neighbor of the Year finale
751	49	January 8, 2024	Natalie Portman	Megan Piphus & Bootsy Collins	"Eternal Flame" by The Bangles
752	50	January 9, 2024	Kelsey Grammer, Charles Melton, M.J. Acosta	N/A	"Tossed Salad and Scrambled Eggs" by Kelsey Grammer
"Tossed Salad and Scrambled Eggs" performed with Kelsey Grammer
753	51	January 10, 2024	Jon Cryer, Joe Keery, Danielle Kartes	N/A	"Used to Be Young" by Miley Cyrus
754	52	January 11, 2024	Lily James, Christopher Briney, Olivia Rodrigo	N/A	"Just Cause I Love You" by Avery Anna
755	53	January 12, 2024	Dan Levy, Coral Peña, Gesine Bullock-Prado	Wynonna Judd & Trisha Yearwood	"Trouble Blues" by Sam Cooke
756	54	January 15, 2024	Cynthia Erivo, Aml Ameen, Yolanda Renee King	Kings Return	"Pride (In the Name of Love)" by U2
Music as a Movement Hour
757	55	January 16, 2024	Michael Bublé, AleXa	AleXa	"Chains" by Tina Arena
758	56	January 17, 2024	Edgar Ramírez, Phoebe Dynevor, Danny DeVito	Victoria Justice & Toby Gad	"Riptide" by Vance Joy
759	57	January 18, 2024	Jamie Lee Curtis, Allison Holker	Black Pumas	"Don't Let Go (Love)" by En Vogue
760	58	January 19, 2024	Mateo, Jeffrey Wright, Matt Mathews, Michael Bublé	N/A	"My Way" by Frank Sinatra (second era)
761	59	January 22, 2024	Jodie Foster, Sherry Cola	Niko Moon	"Kids in America" by Kim Wilde
762	60	January 23, 2024	Common, Alaqua Cox, Lawrence Zarian	N/A	"Cure for Me" by Aurora
763	61	January 24, 2024	Sofía Vergara, Theresa Caputo	Say She She	"All the Man That I Need" by Whitney Houston
764	62	January 25, 2024	Chrissy Teigen, David Chang, Bianca Belair, Montez Ford	N/A	"Heaven" by Niall Horan
765	63	January 26, 2024	Jamie Oliver, Tom Hollander, Brittany Mahomes	N/A	"Mysterious Ways" by U2
766	64	January 29, 2024	Kevin James, Renata Notni	Charles Esten	"The Way It Is" by Bruce Hornsby and the Range
767	65	January 30, 2024	Justin Timberlake	BLKBOK	"Jaded" by Miley Cyrus
768	66	January 31, 2024	Daisy Ridley, Lisa Vanderpump, Hadley Vlahos	N/A	"Lost and Lookin'" by Sam Cooke
769	67	February 1, 2024	Bryce Dallas Howard, Catherine O'Hara, Desmond Meade	N/A	"Quietly Yours" by Birdy
Black History Month Kick-off
770	68	February 5, 2024	Dwyane Wade, Callum Turner, Jay Shetty, Lawrence Zarian	N/A	"Running with the Wolves" by Aurora
771	69	February 6, 2024	Kathryn Newton, Cole Sprouse, Diablo Cody, Zelda Williams, Sarah J. Maas	Kimberly Akimbo	"Comin' Home Baby" by Mel Tormé
772	70	February 7, 2024	Rob Gronkowski, Kali Reis, Sydney McLaughlin-Levrone	N/A	"Don't Worry Baby" by The Beach Boys
773	71	February 8, 2024	Rod Stewart, Jools Holland, Camila Mendes	N/A	"Blonde" by Dogstar
774	72	February 9, 2024	Sylvester Stallone, Nicola Peltz Beckham, Gloria Gaynor	N/A	"My Love Mine All Mine" by Mitski
775	73	February 12, 2024	Lester Holt, Lil Dicky, Breanna Stewart	N/A	"It Was a Sin" by The Revivalists
776	74	February 13, 2024	Isla Fisher, Justin Chien, Sam Song Li, Lawrence Zarian	Chloe Stroll	"Rock and a Hard Place" by Bailey Zimmerman
777	75	February 14, 2024	Justin Hartley, Zara Larsson	Il Divo	"L-O-V-E" by Nat King Cole
Valentine's Day
778	76	February 15, 2024	Donnie Wahlberg, Thalía, Emily Kaufman	N/A	"Save Me" by Jelly Roll feat. Lainey Wilson
779	77	February 16, 2024	Billy Dee Williams, Leo Woodall, Jessica Long, Taylor Dayne	N/A	"I'll Always Love You" by Taylor Dayne
"I'll Always Love You" performed with Taylor Dayne
780	78	February 19, 2024	Jennifer Lopez, Jeremiah Brent, Vince Staples	Mau y Ricky	"Let's Get Loud" by Jennifer Lopez
781	79	February 20, 2024	Amy Schumer, Sas Goldberg, Yamaneika Saunders, Arielle Siegel, Dale Earnhardt Jr., Ryan Blaney	N/A	"The Right Time" by Ray Charles
782	80	February 21, 2024	Hilary Swank	Jaime Wyatt	"I Was Wrong" by Chris Stapleton
783	81	February 22, 2024	Jenny Slate, Beanie Feldstein, Geraldine Viswanathan, Sabrina Elba, Karine Jean-Pierre	N/A	"Shelter" by Ray LaMontagne
784	82	February 23, 2024	Tyler Perry, Kelly Rowland, Trevante Rhodes, Ziggy Marley, Kingsley Ben-Adir	N/A	"I Can't Stand the Rain" by Ann Peebles
785	83	February 26, 2024	Savannah Guthrie, Donald Faison, Abigail Spencer, Affion Crockett	N/A	"Brighter Than Sunshine" by Aqualung
786	84	February 27, 2024	Danai Gurira, Kenneth Edmonds, Sean Wang	Dan + Shay	"Feather" by Sabrina Carpenter
787	85	February 28, 2024	Stephen Moyer, Duff Goldman	N/A	"When You Say Nothing at All" by Keith Whitley
788	86	February 29, 2024	Andy Cohen, Candiace Dillard Bassett, Wendy Osefo, Jamie Lee Curtis	N/A	"I Think We're Alone Now" by Tommy James and the Shondells (Tiffany version)
789	87	March 4, 2024	Joe Manganiello, Matt Iseman, Karen Huger	N/A	"Magic" by Kelly Clarkson
790	88	March 5, 2024	Hoda Kotb, Lainey Wilson	N/A	"Country's Cool Again" by Lainey Wilson
"Country's Cool Again" performed with Lainey Wilson
791	89	March 6, 2024	Millie Bobby Brown, Karamo Brown	AJR	"Carrying Your Love with Me" by George Strait
792	90	March 7, 2024	Annette Bening, DeWanda Wise, Pyper Braun, Holly Black	N/A	"Smell Like Smoke" by Lainey Wilson
793	91	March 8, 2024	New Kids on the Block	New Kids on the Block	"1985" by Bowling for Soup
Retro Campaign Kickoff
794	92	March 11, 2024	John Cena, Lindsay Lohan, Ayesha Curry, Ashley Tisdale	N/A	"Fighter" by Christina Aguilera (Encore)
795	93	March 12, 2024	Awkwafina, Chelsea Clinton, Victoria Garrick Browne, Ernie Hudson	Drake Milligan	"Favorite Kind of High" by Kelly Clarkson
796	94	March 13, 2024	Mike Tirico, Peyton Manning, Melissa Benoist, Lawrence Zarian	MAX & Huh Yunjin	"Dose" by Teddy Swims
797	95	March 14, 2024	Alison Brie, Rick Springfield, Richard Marx	N/A	"White Horse" by Chris Stapleton
798	96	March 15, 2024	Mark Wahlberg, Deion Sanders	Ruben Studdard	"Good Vibrations" by Marky Mark and the Funky Bunch
799	97	March 18, 2024	Jamie Dornan, Joey Graziadei	HunterGirl	"The Bones" by Maren Morris
800	98	March 19, 2024	Finn Wolfhard, Tom Colicchio, Gail Simmons, Kristen Kish, Steven R. Schirripa	Aoife O'Donovan	"Wide Awake" by Katy Perry
801	99	March 20, 2024	Kal Penn, Mckenna Grace	N/A	"Black Horse and the Cherry Tree" by KT Tunstall
802	100	March 21, 2024	Jake Gyllenhaal, Hannah Love Lanier	N/A	"Boondocks" by Little Big Town
803	101	March 22, 2024	William Shatner, Gary Clark Jr.	Gary Clark Jr.	"I Can't Stand the Rain" by Ann Peebles (Encore)
804	102	March 25, 2024	Willie Geist, Kiawentiio, Elizabeth Yu, Robyn Schall	N/A	"Beggin'" by The Four Seasons (Måneskin version)
805	103	March 26, 2024	Gisele Bündchen, Daniela Melchior, Chuck Scarborough	Back to the Future: The Musical	"Too Cool to Die" by Post Malone
806	104	March 27, 2024	Sara Gilbert, Arden Myrin, Mat Franco	Valerie June	"I Hate Love" by Kelly Clarkson feat. Steve Martin
807	105	March 28, 2024	Ricky Martin, Rebecca Hall	Paris Paloma	"What Was I Made For?" by Billie Eilish
808	106	March 29, 2024	Brian Tyree Henry, Mayan Lopez, Brittany Howard, Joslyn DeFreece	Mergui	"Stay High" by Brittany Howard
"Stay High" performed with Brittany Howard
809	107	April 1, 2024	Sheryl Crow, Heidi Gardner, Justin Willman, Anthony Madu, Matthew Ogens	Marcus King	"I Dare You" by Kelly Clarkson (second era)
810	108	April 2, 2024	Rebel Wilson, Tony Curran	ASD Band	"Somebody Like You" by Keith Urban
World Autism Awareness Day
811	109	April 3, 2024	Carol Burnett, Kristen Wiig, Delaney Rowe	Tomorrow X Together	"Die For You" by Joji
812	110	April 4, 2024	Valerie Bertinelli, Fortune Feimster, Henry Lloyd-Hughes	N/A	"Be Still" by Kelly Clarkson
813	111	April 5, 2024	Joey King, Logan Lerman, Kit Hoover, Triple H	Fletcher	"Over the Rainbow" by Judy Garland
814	112	April 8, 2024	Dev Patel, Nick Mohammed, Sue Bird	Maurette Brown Clark	"Edge of Midnight" by Miley Cyrus
815	113	April 9, 2024	Jenny McCarthy, Danielle Macdonald, Christina Tosi	N/A	"Me" by Kelly Clarkson
816	114	April 10, 2024	Julianne Moore, Billy Gardell	Morgxn	"Some Things I'll Never Know" by Teddy Swims
817	115	April 11, 2024	Kirsten Dunst, Rudy Mancuso	N/A	"Mind Your Own Business" by Hank Williams
818	116	April 12, 2024	Maren Morris, Karina Argow, Wagner Moura	N/A	"Ain't Nobody" by Rufus
819	117	April 15, 2024	Hillary Clinton, Shaina Taub	Shaina Taub	"Apologies" by Grace Potter and the Nocturnals
Broadway in 6A – Suffs
820	118	April 16, 2024	Nicole Richie, Ella Purnell, Alice Randall, Valerie June	N/A	"Get on Your Feet" by Gloria Estefan
821	119	April 17, 2024	Michael Douglas, Sunny Choi, Victor Montalvo	ERNEST	"Invincible" by Kelly Clarkson
822	120	April 18, 2024	Henry Golding	Tyler Hubbard	"Remember Me" by Coco
823	121	April 19, 2024	John Lithgow, Cary Elwes, Kwame Alexander	Parmalee	"Used to Be Young" by Miley Cyrus (Encore)
824	122	April 22, 2024	Tracy Morgan, Hiroyuki Sanada, Anna Sawai, Kwane Stewart	N/A	"Why Don't We Just Dance" by Josh Turner
825	123	April 23, 2024	Marcia Gay Harden, John Bradley, Michael Ruhlman	N/A	"It Was Almost Like a Song" by Ronnie Milsap
826	124	April 24, 2024	Heart	Heart	"Can't Catch Me Now" by Olivia Rodrigo
Kelly's Birthday; Songs & Stories Hour
827	125	April 25, 2024	Zendaya, Ingrid Michaelson, Joy Woods	Joy Woods	"Get Yourself Another Fool" by Sam Cooke
Broadway in 6A – The Notebook
828	126	April 26, 2024	Christian Slater, Evan Funke, Olly Alexander	Brittney Spencer	"The Heart of the Matter" by Don Henley
829	127	April 29, 2024	Meghan Trainor, Fred Richard, Jillian Michaels	MacKenzie Porter	"All About That Bass" by Meghan Trainor
"All About That Bass" performed with Meghan Trainor
830	128	April 30, 2024	Anne Hathaway, Amber Ruffin, Sam Neill	N/A	"Chemical" by Post Malone
831	129	May 1, 2024	Jim Gaffigan, Justice Smith, Jennifer Garner	Scotty McCreery	"Till You Love Me" by Reba McEntire
832	130	May 2, 2024	Jean Smart, Nicholas Galitzine	N/A	"Fix You" by Coldplay
833	131	May 3, 2024	Jerry Seinfeld, Henry Hall, Nick Fradiani	Maddie Zahm	"Let Him Fly" by Patty Griffin
834	132	May 6, 2024	Jeff Daniels, Hannah Einbinder, John Green, Hannah Marks, Seth Rogen, Lauren Miller Rogen	N/A	"Sad but True" by Metallica
835	133	May 7, 2024	Zayn Malik, Craig Melvin, Luke Hemmings	N/A	"Two Story House" by Lainey Wilson
836	134	May 8, 2024	Emily Blunt, Willow Smith, Questlove, Emily Kaufman	N/A	"Behind These Hazel Eyes" by Kelly Clarkson
837	135	May 9, 2024	Riley Keough, Luis A. Miranda Jr.	Andra Day	"She's Not the Cheatin' Kind" by Brooks & Dunn
838	136	May 10, 2024	Tiffany Haddish, Freya Allan, Cleo Wade	Alec Benjamin	"Beggin for Thread" by Banks
839	137	May 13, 2024	Whoopi Goldberg, Melanie Lynskey, Jen Psaki	N/A	"Better Place" by NSYNC
840	138	May 14, 2024	Chris Pine, Rita Ora	Brynn Cartelli	"Cry" by Kelly Clarkson
841	139	May 15, 2024	Brooke Shields, Weezer	N/A	"Say It Ain't So" by Weezer
"Say It Ain't So" performed with Weezer
842	140	May 16, 2024	J.K. Simmons, Michelle Schumacher, Olivia Simmons, Joe Simmons, Marisa Abela	N/A	"bad idea right?" by Olivia Rodrigo
843	141	May 17, 2024	Sandra Oh, Bailee Madison, Adeline Gray	N/A	"Not Today" by Kelly Clarkson
844	142	May 20, 2024	Shay Mitchell, Lili Taylor	James Arthur	"Something Real" by Post Malone
"The Gift of Being Different" by James Arthur & Kelly Clarkson
845	143	May 21, 2024	Olivia Munn, Kim Raver	N/A	"You Love Who You Love" by Zara Larsson
846	144	May 22, 2024	Simu Liu, Luke Newton, Jeffrey Wright	Stray Kids	"Addicted" by Kelly Clarkson
847	145	May 23, 2024	Glen Powell, Ally Maki	N/A	"Breakeven" by The Script (Encore)
848	146	May 24, 2024	Anya Taylor-Joy, Chris Hemsworth, Lee Jung-jae, Christina Applegate, Jamie-Lynn Sigler	N/A	"Bloom" by Aqyila
849	147	May 28, 2024	Ben Platt, Rachel Feinstein, Asher HaVon	N/A	"Make You Feel My Love" by Bob Dylan (Encore)
"Make You Feel My Love" performed with Ben Platt
850	148	May 29, 2024	Patti LaBelle, Manuel Turizo, Dawn Russell, Julian Works	N/A	"On My Own" by Patti LaBelle & Michael McDonald (Reba McEntire version)
"On My Own" performed with Patti LaBelle
851	149	May 30, 2024	Jeremy Renner, Lauren Ash, Chuck Aoki, Chris Pratt	Jasmine Cephas Jones	"Whyyawannabringmedown" by Kelly Clarkson
852	150	May 31, 2024	Alicia Keys, Michael McDonald, Paul Reiser, Vox Realis	Cast of Hell's Kitchen	"Come Rain or Come Shine" by Johnny Mercer
Broadway in 6A – Hell's Kitchen
853	151	June 3, 2024	Ed O'Neill, Shaboozey, Matthew Rodrigues, Zoya Biglary, Jamie Kern Lima	Shaboozey	"Becky's So Hot" by Fletcher
854	152	June 4, 2024	Drew Scott, Jonathan Silver Scott, Kristin Juszczyk, Ezra Frech	Infinity Song	"Beautiful Disaster" by Kelly Clarkson
855	153	June 5, 2024	Will Smith, Martin Lawrence, Dakota Fanning, Matt Iseman, James Patterson, Paula Cole, Sherri Alexander	N/A	"I Will Wait" by Mumford & Sons
856	154	June 6, 2024	Jon Bon Jovi, Jennifer Esposito	The Outsiders	"Blaze of Glory" by Jon Bon Jovi
857	155	June 10, 2024	Eddie Redmayne, Gayle Rankin, Retta, Ricky Martin	Ateez	"Big Time" by Peter Gabriel
858	156	June 11, 2024	Amy Poehler, Gottmik, Nina West, Vanessa Vanjie Mateo	Shaed	"Beautiful Things" by Benson Boone
859	157	June 12, 2024	Marlon Wayans, Griffin Dunne, CeCe Winans	CeCe Winans	"Island" by Tony K
860	158	June 13, 2024	Theo James, Carly Pearce	Carly Pearce	"Have Mercy" by The Judds
861	159	June 17, 2024	Kenny Chesney, Chip Gaines, Joanna Gaines, Kwame Onwuachi	N/A	"At Your Worst" by Calum Scott
862	160	June 18, 2024	Ron Howard, Cheryl Henson, Tyla, Mr. Ty	Angus & Julia Stone	"Tin Man" by Miranda Lambert
863	161	June 19, 2024	Aisha Tyler, Jo Koy	Lalah Hathaway	"Trouble Blues" by Sam Cooke (Encore)
864	162	June 20, 2024	Ava DuVernay, Lawrence Zarian, Zayn Malik	Wrabel	"You're Still the One" by Shania Twain
865	163	June 21, 2024	Austin Butler, Jodie Comer, Melissa Rivers, Emily Kaufman	Wade Bowen	"Flowers" by Miley Cyrus
866	164	June 24, 2024	Kevin Costner, Lily Gladstone, Erica Tremblay, Isabel Deroy-Olson	N/A	"Sold" by John Michael Montgomery
867	165	June 25, 2024	Joseph Gordon-Levitt, Yamaneika Saunders, June Squibb, Bill Rancic	N/A	"Bird Set Free" by Sia
868	166	June 26, 2024	Lupita Nyong'o, Joseph Quinn, Laufey	Laufey	"One More Night" by Phil Collins
869	167	June 27, 2024	Eddie Murphy, Abby Elliott, Savannah Bananas, Miranda Cosgrove	Alisa Amador	"All Night Parking Interlude" by Adele
870	168	July 8, 2024	Channing Tatum, Elizabeth Debicki, Paul de Gelder	N/A	"Wild" by John Legend feat. Gary Clark Jr.
871	169	July 9, 2024	Kelsey Grammer, Kevin James, Sara Gilbert, Dan Levy, Jon Cryer, Sofia Vergara	N/A	"Tossed Salad and Scrambled Eggs" by Kelsey Grammer (Encore)
Sitcom Superstars
872	170	July 10, 2024	Vanessa Williams, Maria Taylor, Alex Wolff, Norah Jones	N/A	"Angel" by Aerosmith
873	171	July 11, 2024	Scarlett Johansson, Lester Holt, Trixie Mattel	N/A	"Babylon" by David Gray
874	172	July 15, 2024	Justin Timberlake, New Kids on the Block, Donnie Wahlberg, Mark Wahlberg, Ricky Martin, Big Time Rush	N/A	"Good Vibrations" by Marky Mark and The Funky Bunch (Encore)
Best of Boy Bands Hour
875	173	July 16, 2024	Viggo Mortensen, Vicky Krieps, Lawrence Zarian, Brody Malone, Pepe Aguilar	Pepe Aguilar	"I Left My Heart in San Francisco" by Tony Bennett
876	174	July 17, 2024	Colman Domingo, Noah Lyles	UB40	"Baby Baby" by Amy Grant
877	175	July 18, 2024	Matthew Macfadyen, Ariana Greenblatt, Lawrence Zarian, Evita Griskenas	Travis	"Nothing Matters" by The Last Dinner Party
878	176	July 22, 2024	Terry Crews, Maria Taylor, Asher Grodman	N/A	"She's on My Mind" by Romy
Countdown to Paris
879	177	July 23, 2024	Harry Connick Jr., Gracie Abrams, Lawrence Zarian, Lee Kiefer, Gerek Meinhardt, LaDarrion Williams	Gracie Abrams	"Running with the Wolves" by Aurora (Encore)
Countdown to Paris
880	178	July 24, 2024	Peyton Manning, Mike Tirico, Jessica Long, Fred Richard, Breanna Stewart, Lawrence Zarian	N/A	"Invincible" by Kelly Clarkson (Encore)
Countdown to Paris Repack
881	179	July 25, 2024	Cyndi Lauper, Laurie Hernandez, Mary Lou Retton, Lawrence Zarian	Collective Soul	"Blown Away" by Carrie Underwood
Countdown to Paris
882	180	August 12, 2024	Kwane Stewart	N/A	"Stronger (What Doesn't Kill You)" by Kelly Clarkson (Encore)
Real American Heroes Hour
