= The Kelly Clarkson Show season 6 =

US TV show (2024–2025)

The Kelly Clarkson Show
- Season 6
- Starring: Kelly Clarkson
- No. of episodes: 176

Release
- Original network: Syndication
- Original release: September 23, 2024 – June 25, 2025

Season chronology
- ← Previous; Season 5 Next → Season 7

The sixth season of The Kelly Clarkson Show began airing on September 23, 2024.

== Notes ==
Kelly Clarkson was out sick for the October 1 and 4, 2024, episodes, and had guest hosts Michael Bublé and Roy Wood Jr. filling in, respectively.

- On October 1, 2024, Bublé performed the Kellyoke song "Lovin', Touchin', Squeezin'’" by Journey. This is the second time that a guest host performed at the start of the show for a Kellyoke cover.
- Wood Jr. returned as guest host on February 28 and March 6, 2025.
- Simu Liu guest hosted on March 3, 2025.
- Wanda Sykes and Josh Groban co-guest hosted on March 7, 2025, which marked the first time in the show's history there had been two guest co-hosts.
- Brooke Shields guest hosted on March 10–11, 2025.
- Willie Geist guest hosted on March 12, 2025.
- Molly Sims guest hosted on March 13–14, 2025.
- Kal Penn guest hosted on March 17 and April 1, 2025.
- Andy Cohen guest hosted on March 19 and April 21, 2025.

== Cameo-oke ==
Starting this season there is a new Cameo-oke feature on the show where guest singers sing the Kelly-oke instead of Kelly. These singers include: Gavin DeGraw, Allen Stone, Kristin Chenoweth, Clay Aiken, Jonathan McReynolds, Chicago, Josh Groban, Smokey Robinson, Marc Broussard, Corey Glover, Gracie Lawrence, Rachel Platten, Abby Romeo, Amy Grant, Dove Cameron, Ledisi, Aly & AJ, and Lea Michele.

== Episodes ==
No. overall	No. in season	Original release date	Guest(s)	Musical/entertainment guest(s)	"Kellyoke" cover / "Kellyoke" Classic
883	1	September 23, 2024	Halle Berry, Anthony B. Jenkins, Percy Daggs IV, Kelsey Grammer	Lawrence	Kelly Clarkson Dance Medley
30 Rock Roof Party; Kelly Clarkson Dance Medley: "Dance With Me" / "Favorite Kind of High" / "People Like Us" / "Stronger (What Doesn't Kill You)" by Kelly Clarkson
884	2	September 24, 2024	Miranda Lambert	Miranda Lambert	"No Man's Land" by Miranda Lambert
30 Rock Roof Party; Songs & Stories Hour; "No Man's Land" performed with Miranda Lambert
885	3	September 25, 2024	Colin Farrell, Questlove, Melanie Zanetti, Hugh Evans	N/A	"Coffee" by Chappell Roan
886	4	September 26, 2024	Keith Urban, Cristin Milioti	Keith Urban	"Messed Up As Me" by Keith Urban
"Messed Up As Me" was only performed by Keith Urban
887	5	September 27, 2024	Kate Winslet, Nathalie Emmanuel	N/A	"My Heart Will Go On" by Celine Dion
888	6	September 30, 2024	Lily Collins, Ashley Park, Philippine Leroy-Beaulieu, Amy Yasbeck, Jason Ritter	Brigitte Calls Me Baby	"Blues in the Night" by Eva Cassidy
889	7	October 1, 2024	Roy Wood Jr., Cooper Koch, Jade Iovine	N/A	"Lovin', Touchin', Squeezin'" by Journey
Guest host Justin Steinbeck
890	8	October 2, 2024	Kate McKinnon, Keith Urban, Danielle Kartes	MJ The Musical	"What Was I Made For?" by Billie Eilish (Encore)
891	9	October 3, 2024	Helen Mirren, Adam Lambert, Jennifer Garner	Lake Street Dive	"Ain't Nobody " by Chaka Khan (Encore)
892	10	October 4, 2024	Kristen Bell, Adam Brody, Leanne Morgan, Andrew Zimmern	N/A	"New Attitude" by Patti LaBelle (Encore)
Guest host Michael Fish
893	11	October 7, 2024	Zachary Quinto, Ms. Pat, Will Reeve, Matthew Reeve, Alexandra Reeve, Flying Fish Family	N/A	"The Middle" by Zedd, Maren Morris & Grey
894	12	October 8, 2024	Ciara, Lucas Bravo, Shin Lim, Mother Pigeon	Hurray for the Riff Raff	"Building a Mystery" by Sarah McLachlan
895	13	October 9, 2024	Sarah Paulson, Teddy Swims, Queen of BookTok	N/A	"Eras of Us" by Fletcher
896	14	October 10, 2024	Ali Wong, Lamorne Morris, Finneas	Finneas	"The Promise" by When in Rome
897	15	October 11, 2024	Cate Blanchett, Ella Hunt, Funny Girls Leadership, Rupi Kaur	Raye	"My Kink Is Karma" by Chappell Roan
International Day of the Girl
898	16	October 14, 2024	Anna Kendrick, Kathryn Gallagher, Autumn Best, Keith Morrison, Andrea Canning	Larry Fleet	"Maybe I'm Amazed" by Paul McCartney and Wings
"Maybe I'm Amazed" performed by Cameo-oke guest Gavin DeGraw
899	17	October 15, 2024	Trevor Noah, Taylor Tomlinson, Josh Mankiewicz, Blayne Alexander, Brittany Snow, Jaspre Guest	N/A	"Breakup Over Breakfast" by Avery Anna
900	18	October 16, 2024	Laura Dern, Liam Hemsworth, Jelly Roll, Gloria Estefan, Kate McKinnon	N/A	"I Am Not Okay" by Jelly Roll
"I Am Not Okay" performed with Jelly Roll
901	19	October 17, 2024	Stanley Tucci, Maria Becerra	Maria Becerra	"Slow It Down" by Benson Boone
902	20	October 18, 2024	Chris Martin, David Boreanaz, Warren Zeiders	Warren Zeiders	"All My Love" by Coldplay
"All My Love" performed with Chris Martin
903	21	October 21, 2024	Uma Thurman	Samara Joy	"That's Life" by Marion Montgomery
904	22	October 22, 2024	Snoop Dogg, Kylie Minogue, Jeff Kinney, Gaia Wise	N/A	"All the Stars" by Kendrick Lamar & SZA
905	23	October 23, 2024	Melissa McCarthy, Ben Falcone, Josh Rivera, Toks Olagundoye, Eitan Levine	Katseye	"When My Fingers Find Your Strings" by Jeff Daniels
906	24	October 24, 2024	Lin-Manuel Miranda, Eisa Davis, Raye, Bethany Joy Lenz, Danielle Kartes	The Cactus Blossoms	"Sweet Music Man" by Kenny Rogers
907	25	October 25, 2024	Seth Meyers, Bridget Everett, Drake White	Brantley Gilbert & Ashley Cooke	"Ain't That Lonely Yet" by Dwight Yoakam
908	26	October 28, 2024	Al Roker, Courtney Roker Laga, Shanola Hampton, Jill Martin	N/A	"Come Together" by The Beatles
909	27	October 29, 2024	Terry Bradshaw, DeWanda Wise, Curtis Stone, Penn Holderness	Grace Bowers	"I Will Wait" by Mumford & Sons (Encore)
910	28	October 30, 2024	Jesse Eisenberg, Melissa Gilbert, Jenny Martinez	Jordan Davis	"It's Just Raining" by Avery Anna
911	29	October 31, 2024	Reba McEntire, Rex Linn, Melissa McCarthy, Ben Falcone	The Boulet Brothers	"Day-O (The Banana Boat Song)" by Harry Belafonte
Halloween Hour
912	30	November 1, 2024	Eva Longoria, Isabella Rossellini, James Morosini	Allen Stone & Sarah Kinsley	"Is This Love" by Bob Marley and the Wailers
"Is This Love" performed by Cameo-oke guest Allen Stone
913	31	November 4, 2024	Robin Wright, Kelsea Ballerini	Kelsea Ballerini	"All of Me"
914	32	November 7, 2024	Rita Wilson, Rosemarie DeWitt, Judy Greer, Pete Holmes	Tank and the Bangas	"You Lie" by Cee Cee Chapman (Reba McEntire version)
915	33	November 8, 2024	Julianna Margulies, Megan Hilty, Dominique Ansel	The Heavy Heavy	"Roll Me Up and Smoke Me When I Die" by Willie Nelson feat. Snoop Dogg, Kris Kristofferson & Jamey Johnson
916	34	November 11, 2024	Steve Martin, Alison Brown, Jon Batiste	Steve Martin, Alison Brown & Vince Gill	"The Promise" by When in Rome (Encore)
Veteran's Day Hour
917	35	November 12, 2024	Jim Parsons, Zoey Deutch, Ephraim Sykes, Connie Chung	N/A	"Walk Like an Egyptian" by The Bangles
918	36	November 13, 2024	Shailene Woodley, Betty Gilpin, Lisa Taddeo, Sarah Paulson	N/A	"Please Please Please" by Sabrina Carpenter
919	37	November 14, 2024	Hugh Grant, Gizelle Bryant	N/A	"Always Remember Us This Way" by Lady Gaga
920	38	November 15, 2024	Dwayne Johnson, Chris Evans, Lucy Liu, J.K. Simmons, Bonnie Hunt, Kiernan Shipka	N/A	"What's Left of Me" by Grace VanderWaal
921	39	November 18, 2024	Kristin Chenoweth, Aldis Hodge, Alex Aster	Kristin Chenoweth	"I Will Always Love You" by Dolly Parton
"I Will Always Love You" performed by Cameo-oke guest Kristin Chenoweth
922	40	November 19, 2024	Ariana Grande, Cynthia Erivo, Jeff Goldblum, Jonathan Bailey, Marissa Bode	N/A	"If I Only Had a Brain"
Wicked hour
923	41	November 20, 2024	Josh Brolin, Melissa Rauch, John O'Hurley	N/A	"All By Myself" by Eric Carmen (Celine Dion version)
924	42	November 21, 2024	Nicole Scherzinger, Helen J Shen	N/A	"Ain't No Love in Oklahoma" by Luke Combs
925	43	November 22, 2024	Paul Mescal, Connie Nielsen, Bozoma Saint John, The Star Choir	Yola	"Laredo" by Leon Bridges
926	44	November 25, 2024	Bowen Yang, Auli'i Cravalho, Will Butler, Lawrence Zarian	Stereophonic	"Pink Pony Club" by Chappell Roan
927	45	November 26, 2024	Kaley Cuoco, Xolo Maridueña	N/A	"Lavender Haze" by Taylor Swift
928	46	November 27, 2024	Michelle Williams, Sebastián Yatra	Chase Rice	"The Sun Will Rise" by Kelly Clarkson
929	47	December 2, 2024	Jon Hamm, Billy Bob Thornton, Ali Larter, Jack Huston, Jennifer Love Hewitt	N/A	"Don't You Wanna Stay" by Jason Aldean & Kelly Clarkson
930	48	December 3, 2024	Cher, Dave Annable	Hollow Coves	"All the Stars" by Kendrick Lamar & SZA (Encore)
931	49	December 4, 2024	Jeffrey Wright, Fortune Feimster	N/A	"Not That I Care" by Willie Nelson
932	50	December 5, 2024	N/A	N/A	"Steppin'n On Me" by Fitz and The Tantrums
Good Neighbor of the Year Hour
933	51	December 6, 2024	Taye Diggs, Tyler Posey, Ari Graynor, Robert Hartwell, Alvin Ailey American Dance Theater	Alvin Ailey American Dance Theater	"Moves" by Suki Waterhouse
934	52	December 9, 2024	Keith Urban	Keith Urban	"Have Yourself a Merry Little Christmas" by Judy Garland (Second era)
Keith and Kelly perform his song "Go Home W U"
935	53	December 10, 2024	Stephanie Hsu, Ethan Slater	Ben Folds	"Underneath the Tree" by Kelly Clarkson (Fourth era)
936	54	December 11, 2024	50 Cent, Suki Waterhouse	Suki Waterhouse	"Sleigh Ride" by Kelly Clarkson
937	55	December 12, 2024	Taron Egerton, Simone Biles, the cast of Death Becomes Her	N/A	"You for Christmas" by Kelly Clarkson
938	56	December 13, 2024	Eddie Redmayne, Queer Eye Fab 5	N/A	"Run Rudolph Run" by Chuck Berry (Second era)
939	57	December 16, 2024	Elle Fanning, Clay Aiken, Sofronio Vasquez	Muni Long	"Do You Hear What I Hear?" by Harry Simeone Chorale
"Do You Hear What I Hear" performed by Cameo-oke guest Clay Aiken
940	58	December 17, 2024	Common, Pete Rock, Brett Eldredge	N/A	"Sweet December" by Brett Eldredge & Kelly Clarkson
Kellyoke performed with Brett Eldredge
941	59	December 18, 2024	Lisa Kudrow, Ray Romano, Rhenzy Feliz, Eddie Redmayne	N/A	"Christmas Eve" by Kelly Clarkson (Third era)
942	60	December 19, 2024	Michael Fassbender, Aaron Pierre, Tiffany Boone, Kelvin Harrison Jr.	N/A	"White Christmas" by Jonathan McReynolds
"White Christmas" performed by Cameo-oke guest Jonathan McReynolds
943	61	December 20, 2024	Billy Eichner, Lily-Rose Depp	N/A	"Santa, Can't You Hear Me" by Kelly Clarkson & Ariana Grande (Second era)
Good Neighbor of the Year finale
944	62	January 6, 2025	Hoda Kotb, Jharrel Jerome	N/A	"Dancing on Glass" by St. Lucia
945	63	January 7, 2025	Jim Gaffigan, Rosé	N/A	"Too Sweet" by Hozier
946	64	January 8, 2025	Taylor Kitsch, Mel Robbins, The Phoenix, Kelly's kids: River & Remy	N/A	"Sick" by Dominic Fike
947	65	January 9, 2025	Adrien Brody, Snoop Dogg	Lee DeWyze	"Eras of Us" by Fletcher (Encore)
948	66	January 10, 2025	Chelsea Handler, Clarence Maclin	Drew & Ellie Holcomb	"Stranger in My House" by Tamia
949	67	January 13, 2025	N/A	N/A	"Hear Me" by Kelly Clarkson
What I'm Loving Hour; "Hear Me" performed with Vox Realis
950	68	January 14, 2025	Denis Leary, Kelsey Asbille	N/A	"Love Out of Lust" by Lykke Li
951	69	January 15, 2025	Brooke Shields, Lee Jung-jae, Lee Byung-hun, Sofi Tukker	Sofi Tukker	"Blue Ain't Your Color" by Keith Urban
952	70	January 16, 2025	Josh Gad, Gwendoline Christie	OK Go	"Red Wine Supernova" by Chappell Roan
953	71	January 17, 2025	Joel McHale, Amber Ruffin, Frank DeCaro	N/A	"Slow It Down" by Benson Boone (Encore)
954	72	January 21, 2025	Patricia Arquette, Sam Morril, Anna Kendrick	Mallrat	"Just Can't Get Enough" by Depeche Mode
955	73	January 22, 2025	Keke Palmer, Larry Mullen Jr., Matt Iseman	N/A	"Doesn't Do Me Any Good" by Stephen Sanchez
956	74	January 23, 2025	Naomi Watts, Lauren Alaina	Pom Pom Squad	"Kiss Me" by Sixpence None the Richer
957	75	January 24, 2025	Michelle Yeoh, Boyd Holbrook, Chicago	Chicago	"Saturday in the Park" by Chicago
"Saturday in the Park" performed by Cameo-oke guest Chicago
958	76	January 27, 2025	Sam Heughan, Julia Michaels, Matt Iseman, Charles Esten	N/A	"Better Be Tough" by Ella Langley
959	77	January 28, 2025	Jenna Bush Hager, Anna Cathcart	N/A	"Breakup Over Breakfast" by Avery Anna (Encore)
960	78	January 29, 2025	Sterling K. Brown, Carrie Preston, Ryan Day, Adam Lambert	N/A	"Birds of a Feather" by Billie Eilish
961	79	January 30, 2025	Will Ferrell, Reese Witherspoon, Meredith Hagner, Geraldine Viswanathan	The Warning	"More Than Words" by Extreme
962	80	January 31, 2025	Teddy Swims, Jessica Seinfeld	Teddy Swims	"A Lot More Free" by Max McNown
963	81	February 3, 2025	Gabriel Basso, Ashley Tisdale	N/A	"Flagpole Sitta" by Harvey Danger
964	82	February 4, 2025	Lauren Graham, Mason Gooding	N/A	"I Will (When You Do)" by Avery Anna feat. Dylan Marlowe
965	83	February 5, 2025	Amy Schumer, Jillian Bell, Brianne Howey, David Kwong	N/A	"Slow Dance" by Kelly Clarkson
966	84	February 6, 2025	James Marsden, Laverne Cox, Fortune Feimster	N/A	"The War Is Over" by Kelly Clarkson
967	85	February 7, 2025	Damon Wayans Jr., Olivia Holt, David Boreanaz, Matt Iseman	N/A	"A Long December" by Counting Crows
968	86	February 10, 2025	Anthony Mackie, Alan Cumming, Chef Scott	Ben Barnes	"Broken & Beautiful" by Kelly Clarkson
969	87	February 11, 2025	John Larroquette, Kane Brown	N/A	"You Can't Win" by Kelly Clarkson
970	88	February 12, 2025	Morris Chestnut, Jennifer Simard, Jessie Diggins	N/A	"Worst Way" by Riley Green
971	89	February 13, 2025	Christina Ricci, Danny Ramirez, Harlem Ice, Naomi Watts	N/A	"Another Love" by Tom Odell
972	90	February 14, 2025	Renee Zellweger, Chiwetel Ejiofor, Leo Woodall	Mariah. & Raheem DeVaughn	"Your Love" by The Outfield
Valentine’s Day
973	91	February 17, 2025	John Legend, Matt Iseman, Big Sean	N/A	"Heat" by Kelly Clarkson
974	92	February 18, 2025	Christian Slater, Amber Ruffin, Lawrence Zarian	N/A	"I Lied, I'm Sorry" by Chloe Qisha
975	93	February 19, 2025	Daisy Ridley, Alex Cooper	Sam Barber featuring Avery Anna	"Alright" by Supergrass
976	94	February 20, 2025	Julia Stiles, Reid Scott	Billianne	"Miss Me Too" by Griff
977	95	February 21, 2025	Trisha Yearwood, Alessia Cara	Trisha Yearwood	"Did You Know" by Kelly Clarkson
978	96	February 24, 2025	Andy Cohen, Kate Winslet	Max McNown	"What's Up Lonely" by Kelly Clarkson
979	97	February 25, 2025	Justin Hartley, Vanessa Lachey, Nick Lachey	Step Afrika!	"Standing in Front of You" by Kelly Clarkson
980	98	February 26, 2025	Savannah Guthrie, Mark-Paul Gosselaar	St. Lucia	"Letting Go" by Angie McMahon
981	99	February 27, 2025	Kate Hudson, Stephen Amell, Kate Walsh, Jeff Kinney	Babymonster	"Please Please Please" by Sabrina Carpenter (Encore)
982	100	February 28, 2025	Vincent D'Onofrio, Guy Fieri, Jim Gaffigan	Alessia Cara	"Steppin' On Me" by Fitz & The Tantrums (Encore)
Guest host Justin Steinbeck
983	101	March 3, 2025	Woody Harrelson, Finn Cole, Brenda Song	N/A	"Laredo" by Leon Bridges (Encore)
Guest host Justin Steinbeck
984	102	March 4, 2025	Noah Wyle, Patrick Gibson	Marc Broussard	"Goodbye" by Kelly Clarkson
985	103	March 5, 2025	Jason Derulo, Nora Fatehi, Jason Isaacs	Allie X	"Moves" by Suki Waterhouse (Encore)
986	104	March 6, 2025	Michael Strahan, Denise Richards, Lola Sheen, Brad Meltzer, Jack Wallace	N/A	"Pink Pony Club" by Chappell Roan (Encore)
Guest host Michael Fish
987	105	March 7, 2025	Kevin Hart	N/A	"Over the Rainbow" by Judy Garland
Guest host Justin Steinbeck "Over the Rainbow" performed by Cameo-oke guest Josh Groban
988	106	March 10, 2025	Smokey Robinson, Simone Ashley, Hero Fiennes Tiffin, Dr. Sandra Lee, Christian Slater, Liv Morgan	Smokey Robinson	"Be Thankful for What You Got" by William DeVaughn
Guest host Justin Steinbeck; "Be Thankful for What You Got" performed by Cameo-oke guest Smokey Robinson
989	107	March 11, 2025	Joshua Jackson, Eiza González, Asif Ali	Kip Moore	"Too Sweet" by Hozier (Encore)
Guest host Justin Steinbeck
990	108	March 12, 2025	Michael Fassbender, Regé-Jean Page, The Traitors winner	The cast of Gypsy	"Cry to Me" by Solomon Burke
Guest host Justin Steinbeck; "Cry to Me" performed by Cameo-oke guest Marc Broussard
991	109	March 13, 2025	Patrick Schwarzenegger, Bryan Greenberg, Lauren Graham	N/A	"Just Can't Get Enough" by Depeche Mode (Encore)
Guest host Michael Fish
992	110	March 14, 2025	Amanda Seyfried, Nicholas Pinnock	Sir Woman	"Dancing on Glass" by St. Lucia (Encore)
Guest host Michael Fish
993	111	March 17, 2025	Stanley Tucci, Iliza Shlesinger, Denis Leary, Jesse L. Martin	N/A	"Cult of Personality" by Living Colour
St. Patrick’s Day; Guest host Michael Fish; "Cult of Personality" performed by Cameo-oke guest Corey Glover of Living Colour.
994	112	March 18, 2025	Adam Scott, Marc Rebillet, Long Island Bombers Beep Baseball	N/A	"Flames" by Will Swinton
995	113	March 19, 2025	Chrissy Teigen, Anthony Michael Hall	Andy Cohen	"Since U Been Gone" by Kelly Clarkson
Guest host Andy Cohen; "Since U Been Gone" performed by Cameo-oke guest Andy Cohen
996	114	March 20, 2025	Tyler Perry, Alicia Vikander, Mau y Ricky	Mau y Ricky	"I Have Nothing" by Whitney Houston
1,000th episode celebration
997	115	March 21, 2025	Ellen Pompeo, David Blaine, Crystle Stewart, Melissa Peterman	N/A	"Hello" by Kelly Clarkson
998	116	March 24, 2025	Joe Manganiello, Matt Iseman, Andrew Burnap, Barbie Ferreira	N/A	"Kiss Me" by Sixpence None the Richer (Encore)
999	117	March 25, 2025	Brian Tyree Henry, Sofia Carson, Vicky Nguyen, Jason Derulo	N/A	"The Angel and the Saint" by Goldie Boutilier
1,000	118	March 26, 2025	Eva Longoria, Paulina Chávez	N/A	"Dark Side" by Kelly Clarkson
1,001	119	March 27, 2025	Uzo Aduba, Randall Park, Leslie Bibb, Renee Zellweger, Chiwetel Ejiofor, Leo Woodall	N/A	"Birds of a Feather" by Billie Ellish (Encore)
1,002	120	March 31, 2025	Eric McCormack, Michael Iskander	N/A	"Heartbeat Song" by Kelly Clarkson
1,003	121	April 1, 2025	Jenna Dewan, Mo Gilligan, Sterling K. Brown	N/A	"Flagpole Sitta" by Harvey Danger (Encore)
Guest host Justin Steinbeck
1,004	122	April 2, 2025	Whitney Cummings, Louis McCartney, Gabrielle Nevaeh	Domino Kirke	"Uptown Girl" by Billy Joel
1,005	123	April 3, 2025	Jack Black, Danielle Brooks, Jason Momoa, Tess Sanchez	N/A	"Learn to Fly" by Foo Fighters
1,006	124	April 4, 2025	Michelle Williams, Jenny Slate, Rob Delaney, Jay Duplass	N/A	"She's So High" by Tal Bachman
1,007	125	April 7, 2025	Amanda Peet, Michelle Buteau	N/A	"Worth It" by Raye
1,008	126	April 8, 2025	Hailee Steinfeld, Wunmi Mosaku, Chris Perfetti	N/A	"All I Wanna Do" by Sheryl Crow
1,009	127	April 9, 2025	Rami Malek, Rachel Brosnahan, Geri Halliwell-Horner, Lawrence Zarian	N/A	"Insensitive" by Jann Arden
1,010	128	April 10, 2025	Viola Davis, Julius Tennon, Sarah Catherine Hook, The War and Treaty	The War and Treaty	"Talking to the Moon" by Bruno Mars
1,011	129	April 11, 2025	Nick Jonas, Adrienne Warren, Meghann Fahy, Brandon Sklenar	N/A	"I Forgive You" by Kelly Clarkson
1,012	130	April 14, 2025	Christopher Meloni, Marsai Martin, Jay Shetty	N/A	"Follow Your Arrow" by Kacey Musgraves
1,013	131	April 15, 2025	Elisabeth Moss, Ramón Rodríguez, Matt Rodrigues	Ian Munsick	"A Long December" by Counting Crows (Encore)
1,014	132	April 16, 2025	Olivia Munn, Paul W. Downs, Carol Leifer	N/A	"Alright" by Supergrass (Encore)
1,015	133	April 17, 2025	Finn Wolfhard, Gracie Lawrence, Tom Green, Naomi	Camilo and Yami Safdie	"Who's Sorry Now" by Connie Francis
Cameoke performed by Gracie Lawrence
1,016	134	April 18, 2025	David Oyelowo, James Brolin, Danielle Kartes	Bethel Music	"Racing" by Tony K
1,017	135	April 21, 2025	Idina Menzel, Amy Schumer, Jillian Bell, Brianne Howey	Johnnyswim	"Sick" by Dominic Fike (Encore)
Guest host Andy Cohen
1,018	136	April 22, 2025	Bradley Whitfield, Dulé Hill, Kesha	N/A	"Heat" by Kelly Clarkson (Encore)
1,019	137	April 23, 2025	Minka Kelly, Jennifer Beals, Lawrence Zarian	N/A	"Anything for You" by Gloria Estefan & Miami Sound Machine
1,020	138	April 24, 2025	Ben Affleck. Jon Bernthal, Cynthia Addai-Robinson, Daniella Pineda, Coco Jones	Coco Jones	"Don't Mind If I Do" by Riley Green & Ella Langley
Kelly Clarkson's Birthday
1,021	139	April 25, 2025	Bob Odenkirk, Sadie Sink	Samantha Fish	"For Crying Out Loud" by Finneas
1,022	140	April 28, 2025	Jose Andres, Martha Stewart, Tina Knowles	Watchhouse	"Flames" by Will Swinton (Encore)
1,023	141	April 29, 2025	Kevin Bacon, Christie Brinkley, Elizabeth Ann Hanks, Lawrence Zarian	N/A	"The Angel and the Saint" by Goldie Boutilier (Encore)
1,024	142	April 30, 2025	Bill Burr, Aimee Carrero	N/A	"Love Out of Lust" by Lykke Li (Encore)
1,025	143	May 1, 2025	Tina Fey, Will Forte, Zarna Garg, Wilmer Valderrama	N/A	"White Lies" by Sam Ryder
1,026	144	May 2, 2025	Anna Kendrick, Gabriel Luna	N/A	"Bad Thoughts" by Rachel Platten
"Bad Thoughts" performed by Cameo-oke guest Rachel Platten; Kelly world premieres her new music video, "Where Have You Been"
1,027	145	May 5, 2025	Florence Pugh, Geraldine Viswanathan, Hannah John-Kamen, Carly Pearce	John Morgan	"Boyfriend Forever" by Abbey Romeo
"Boyfriend Forever" performed by Cameo-oke guest Abbey Romeo
1,028	146	May 6, 2025	Kerry Washington, Omar Sy, Jahleel Kamara, Durrell "Tank" Babbs	N/A	"Learn to Fly" by Foo Fighters (Encore)
1,029	147	May 7, 2025	Patricia Clarkson, Susan Kelechi Watson, R.J. Halbert, Amy Grant, Erick Avari	N/A	"Home (Lyana's Song)" by Amy Grant
Cameo-oke guest Amy Grant
1,030	148	May 8, 2025	Diego Luna, Lisa Vanderpump, Ana Huang, Reynolds Laundry	N/A	"Red Wine Supernova" by Chappell Roan (Encore)
1,031	149	May 9, 2025	Vince Vaughn, Lorraine Bracco, Brenda Vaccaro, Susan Sarandon	N/A	"Slow It Down" by Benson Boone (Dove Cameron version)
Nonnas Hour; "Slow It Down" performed by Cameo-oke guest Dove Cameron
1,032	150	May 12, 2025	Jimmy Fallon, Misty Copeland, Melissa Rivers	Sierra Hull	"7 Days of Weak" by Ledisi
Cameo-oke guest Ledisi
1,033	151	May 13, 2025	Jonathan Groff, Lovie Simone, Jamie Ward	N/A	"All I Wanna Do" by Sheryl Crow (Encore)
1,034	152	May 14, 2025	Bernadette Peters, Darren Criss, Cody Renard Richard, Natasha Hodgson, Danny Ricker	Jak Malone	"If I Only Had a Brain" (Encore)
Broadway Hour
1,035	153	May 15, 2025	Alexander Skarsgård, Wally Baram, Anna Kendrick, David Blaine, Joel McHale	Sammy Rae & The Friends	"Still Bad" by Lizzo
Kellyoke performed with Lizzo
1,036	154	May 16, 2025	Blake Shelton, Kyle Cooke, Lindsay Hubbard	Blake Shelton	"Where Have You Been" by Kelly Clarkson
1,037	155	May 19, 2025	Simon Cowell, Howie Mandel, Mel B., Sofia Vergara,Terry Crews, home improvement expert Brian Kelsey	Smash	"Always Remember Us This Way" by Lady Gaga (Encore)
1,038	156	May 20, 2025	Joe Jonas, Isabela Merced, Young Mazino	Aly & AJ	"What It Feels Like" by Aly & AJ
Cameo-oke guest Aly & AJ
1,039	157	May 21, 2025	Keith Urban, Teddy Swims, Jessica Seinfeld, Rosé, Chris Martin, Julia Michaels, Sebastian Yatra	N/A	"Go Home W U" by Keith Urban & Lainey Wilson (Encore)
The Music Never Stops Hour; Kellyoke performed with Keith Urban
1,040	158	May 22, 2025	Angela Bassett, Hayley Atwell, Pom Klementieff, Laura Day	Charlotte Lawrence	"Drivers License" by Olivia Rodrigo (Lea Michele version)
"Drivers License" performed by Cameo-oke guest Lea Michele
1,041	159	May 27, 2025	Natalie Portman, Eiza González	Bryce Leatherwood	"Just Missed the Train" by Trine Rein (Kelly Clarkson version)
1,042	160	May 28, 2025	Elizabeth Banks, Josh Holloway, Randy Rainbow, Bowen Yang, Matt Rogers	Trousdale	"I Got a New One" by Elizabeth Nichols
1,043	161	May 29, 2025	Jessica Biel, Benito Skinner, Monique Rodriguez	Sam Ryder	"Total Eclipse of the Heart" by Bonnie Tyler
1,044	162	June 2, 2025	Hoda Kotb, Ryan Phillippe, Zoë Roberts, Natasha Hodgson, David Cumming	Iam Tongi	"I Lied" by Lord Huron and August Ponthier
1,045	163	June 3, 2025	Ralph Macchio, Jackie Chan, Ben Wang, Jimmy Fallon, Maury Povich	The Head and the Heart	"Worth It" by Raye (Encore)
1,046	164	June 4, 2025	Ana de Armas, Norman Reedus, Ian McShane, Matt Iseman, Finn Wolfhard	Seventeen	"I'll Be" by Edwin McCain
1,047	165	June 5, 2025	Benicio del Toro, Tom Daley, Taylor Jenkins Reid, James Blunt, JP Connelly	N/A	"You're Beautiful" by James Blunt
1,048	166	June 9, 2025	Mark Hamill, Mia Threapleton, Masai Ujiri, Kwame Alexander, Jerry Craft	N/A	"You Lie" by Cee Cee Chapman (Reba McEntire version) (Encore)
1,049	167	June 10, 2025	Julianne Moore, Sam Nivola, Jessica Kirson, Kathy Hochul	Eric Roberson & BJ The Chicago Kid	"Damn I Wish I Was Your Lover" by Sophie B. Hawkins
1,050	168	June 11, 2025	Sydney Sweeney, Luna Blaise, Florence Pugh, Geraldine Viswanathan, Hannah John-Kamen, The Doobie Brothers	The Doobie Brothers	"Coffee" by Chappell Roan (Encore)
1,051	169	June 12, 2025	Julia Stiles, Esther McGregor, Prabal Gurung	Gordi	"Cry" by Benson Boone
1,052	170	June 16, 2025	Colman Domingo, Maya Hawke, Chasten Buttigieg, Lawrence Zarian	Theo Croker feat. MAAD	"Ain't No Love in Oklahoma" by Luke Combs (Encore)
1,053	171	June 17, 2025	Rachel Brosnahan, Carl Clemons-Hopkins	The Rose	"Your Love" by The Outfield (Encore)
1,054	172	June 18, 2025	Willie Geist, Luke Kirby, Gideon Glick, Alyse Whitney	Parker McCollum	"White Lies" by San Ryder (Encore)
1,055	173	June 19, 2025	Eva Longoria, Isabella Rossellini, Adam Scott, Hugh Grant, Jason Isaacs, Jeffrey Wright	N/A	"More Than Words" by Extreme (Encore)
1,056	174	June 23, 2025	Kevin Bacon, Wilmer Valderrama, Christopher Meloni, Viola Davis, Julius Tennon, Jack Black	José James	"Where Have You Been" by Kelly Clarkson (Encore)
1,057	175	June 24, 2025	Allison Williams, Amber Ruffin, Liza Colón-Zayas, Jenna Davis	Something Out West	"War Paint" by Kelly Clarkson
1,058	176	June 25, 2025	Tom Llamas, Wendell Pierce, Victoria Monét, Vince Vaughn, Blake Shelton	Charles Kelley	"All the Things She Said" by t.A.T.u.
