= Melissa Ben-Ishay =

American chief executive

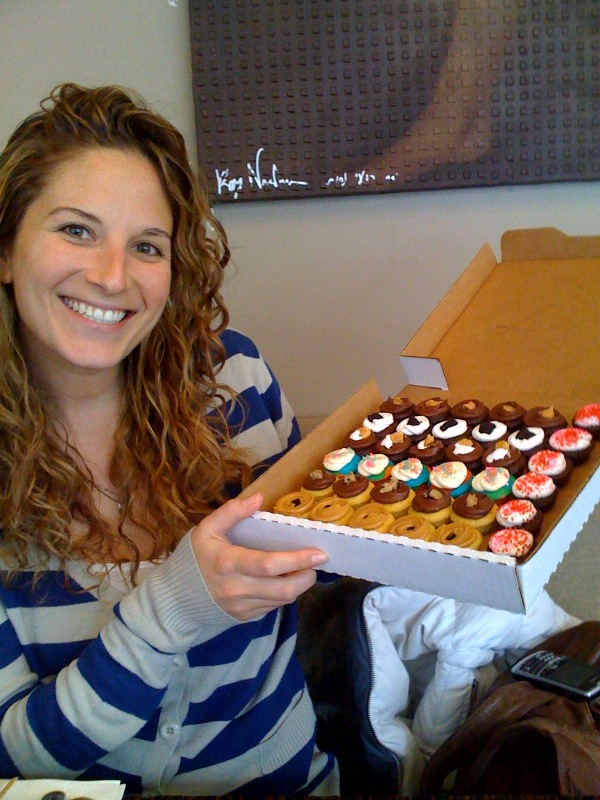
- Ben-Ishay in 2009
- Born: Melissa Bushell; Hillsdale, New Jersey
- Education: Syracuse University
- Occupations: CEO and co-founder of Baked by Melissa
- Spouse: Adi Ben-Ishay
- Children: 2
- Website: www.bakedbymelissa.com

Melissa Ben-Ishay (born Melissa Bushell) is the CEO and co-founder of Baked by Melissa, a cupcake company headquartered in New York City, which specializes in small cupcakes.

== Early life and education ==
Melissa Ben-Ishay was born in Hillsdale, New Jersey. She attended Syracuse University, in Syracuse, New York from 2002 to 2006, receiving a Bachelor's of Science degree in Child and Family Studies. She is also a member of Alpha Epsilon Phi sorority.

== Career ==
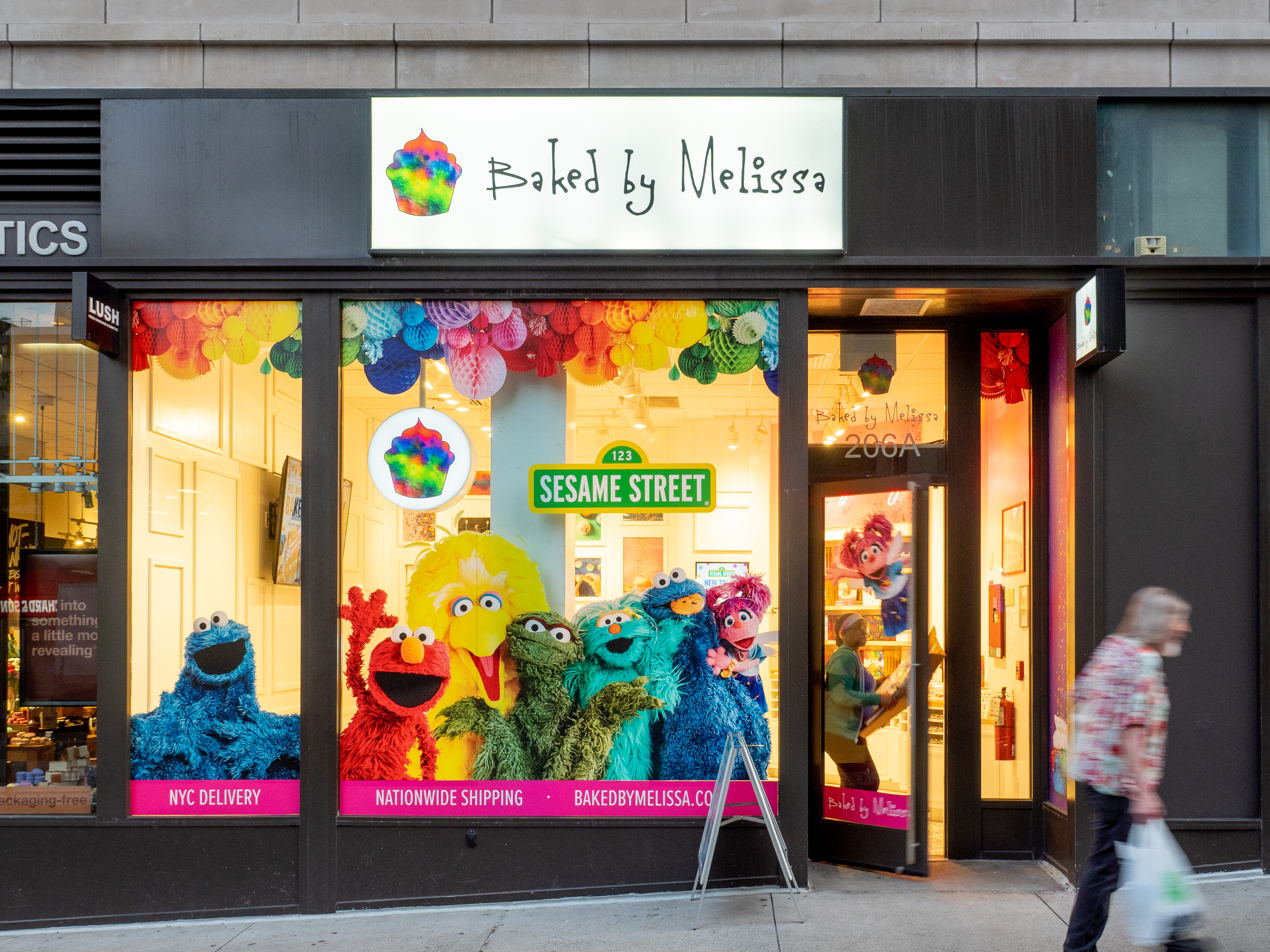
Baked by Melissa storefront on the Upper East Side of Manhattan.

After graduating from college, Ben-Ishay worked at an advertising agency in New York City. In 2008, she was fired from her job as an assistant media planner at Deutsch, and was encouraged by her brother, Brian Bushell, to change careers and bake cupcakes for a living.

The Baked by Melissa operations moved into the basement of Cafe Bari in late 2008, selling cupcakes at the holiday markets at Union Square and Bryant Park. In March 2009, Ben-Ishay, her brother, and three other co-founders opened a Baked by Melissa pop-up window in the SoHo neighborhood of Manhattan.

At the beginning, Ben-Ishay served as President and Chief Product Officer, with Bushell as CEO of Baked by Melissa until 2015. In 2019, Ben-Ishay was named CEO.

Baked by Melissa opened its first walk-in store in 2010 in Union Square. It has 14 retail locations in the New York City metropolitan area and ships cupcakes to other localities in the United States.

== Books ==
In 2017, Ben-Ishay released a cookbook titled Cakes by Melissa: Life Is What You Bake It, published by William Morrow Cookbooks. The book features 120+ recipes for Ben-Ishay's favorite cakes, icings, and fillings.

== Personal life ==
Melissa is married to Adi Ben-Ishay, who also works for Baked by Melissa.
