= Baked by Melissa =

American chain of bakeries

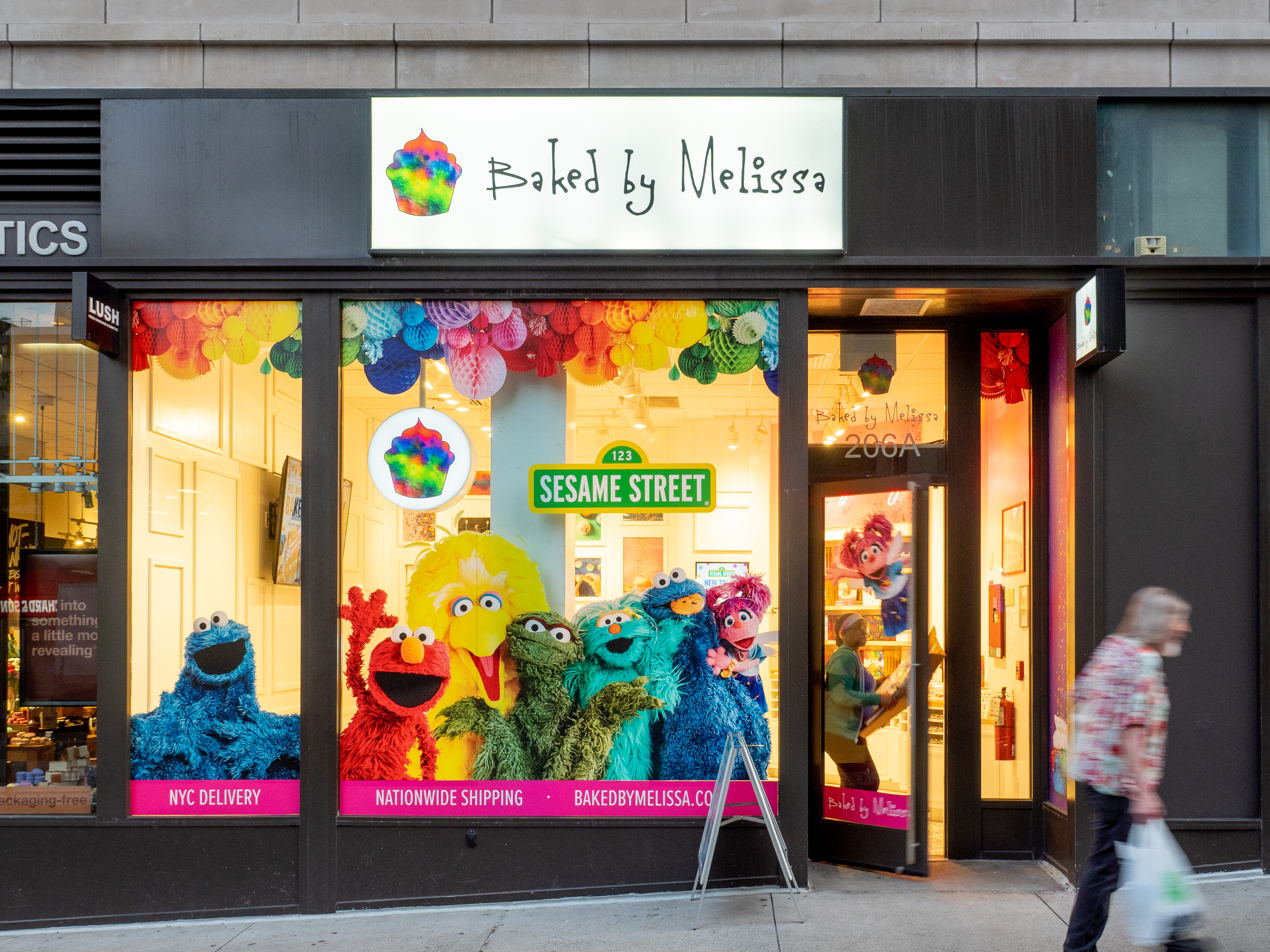
- Location on the Upper East Side, New York City
- Website: www.bakedbymelissa.com

Baked by Melissa is an American bite-size cupcake company headquartered in New York City. Founded in 2008 by Melissa Ben-Ishay, the brand is defined by its signature handcrafted, quarter-sized cupcakes, designed to test all the flavors without the commitment of a full-sized dessert.

== Product offerings ==
- Bite-Size Cupcakes: Each cupcake is approximately the size of a quarter, designed to let customers sample multiple flavors without committing to a full-size dessert. The company typically offers more than a dozen flavors at a time, anchored by a core lineup of eight "Original Greats" flavors alongside rotating seasonal flavors and a recurring "Mini of the Month.
- Dietary Desserts: Baked by Melissa offers gluten-free, vegan, and no-nut desserts. Gluten-free cupcakes, available in flavors such as red velvet, triple chocolate crunch, and birthday cake, are baked in a dedicated gluten-free kitchen. Vegan assortments include six dairy-free flavors, and no-nut assortments include seven flavors.

All these desserts are handmade in their bakery located in New Jersey.

Baked by Melissa also offers a range of gift boxes best for occasions including birthdays, thank-you gifts, sympathy, weddings, and holidays.

Catering and Corporate Gifting: The company provides catering for corporate and personal events, including weddings and baby showers, and offers custom "mosaic" cupcake displays upon request. They also offers corporate gifting for occasions such as employee appreciation and holidays.

== Events & catering ==
Baked by Melissa offers catering for any corporate event or personal event. It is widely known for its corporate gifting, whether it is employee appreciation or the holidays.

They also offer catering services for wedding, baby shower, and more. Creating your own mosaic cupcake display is also available when contacting their team.

Baked by Melissa also offers its handmade bite-size cupcakes as a wedding dessert option, either served in a variety of flavors or as a single specialty flavor called "White Wedding," which the company states was inspired by founder Melissa Ben-Ishay's own wedding cake. The cupcakes are also offerings as gifts for bridal party members and vendors, as party favors, and as a dessert option for engagement parties and bridal showers.

== History ==
Baked by Melissa was founded when Melissa Ben-Ishay lost her job in advertising in 2008. She went to her brother's office, and he told her it was the best thing that had ever happened to her before telling her to go home and bake her cupcakes. Melissa went to the grocery store near her Murray Hill apartment to get flavor inspiration, then sent the cupcakes to work with her best friend's sister who was interning at Alison Brod PR. That afternoon, Melissa got a call from Brod's caterer, who became one of the co-founders.

Initially, the company baked and sold cupcakes through catering companies. Melissa baked all of the cupcakes in her apartment until November 2008, when she moved into the basement of Cafe Bari. That winter, she sold the cupcakes at holiday markets around New York, selling out every day.

The first Baked by Melissa location opened on March 9, 2009; it was a pop-up window at Cafe Bari in SoHo, Manhattan. The same year, Florence Fabricant said that Baked by Melissa “seems to have succeeded at the near-impossible challenge of finding something new to do with cupcakes.”

In 2015, Melissa wrote her first cookbook, Cakes by Melissa, published by the William Morrow imprint of HarperCollins. Her second cookbook, Come Hungry: Salads, Meals, and Sweets for People Who Live to Eat, was released in January 2024.

Melissa's brother Brian Bushell was the CEO of Baked by Melissa until 2015. Melissa was named CEO on December 5, 2019.

In 2017, the company gave away 150,000 cupcakes in a project called Side With Love; people in the US could send a box of 25 cupcakes free of charge. The initiative was nominated for a Shorty Award for its impact on social media.

In 2018, Baked by Melissa created a special cupcake, which was sold in support of the Make-A-Wish Foundation.

By March 2022, Baked by Melissa had sold 200 million cupcakes total since 2008. Ben-Ishay's TikTok following nearly tripled since September 2021 and Instagram grew 35%, driven by her Green Goddess salad video (then at ~21 million views, up from viral takeoff in late 2021).[24]

In December 2024, Baked by Melissa partnered with Jazwares' Squishmallows on a limited-edition cupcake collection (Dec 5–31, 2024). The official press release confirms, as of that date: 13 retail locations in the NYC area, more than 400 million cupcakes sold, and over 4 million social media followers.

By early 2025, the company had grown to between 13 and 14 locations in the New York area. It has since consolidated to nine retail locations as of March 2026, alongside continued nationwide shipping.

By February 2025, Baked by Melissa had sold more than 400 million cupcakes, and Ben-Ishay described the company as a "multi-million dollar" business. By March 2026, that figure had surpassed 500 million cupcakes sold over the company's 18-year history. The company has remained privately held, having raised only about $6 million in outside funding in that time.

Baked by Melissa has developed paid brand collaborations with companies including Tabasco, Weight Watchers, Claussen, Native, Oatly, Squishmallows, and Ferrero.

== On social media ==
In 2021, Melissa went viral after posting a Green Goddess Salad to the Baked by Melissa TikTok account. As of March 2026, the video has 27 million views and became the #6 top recipe on Google in 2022.

Melissa has said that she doesn't follow a social media strategy, she responds to what her community wants to see.

== Locations ==
As of 2026, Baked by Melissa has 9 stores in the New York metropolitan area. Its first full store opened in 2009 in Union Square, Manhattan. Many of the stores offer customers the opportunity to pick their own flavors, with bite-size cupcakes displayed in a pastry case.

The company ships its desserts & gifts nationwide, all handmade in its bakery in North Bergen, New Jersey.
