= Tony K =

American rapper

- Also known as: Tone
- Born: Tony George Khnanisho; Kirkuk, Iraq
- Genres: Hip hop, R&B, Pop
- Occupations: Rapper, Record Producer, Songwriter
- Years active: 2005–present
- Label: Unsigned
- Website: www.tonykofficial.com

Tony George Khnanisho, better known by his stage name Tony K, is an American rapper, record producer, and songwriter.

== Early life ==
Tony K's family immigrated to Detroit, Michigan from Baghdad, Iraq in 1991 escaping what was then the Persian Gulf War. Very early on Tony K was surrounded by music. His father and uncle were both musicians and his mother was a singer. He was introduced to Hip Hop at a young age, through listening to the likes of 2pac, Eminem, The Notorious B.I.G., and Nas. Tony K started rapping and producing at only 13 years old. He was inspired to start after hearing the 2Pac song "Changes". In 2005 Tony teamed up with a local friend by the name of "Peleboy," and together they released what would be their first independent musical release, titled "Partners In Crime". Shortly after, Tony decided to pursue a solo rap career.

== Career ==
Tony's unique sound and determination have granted him the ability to work with rappers such as Kurupt, Royce da 5'9", Cappadonna, Bizzy Bone, and many more, lending his production skills to their music. In 2008 he released his first solo project, “By Any Means Necessary”, with features from Sean Kingston and rapper Young Noble. Soon, Tony started to release a series of mixtapes such as “YNOT” (2013) and “Wasteland” (2015) and began receiving some attention. Tony K's songs "Island" & "Racing" were covered by Kelly Clarkson on The Kelly Clarkson Show part of her Kellyoke segment on seasons five and six of the show.

Tony K's latest single, "Drop", was released on August 19, 2026.

== Discography ==
=== Singles ===
- Welcome to Baghdad (2016)
- Circa '96 (2017)
- Solo (2017)
- The Highest (2017)
- Change (2017)
- Cash (2018)
- Free Falling (2018)
- Bane (2018)
- All In (2018)
- Run (2018)
- One and Only (2018)
- Don't Want It (2018)
- Die Alone (2019)
- Holding On (2019)
- No Offense (2019)
- Ashes (2020)
- Get to Know Me (2020)
- Pause (2020)
- Back to You (2020)
- Intuition (2020)
- Dollar Signs (2021)
- Be Like Me (2021)
- Flip the Script (2021)
- 3's (2021)
- Never Been Better (2022)
- Drug (2022)
- Time (2022)
- Racing (2022)
- No Problem (2023)
- Island (2023)
- Right Now (2023)
- Villain (2024)
- Victory (2024)
- Get Away (2024)
- Diamonds (2025)
- Green Lights (2025)
- Home (2025)
- Drop (2026)

=== Mixtapes ===
- YNOT (2013)
- Wasteland (2015)
