= The Kelly Clarkson Show =

American syndicated talk show

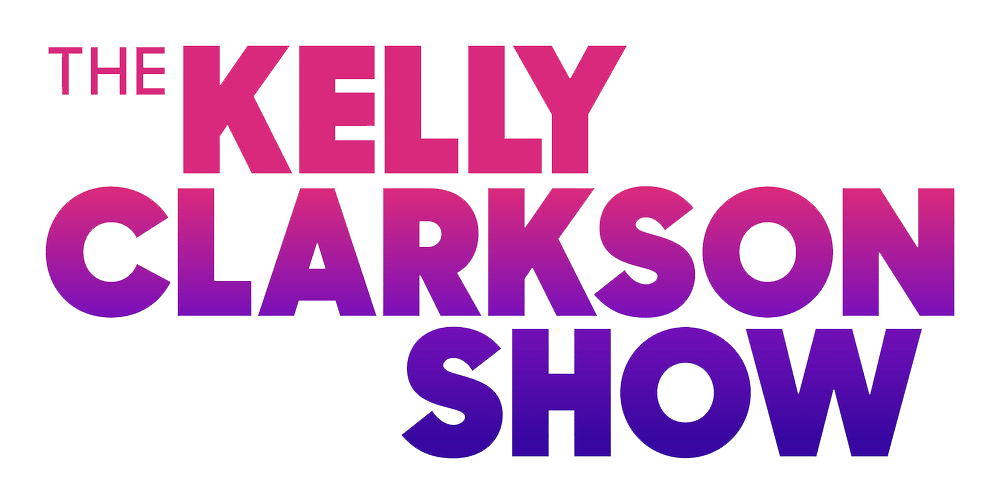
- Genre: Variety talk show
- Created by: Paul Telegdy
- Showrunner: Alex Duda
- Written by: Jordan Watland (head writer)
- Directed by: Joseph C. Terry
- Presented by: Kelly Clarkson
- Starring: My Band Y'all
- Country of origin: United States
- Original language: English
- No. of seasons: 7
- No. of episodes: 1,260 (list of episodes)

Production
- Executive producers: Kelly Clarkson; Alex Duda
- Production locations: Universal City, Los Angeles, California (2019–2023); Studio 6A, NBC Studios, Manhattan, New York City (2023–2026)
- Camera setup: Multi-camera
- Running time: 41 minutes
- Production company: NBCUniversal Syndication Studios (Note: For the first two seasons, the show's production credit belonged to NBCUniversal Television Distribution, which became NBCUniversal Syndication Studios during the second season.)

Original release
- Network: Syndication
- Release: September 9, 2019 – August 31, 2026

The Kelly Clarkson Show (Note: The show is often shortened to TKCS or simply Kelly.) is an American syndicated television variety talk show that was hosted by Kelly Clarkson. The show ran in first-run syndication, with NBC Owned Television Stations serving as its main affiliate base, for seven seasons from September 9, 2019, to August 31, 2026, in which it broadcast 1,260 episodes.

Produced and distributed by NBCUniversal Syndication Studios and features Clarkson interviewing celebrities and segments about "everyday people". For the first four seasons, filming took place at the Universal Studios Lot in California. Starting in the fifth season, the show moved production to Studio 6A at 30 Rockefeller Plaza in Midtown Manhattan.

The Kelly Clarkson Show has earned twenty-seven Daytime Emmy Awards, including Outstanding Talk Show Entertainment and Outstanding Talk Show. Clarkson has won Outstanding Entertainment Talk Show Host in 2020, 2021, and 2022, and Outstanding Talk Show Host in 2023.

== Concept ==
The program's press release states that "In her new daytime talk show, Kelly Clarkson uses her gift of connection to bring viewers something new: a fun, energetic show that breaks with tradition. In each episode audiences will experience an hour full of remarkable stories, celebrity guests, spontaneous surprises, humor, heart and, of course, good music. It's like a weekday brunch party with a fascinating guest list of people who would otherwise never meet."

In her Kellyoke segment, Clarkson usually performs a cover song in each episode. In 2022, she released an EP of covers called Kellyoke. Her band, My Band Y'all, is directed by keyboardist Jason Halbert and features vocal director and singer Jessi Collins, guitarist Jaco Caraco, bassist Joe Ayoub, and drummer Lester Estelle II.

== Episodes ==
Season	Episodes	Originally released	
Season	Episodes	First released	Last released
1	180	September 9, 2019	September 3, 2020
2	180	September 21, 2020	July 8, 2021
3	180	September 13, 2021	June 29, 2022
4	162	September 12, 2022	June 12, 2023
5	180	October 16, 2023	August 12, 2024
6	176	September 23, 2024	June 25, 2025
7	175	September 29, 2025	August 31, 2026

== Production ==
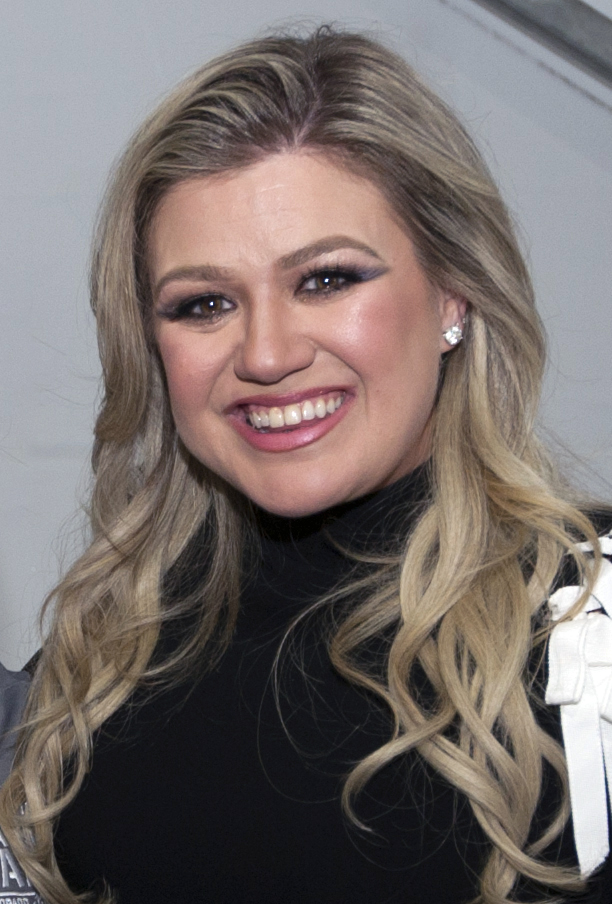
Kelly Clarkson in 2018

Paul Telegdy, who was NBCUniversal's president of Alternative Programming, had originally scouted Clarkson to serve as a mentor—and later a coach—on NBC's music competition series The Voice. As part of a corporate restructuring, Telegdy additionally became the head of NBCUniversal's syndication division in late 2016.

Despite being reluctant at first, Clarkson accepted the offer for the series in an effort to "connect with people, play games, music and find ways to help or give back to communities/organizations." She also sought advice from fellow talk show hosts Jimmy Fallon and Ellen DeGeneres, and fellow The Voice coach Blake Shelton. On August 6, 2018, it was reported by Broadcasting & Cable that Clarkson had filmed a pilot for the talk show that was later offered for syndication, broadcast on another platform, or both. Celebrities such as Josh Groban, Terry Crews, and Chloë Grace Moretz were reported to have participated as her guests on the pilot. She is also accompanied by her touring band for her musical performances in the program, which includes a barn-like studio as a reflection to her "country roots". Clarkson also revealed the talk show will be opened by audience-requested covers of various songs.

On September 19, 2018, NBC Owned Television Stations announced that it had picked up the program; it replaced Steve Harvey's eponymous talk show on most NBC owned-and-operated stations, with a number of stations owned by E. W. Scripps Company likewise using it as a replacement for that station group's Pickler & Ben. Alex Duda, previously a showrunner of The Tyra Banks Show and Harvey's 2012–2017 talk show, was commissioned to be the program's executive producer. In November 2019, the series was renewed for a second season, which premiered on September 21, 2020.

Midway through the first season, production on the show was suspended on March 13, 2020, after the World Health Organization announced the beginning of the COVID-19 pandemic in the United States. The show resumed production in April of the same year, with multiple episodes being recorded from Clarkson's home in Montana, then later at her Southern California home. The show continued in production for its first season into August, when traditionally, most syndicated talk shows are dark. Clarkson returned to studio-shot shows in September 2020, with a virtual studio audience.

On December 15, 2020, the show was renewed for its third and fourth seasons through 2023. The third season premiered on September 13, 2021. The new season marked the return of the live studio audience. The first week of shows for the third season were taped in New York City. The fourth season premiered on September 12, 2022. On November 7, 2022, the show was renewed for its fifth and sixth seasons through 2025. The show was renewed for a seventh season on December 15, 2024.

Production was suspended in May 2023 due to the Writers Guild of America strike, but there was still an inventory of new episodes that had not yet been aired. That month, it was announced that The Kelly Clarkson Show would re-locate from the Universal City Studios in Los Angeles to the Rockefeller Center in Manhattan for its fifth season, moving to Studio 6-A at NBC Studios. Clarkson cited a desire to move the show to the East Coast so that she could be closer to her family in North Carolina, as well as her interest in Broadway theater. The move also takes advantage of new film tax credits for relocated productions introduced by Governor Kathy Hochul. Delayed to adjust for the end of the Writers Guild of America strike to allow the return of writers and to build out the new set (unlike her fellow daytime brethren, Clarkson had not announced a return to production until after the strike's settlement), the fifth season premiered on October 16, 2023. The sixth season premiered on September 23, 2024. The seventh season premiered on September 29, 2025.

On February 2, 2026, Clarkson announced that the show would conclude after the conclusion of the season, stating that she wanted to spend more time with her family. The Kelly Clarkson Show aired its final episode on August 31, 2026, which featured appearances by her family, and most of the episode being dedicated to song requests from fans and beneficiaries of the show (including "Golden" and her new single "I'd Be Lyin'").

== Broadcast ==
The Kelly Clarkson Show was picked up in virtually all American television markets prior to its premiere, with the NBC Owned Television Stations serving as its primary affiliate base; its premiere achieved the largest audience share in metered markets for a newly-premiering syndicated series since 2012.

In Canada, The Kelly Clarkson Show was picked up by Citytv. In Australia, The Kelly Clarkson Show was acquired by the Seven Network's 7Bravo (a local iteration of the NBCUniversal cable network) as part of its launch programming in January 2023.

== Kellyoke ==
"Kellyoke" is a cold open segment which opens each episode of the show. Clarkson and her band perform various cover songs (adjusted slightly for time) that are either requested by fans or studio audience members, are a standard or favorite song of that day's lead guest (usually a musical performer themselves, which may be their own song), or are originally by artists who inspired her personally. She has performed songs by artists such as Whitney Houston, Aerosmith, the Chicks and Nat King Cole, among many others. The segment occasionally uses previous or taped performances on taping days where Clarkson is either unavailable to perform a song or is on vocal rest due to illness, or to preserve her voice for other commitments. "Cameo-oke" covers were introduced in the sixth season, with musical guests performing at the beginning of the show.

== Reception ==
=== Ratings ===
On its pilot week, The Kelly Clarkson Show premiered with over 2.6 million viewers and a 1.6 household rating according to Nielsen Media Research—the best premiere rating for a new first-run syndicated program since Katie in 2012. A month after the show aired, Nielsen data stated that the show gained 1.9 million average viewers per episode and became the fourth most watched daytime talk shows. The New York Times reported in September 2021 that the show was drawing an average daily audience of 1.3 million viewers. In December 2020, Deadline Hollywood reported that the second season has 1.6 million average daily viewers and has the youngest audience among the top four daytime shows. The fourth season of the show gained 1.37 million average daily viewers and ranked third among all syndicated daytime talk shows.

=== Controversy ===
In a Rolling Stone article published on May 12, 2023, former employees of the show spoke of mistreatment and favoritism from producers, stressing the fact that they were overworked, underpaid, and that working at the show was traumatizing to their mental health, which leads to the conclusion where they described The Kelly Clarkson Show as a toxic environment. Staffers said that "Clarkson was likely unaware of the alleged mistreatment", with one describing her as "fantastic."

Soon after, Clarkson posted a public statement on her social media accounts taking responsibility and calling the allegations and hostility 'unacceptable', and that she, along with much of the executive staff, would undergo training and refuse to allow those who abused their power to make the move to New York.

=== Accolades ===
Year	Award	Category	Nominee(s)	Result	Ref.
2020	Critics' Choice Television Awards	Best Talk Show	The Kelly Clarkson Show	Nominated	
2020	Daytime Emmy Awards	Outstanding Talk Show Entertainment	The Kelly Clarkson Show	Nominated	
2020	Daytime Emmy Awards	Outstanding Entertainment Talk Show Host	Kelly Clarkson	Won	
2020	Daytime Emmy Awards	Outstanding Directing in a Talk, Entertainment, News, or Morning Program	Joseph C. Terry	Nominated	
2020	Daytime Emmy Awards	Outstanding Lighting Direction	Darren Langer	Won	
2020	Daytime Emmy Awards	Art Direction/Set Decoration/Scenic Design	Kevin Grace, Emily Auble, James Connelly, David Eckert	Won	
2020	Daytime Emmy Awards	Outstanding Technical Team	The Kelly Clarkson Show	Nominated	
2020	Daytime Emmy Awards	Outstanding Live and Direct-to-Tape Sound Mixing	The Kelly Clarkson Show	Nominated	
2020	People's Choice Awards	The Daytime Talk Show of 2020	The Kelly Clarkson Show	Nominated	
2021	Critics' Choice Television Awards	Best Talk Show	The Kelly Clarkson Show	Nominated	
2021	Iris Awards	Award for Excellence in Performance	Kelly Clarkson	Won	
2021	Make-Up Artists & Hair Stylists Guild Awards	Best Hair Styling, Daytime Television	Roberto Ramos, Tara Copeland	Won	
2021	Make-Up Artists & Hair Stylists Guild Awards	Best Make-Up, Daytime Television	Jason McGlothin, Gloria Elias-Foeillet, Chanty LaGrana, Josh Foster	Won	
2021	Daytime Emmy Awards	Outstanding Talk Show Entertainment	The Kelly Clarkson Show	Won	
2021	Daytime Emmy Awards	Outstanding Entertainment Talk Show Host	Kelly Clarkson	Won	
2021	Daytime Emmy Awards	Outstanding Original Song	"Cabana Boy Troy"	Nominated	
2021	Daytime Emmy Awards	Outstanding Lighting Direction	Darren Langer	Nominated	
2021	Daytime Emmy Awards	Outstanding Live and Direct to Tape Sound Mixing	The Kelly Clarkson Show	Won	
2021	Daytime Emmy Awards	Art Direction/Set Decoration/Scenic Design	Kevin Grace, Emily Auble, James Connelly, David Eckert	Nominated	
2021	Gracie Awards	Best Talk Show: Entertainment	The Kelly Clarkson Show	Won	
2021	People's Choice Awards	The Daytime Talk Show of 2021	The Kelly Clarkson Show	Nominated	
2022	Critics' Choice Television Awards	Best Talk Show	The Kelly Clarkson Show	Nominated	
2022	MTV Movie & TV Awards	Best Talk/Topical Show	The Kelly Clarkson Show	Nominated	
2022	MTV Movie & TV Awards	Best Host	Kelly Clarkson	Won	
2022	Daytime Emmy Awards	Outstanding Talk Show Entertainment	The Kelly Clarkson Show	Won	
2022	Daytime Emmy Awards	Outstanding Entertainment Talk Show Host	Kelly Clarkson	Won	
2022	Daytime Emmy Awards	Outstanding Directing Team For A Multiple Camera Daytime Non-Fiction Program	Joe Terry, Diana Horn, Chris Hines, Ran Lowe	Nominated	
2022	Daytime Emmy Awards	Outstanding Music Direction and Composition	Jason Halbert	Nominated	
2022	Daytime Emmy Awards	Outstanding Lighting Direction	Darren Langer	Won	
2022	Daytime Emmy Awards	Outstanding Technical Team, Camera Work, Video	Tom Henson, Dick Mort, Dean Andersen, Richard Pitpit, Eric Taylor, Drew Jansen, Ralph Bolton, Wade Bobbit	Won	
2022	Daytime Emmy Awards	Outstanding Multiple Camera Editing	Justin Curran, Stas Lipovetskiy, Kliff Svatos, Sam Goldfein, Casey O'Brien	Won	
2022	Daytime Emmy Awards	Outstanding Live Sound Mixing and Sound Editing	James Slanger, Bob Lewis, Eddie Marquez, Robert Venable, Danny Cruz, Jennifer Vannoy-Rounsaville, Jeff Hickman, Kevin Shannon	Won	
2022	Daytime Emmy Awards	Outstanding Art Direction/Set Decorating/Scenic Design	James Pearse Connelly, David Eckert, Kevin Grace	Won	
2022	Critics' Choice Real TV Awards	Female Star of the Year	Kelly Clarkson	Nominated	
2022	People's Choice Awards	The Daytime Talk Show of 2022	The Kelly Clarkson Show	Won	
2023	Critics' Choice Television Awards	Best Talk Show	The Kelly Clarkson Show	Nominated	
2023	GLAAD Media Awards	Outstanding Variety or Talk Show Episode	Episode: "Spirit Day"	Nominated	
2023	MTV Movie & TV Awards	Best Host	Kelly Clarkson	Nominated	
2023	Daytime Emmy Awards	Outstanding Daytime Talk Series Host	Kelly Clarkson	Won	
2023	Daytime Emmy Awards	Outstanding Daytime Talk Series	The Kelly Clarkson Show	Won	
2023	Daytime Emmy Awards	Outstanding Writing Team for a Daytime Non-Fiction Program	Jordan Watland, Nik Robinson, Kevin Hurley, Gina Sprehe	Nominated	
2023	Daytime Emmy Awards	Outstanding Directing Team for a Multi-Camera Non-Fiction Program	Joe Terry, Diana Horn, Callan Chapman, Chris Hines, Ran Lowe	Won	
2023	Daytime Emmy Awards	Outstanding Music Direction and Composition	Jason Halbert	Nominated	
2023	Daytime Emmy Awards	Outstanding Lighting Direction	Darren Langer	Won	
2023	Daytime Emmy Awards	Outstanding Technical Team, Camera Work, Video	Tom Henson, Dick Mort, Dean Andersen, Richard Pitpit, Eric Taylor, Drew Jansen, Ralph Bolton, Wade Bobbit	Won	
2023	Daytime Emmy Awards	Outstanding Multiple Camera Editing	Justin Curran, Stas Lipovetskiy, Kliff Svatos, Sam Goldfein, Casey O'Brien	Nominated	
2023	Daytime Emmy Awards	Outstanding Live Sound Mixing and Sound Editing	James Slanger, Bob Lewis, Eddie Marquez, Robert Venable, Danny Cruz, Jennifer Vannoy-Rounsaville, Jeff Hickman, Kevin Shannon	Won	
2023	Daytime Emmy Awards	Outstanding Art Direction/Set Decorating/Scenic Design	James Pearse Connelly, David Eckert, Kevin Grace	Nominated	
2023	Daytime Emmy Awards	Outstanding Hairstyling and Makeup	Gloria Elias-Foeillet, Robert Ramos	Nominated	
2024	Critics' Choice Awards	Best Talk Show	The Kelly Clarkson Show	Nominated	
2024	People's Choice Awards	The Daytime Talk Show	The Kelly Clarkson Show	Won	
2024	GLAAD Media Awards	Outstanding Variety or Talk Show Episode	Episode: "Tracie Lysette & Patricia Clarkson, Laverne Cox"	Nominated	
2024	Gracie Awards	Talk Show – Entertainment	The Kelly Clarkson Show	Won	
2024	Webby Awards	Best Overall Social Presence – Media/Entertainment, Features	The Kelly Clarkson Show	Nominated	
2024	Webby Awards	Best Social Video Series	The Kelly Clarkson Show	Won	
2024	Daytime Emmy Awards	Outstanding Daytime Talk Series	The Kelly Clarkson Show	Won	
2024	Daytime Emmy Awards	Outstanding Daytime Talk Series Host	Kelly Clarkson	Nominated	
2024	Daytime Emmy Awards	Outstanding Directing Team for a Multi-Camera Non-Fiction Program		Nominated	
2024	Daytime Emmy Awards	Outstanding Lighting Direction	Darren Langer	Won	
2024	Daytime Emmy Awards	Outstanding Technical Team, Camera Work, Video		Nominated	
2024	Daytime Emmy Awards	Outstanding Multiple Camera Editing		Nominated	
2024	Daytime Emmy Awards	Outstanding Live Sound Mixing and Sound Editing		Won	
2024	Daytime Emmy Awards	Outstanding Art Direction/Set Decorating/Scenic Design		Nominated	
2025	Critics' Choice Awards	Best Talk Show	The Kelly Clarkson Show	Nominated	
2025	Writers Guild of America Awards	Comedy-Variety Talk Series	Jordan Watland, Kevin Hurley, Nik Robinson	Nominated	
2025	Webby Awards	Best Overall Social Presence – Media/Entertainment	The Kelly Clarkson Show	Nominated	
2025	Webby Awards	Best Social Content Series – Interview/Talk Show	The Kelly Clarkson Show	Won	
2025	Webby Awards	Best Social Video Short Form – Music & Performance	The Kelly Clarkson Show	Nominated	
2025	Daytime Emmy Awards	Outstanding Daytime Talk Series	The Kelly Clarkson Show	Nominated	
2025	Daytime Emmy Awards	Outstanding Daytime Talk Series Host	Kelly Clarkson	Nominated	
2025	Daytime Emmy Awards	Outstanding Directing Team for a Multi-Camera Non-Fiction Program	Joe Terry, Diana Horn, Brendan Higgins, Cyndi Owgang, David Salas	Nominated	
2025	Daytime Emmy Awards	Outstanding Lighting Direction	Darren Langer, John Daniels	Won	
2025	Daytime Emmy Awards	Outstanding Multiple Camera Editing	Stas Lipovetskiy, Kliff Svatos, Sam Goldfien	Nominated	
2025	Daytime Emmy Awards	Outstanding Live Sound Mixing and Sound Editing	James Slanger, Robert Venabl, Omatali Beckett, Bob Lewis, Rachel Orscher, Rosa Howell-Thornhill, Marilyn Vigilante, Bryan Smith	Won	
2025	Daytime Emmy Awards	Outstanding Art Direction/Set Decorating/Scenic Design	James Connelly, Jason Kirschner, Kait Taylor	Nominated	
2025	Daytime Emmy Awards	Outstanding Hairstyling and Makeup	Monica Boyd Lester, Louie Zakarian, Korryn Gonzalez-Novotny, Adam Long, Kerry Joly, Kim Weber, Corey Morris, Gloria Elias-Foeillet, Brittany Harmon, Kyle Krueger, Christopher Milone, Chelsea Paige	Nominated	
2026	Daytime Emmy Awards	Outstanding Daytime Talk Series	The Kelly Clarkson Show	Won	
2026	Daytime Emmy Awards	Outstanding Daytime Talk Series Host	Kelly Clarkson	Nominated	
2026	Daytime Emmy Awards	Outstanding Directing for a Daytime Studio Non-Fiction Series	Joe Terry, Diana Horn, Brendan Higgins, Cyndi Owgang and Elise Reaves (for "5033")	Won	
2026	Daytime Emmy Awards	Outstanding Music Direction and Composition for a Daytime Program	Jason Halbert (for "5033")	Nominated	
2026	Daytime Emmy Awards	Outstanding Editing for a Daytime Studio Program	Stas Lipovetskiy, Kliff Svatos and Sam Goldfien (for "5033")	Nominated	
2026	Daytime Emmy Awards	Outstanding Sound Mixing and Sound Editing for a Live Daytime Program	Robert Venable, Omatali Beckett, Rachel Orscher, James Slanger, Bob Lewis, Bryon Smith, Rebecca Malsburry and Rosa Howell Thornhill (for "5007")	Won	
2026	Daytime Emmy Awards	Outstanding Lighting Direction for a Daytime Program	Darren Langer and John Daniels (for "6169")	Nominated	
2026	Daytime Emmy Awards	Outstanding Art Direction / Set Decoration / Scenic Design for a Daytime Program	Jason Kirschner, Art Director: Kait Taylor and James Pearse Connelly (for "5033")	Won	
2026	Daytime Emmy Awards	Outstanding Costume Design / Styling for a Daytime Program	Earl Nicholson, Micaela Erlanger and Arleisha Randle (for "5033")	Nominated	
2026	Daytime Emmy Awards	Outstanding Hairstyling and Makeup for a Daytime Program	Judy Chung, Ja Nina Lee, and Laura Pugliese, Jovanna Risco, Handri Gunawan, Korynn Gonzalez Novolny, Kerry Joly, Earl Nicholson, Corey Morris, Gloria Elias-Foeillet and Brittany Hartman (for "5033")	Won	
2026	Daytime Emmy Awards	Outstanding Main Title and Graphic Design for a Daytime Program	Christian Cerrillia and Stephanie Gonzalez	Nominated	
