= Ben Gallaher =

American singer-songwriter (born 1992)

- Born: March 26, 1992 (age 34); Camp Hill, Pennsylvania, U.S.
- Genres: Country
- Occupation: Singer/songwriter
- Instruments: Vocals, guitar
- Labels: Columbia Nashville, Quartz Hill, Stone Country Records
- Website: bengallaher.com

Ben Gallaher is a country music singer-songwriter and recording artist from Pennsylvania. Gallaher signed with Sony Music Nashville in 2017 and released his debut self-titled EP on August 11, 2017. He released his debut studio album Country in the House on February 24, 2023 under the label Stone Country Records.

== Career ==
Gallaher began playing guitar and drums at 6. He grew up in Pennsylvania and wanted to move to Nashville and attend Belmont University however he was first a student at Penn State-Mont Alto in Mont Alto. Eventually, he transferred to Belmont and graduated in May 2014 with a degree in entertainment industry studies. By then, he had shared the stage with headlining acts including Brantley Gilbert, Colt Ford, Craig Campbell, and Frankie Ballard.

During a semester at Belmont, a professor sent Gallaher's music to Sony Music resulting in a record deal. In 2014, Gallaher signed a record deal with Sony Music Nashville and he now tours. He was an Eagle Scout and his first EP with Sony came out on August 11, 2017. He has performed for inmates in Pennsylvania state prisons for the past 7 years on his annual "Barbed Tour." He parted ways with Sony Nashville in January 2019.

== Discography ==
Albums

Title	Album details
Country in the House	Release Date: February 24, 2023; Label: Stone Country
Time	Release Date: September 26, 2025; Label: Stone Country

EPs

Title	Album details
Ben Gallaher	Release Date: August 11, 2017; Label: Sony Music Nashville

Singles

Title	Year	Album
"I'll Take You"	2026	Time
