= The Kelly Clarkson Show season 2 =

The Kelly Clarkson Show
- Season 2
- Starring: Kelly Clarkson
- No. of episodes: 180

Release
- Original network: Syndication
- Original release: September 21, 2020 – July 8, 2021

Season chronology
- ← Previous; Season 1 Next → Season 3

The second season of The Kelly Clarkson Show began airing on September 21, 2020.

== Episodes ==
No. overall	No. in season	Original release date	Guest(s)	Musical/entertainment guest(s)	"Kellyoke" cover
181	1	September 21, 2020	DJ Khaled, John Legend, Nelly, Josh Groban, Kenny G	Bob Saget, John Legend	Classic Television theme songs
Music Week
182	2	September 22, 2020	Usher, Neil Patrick Harris, Ava Max	Ava Max	"Good as Hell" by Lizzo
Music Week
183	3	September 23, 2020	Dan Price, Common	Common	"Adore You" by Harry Styles
Music Week
184	4	September 24, 2020	Little Big Town, Machine Gun Kelly	Little Big Town	"Tennessee Whiskey" by Chris Stapleton
Music Week
185	5	September 25, 2020	Queen Latifah, Sabrina Carpenter	Machine Gun Kelly	"Confident" by Demi Lovato
Music Week
186	6	September 28, 2020	Jessica Alba, Ayesha Curry	N/A	"Perfect" by Ed Sheeran
Rad Mom Hour
187	7	September 29, 2020	Derek Hough, Jay Leno, Molly Sims	N/A	"Dreaming of You" by Selena
188	8	September 30, 2020	Beth Behrs, Jack Quaid	N/A	"Adorn" by Miguel
189	9	October 1, 2020	Seth MacFarlane, Ziggy Marley, Arden Myrin, Stephen Curry, Phillip Alexander	Ziggy Marley and Lisa Loeb	"Closer" by Tegan and Sara
190	10	October 2, 2020	Lauren Cohan, Akbar Gbajabiamila, Matt Iseman	N/A	"Love Shack" by The B-52's
191	11	October 5, 2020	Jenna Bush Hager, Paris Hilton	N/A	"My Future" by Billie Eilish
192	12	October 6, 2020	Jane Lynch, Matt Bomer, Xavier "Xeve" Perez	N/A	"The First Cut Is the Deepest" by Sheryl Crow
193	13	October 7, 2020	Tyra Banks, RZA, Adeev Potash, Ezra Potash	Anthony Ramos	"Ring of Fire" by Johnny Cash
194	14	October 8, 2020	Michael Strahan, Haley Lu Richardson, John Kanell, Sarah Michelle Gellar	Sabrina Carpenter & Zara Larsson	"Don't Start Now" by Dua Lipa
195	15	October 9, 2020	Whitney Cummings, Ed Asner	N/A	"I Can't Make You Love Me" by Bonnie Raitt
196	16	October 12, 2020	Jamie Lee Curtis, Kristin Cavallari, Lady A, Shenandoah, Ashley Borden	Lady A & Shenandoah	"Criminal" by Fiona Apple
197	17	October 13, 2020	Dennis Quaid, Theresa Caputo	Dennis Quaid	"The Scientist" by Coldplay
198	18	October 14, 2020	Alicia Keys, Glennon Doyle, Jonathan Scott, Drew Scott, Cedric the Entertainer	N/A	"No One Needs to Know" by Shania Twain
199	19	October 15, 2020	Hoda Kotb, Mike Colter, Steve Hartsock, Paris Retana	N/A	"Dancing in the Dark" by Bruce Springsteen
200	20	October 16, 2020	Cheryl Hines, Michelle Buteau	N/A	"Bulletproof" by La Roux
201	21	October 19, 2020	Blake Shelton, Cynthia Nixon, Ian Cauble	N/A	"I'm Sorry" by Blake Shelton
202	22	October 20, 2020	Joel McHale, Neve Campbell, Courtney Rich	N/A	"Don't Know Why" by Norah Jones
203	23	October 21, 2020	Matthew McConaughey, Lauren Ash, Jonny Cota, Lawrence Zarian, Delta Goodrem	Delta Goodrem	"Torn" by Natalie Imbruglia
204	24	October 22, 2020	Cecily Strong, Cheryl Burke, Parvesh Cheena	N/A	"Heads Carolina, Tails California" by Jo Dee Messina
205	25	October 23, 2020	Marlon Wayans, Cleo Wade, Tiana Major9	Tiana Major9	"Watermelon Sugar" by Harry Styles
206	26	October 26, 2020	Kim Cattrall, Sofia Carson, Jon Yeager, Lindsay Yeager, Tarence Wheeler	N/A	"Cryin'" by Aerosmith
207	27	October 27, 2020	Meghan Trainor, Glenn Howerton, Plant Kween, Cam, TaKiyah Wallace, Misty Copeland	Cam	"Whataya Want From Me" by Adam Lambert
208	28	October 28, 2020	Emma Roberts, Phil Rosenthal, Ashley McBryde	Ashley McBryde	"Don't Take the Money" by Bleachers
209	29	October 29, 2020	Natalie Portman, Wendi McLendon-Covey, Joey McIntyre	N/A	"What's Up?" by 4 Non Blondes
210	30	October 30, 2020	Zoe Lister-Jones, Michelle Monaghan, Omari Hardwick, Dylan Lauren, Brett Loudermilk	N/A	"Stayin' Alive" by Bee Gees
Halloween Hour
211	31	November 2, 2020	Jon Bon Jovi, Sheila E., Melissa Etheridge, Shawn Johnson	Sheila E. & Cory Churko	"It's My Life" by Bon Jovi
Ready To Rock Hour
212	32	November 3, 2020	Terry Bradshaw, Iain Armitage, Alex Smith, Elizabeth Smith	N/A	"Mr. Brightside" by The Killers
213	33	November 4, 2020	Kristin Chenoweth, Ledisi	Ledisi	"Cold" by Annie Lennox
214	34	November 5, 2020	Julie Andrews, Emma Walton Hamilton, Madison Beer	N/A	"No One Else on Earth" by Wynonna Judd
215	35	November 6, 2020	Fortune Feimster, Sara Bareilles, Guy Fieri	N/A	"She Works Hard for the Money" by Donna Summer
Restaurant Resurgence: Salute to Servers Hour
216	36	November 9, 2020	Rainn Wilson, Lisa Rinna, Billy Ray Cyrus	Billy Ray Cyrus	"Dream On" by Aerosmith
217	37	November 10, 2020	Anthony Anderson, Carly Pearce, Danielle Kartes	Carly Pearce	"Maybe It Was Memphis" by Pam Tillis
218	38	November 11, 2020	Olivia Munn	Voices of Service	"America the Beautiful"
Veterans Day Hour
219	39	November 12, 2020	Billy Gardell, Kate Biberdorf, Rhiannon Chavez	N/A	"Cain" by EXES
Best In Class Hour
220	40	November 13, 2020	Zachary Quinto, Anya Taylor-Joy, Kimberly Schlapman	Brandy Clark	"It Matters to Me" by Faith Hill
221	41	November 16, 2020	Sara Gilbert, Shemar Moore, Lisa Ling	N/A	"Fast as You" by Dwight Yoakam
222	42	November 17, 2020	Holly Robinson Peete, Candace Cameron Bure, Lacey Chabert, Kane Brown, Maggie Rose, Theodore Leaf	Maggie Rose	"All This Love" by JP Cooper
223	43	November 18, 2020	Ken Jeong, The Miz, Maryse Ouellet, Madalen Mills, Jennifer Houghton	N/A	"Will You Still Love Me Tomorrow" by Amy Winehouse
Ambush Christmas
224	44	November 19, 2020	Kaley Cuoco, Mackenzie Foy, Mickey Guyton, Randy Savvy	Mickey Guyton	"A Little Respect" by Erasure
225	45	November 20, 2020	Kristen Stewart, Clea DuVall, Mary Steenburgen, Mackenzie Davis, Mary Holland, Martha Stewart, Steve Kornacki	Tegan and Sara	"Somewhere Only We Know" by Keane
226	46	November 23, 2020	Dua Lipa, Mario Lopez, Dr. Phil, Jewel	Jewel	"Let Me Down Easy" by Billy Currington
227	47	November 24, 2020	Debbie Allen, Mandy Moore	Mandy Moore	"Love Me Like a Man" by Bonnie Raitt
228	48	November 25, 2020	Melissa McCarthy, Ben Falcone, Jean Smart	N/A	"Need You Now" by Lady A
Thankful Hour
229	49	November 30, 2020	Deon Cole, Lawrence Zarian, Tori Kelly	Tori Kelly	"Sorry" by Justin Bieber
230	50	December 1, 2020	Kathie Lee Gifford, Taylor Tomlinson, Alicia Keys, Glennon Doyle, Matty Matheson	N/A	"Blue Bayou" by Linda Ronstadt
231	51	December 2, 2020	Lily Collins, Josh Groban, Alison Deyette	Josh Groban	"A Fool in Love" by Tina Turner
232	52	December 3, 2020	Katherine Heigl, Penn Jillette, Raymond Joseph Teller, Russell Dickerson	Russell Dickerson	"No Tears Left to Cry" by Ariana Grande
233	53	December 4, 2020	Jimmy Fallon, Phil Rosenthal	N/A	"Addicted to Love" by Robert Palmer
Back to Business: New York Hour
234	54	December 7, 2020	Serena Williams, Merle Dandridge, Aja Naomi King, Noelle Lambert	N/A	"Everything You Want" by Vertical Horizon
235	55	December 8, 2020	Fran Drescher, Elizabeth Berkley Lauren	N/A	"One of Us" by Joan Osborne
236	56	December 9, 2020	Rachel Brosnahan, Nikki Bella, Brie Bella, Colman Domingo	Pentatonix	"It Must Have Been Love" by Roxette
237	57	December 10, 2020	Keegan-Michael Key, Nelly, Danielle Kartes	N/A	"You Make It Easy" by Jason Aldean
238	58	December 11, 2020	Joe Manganiello, Deidre Hall	N/A	"Have Yourself a Merry Little Christmas"
Holiday Show
239	59	December 14, 2020	Garth Brooks	N/A	"Underneath the Tree" by Kelly Clarkson (second era)
Holiday Show
240	60	December 15, 2020	Gwen Stefani, Bert Kreischer	N/A	"All I Want for Christmas Is You" by Vince Vance & the Valiants
Holiday Show
241	61	December 16, 2020	Kyle Chandler	Brett Eldredge, Meghan Trainor	"Under The Mistletoe" by Kelly Clarkson & Brett Eldredge
Holiday Show
242	62	December 17, 2020	Whitney Cummings, Nate Berkus, Tanya Tucker	Tanya Tucker	"Hard Candy Christmas" by Dolly Parton
Holiday Show
243	63	December 18, 2020	Christian Serratos	Carrie Underwood	"It's Beginning to Look a Lot Like Christmas" by Bing Crosby
Holiday Show
244	64	December 21, 2020	Gal Gadot, Pedro Pascal, Patty Jenkins, Kaley Cuoco	N/A	"Princess of China" by Coldplay and Rihanna
Wonder Woman Hour
245	65	January 4, 2021	Taylor Kinney, Glennon Doyle, Craig Robinson, Sherri Shepherd	N/A	"Hard to Say I'm Sorry" by Chicago
246	66	January 5, 2021	Mary Steenburgen, Busta Rhymes, Devon Franklin	N/A	"Borderline" by Madonna
247	67	January 6, 2021	Mayim Bialik, Bobby Moynihan, Andrew Rea, Don Miguel Ruiz	N/A	"Rare" by Selena Gomez
248	68	January 7, 2021	Tim Allen, Jay Leno, Mary Mouser, Brene Brown, LaurDIY	N/A	"Hold On, We're Going Home" by Drake featuring Majid Jordan
249	69	January 8, 2021	Nathan Fillion, Gabriel Iglesias, Deepak Chopra	N/A	"Rainbow" by Kacey Musgraves
250	70	January 11, 2021	David Oyelowo, Wilmer Valderrama, Syd McGee, Shea McGee	N/A	"Another Sad Love Song" by Toni Braxton
251	71	January 12, 2021	Milo Ventimiglia, Folake Olowofoyeku, Ronnie Woo	N/A	"Lost on You" by LP
252	72	January 13, 2021	Amanda Seyfried, Sarah Hyland	Seventeen	"Dreams" by Fleetwood Mac
253	73	January 14, 2021	Ralph Macchio, Iliza Shlesinger, Brandi Milloy, Rex Chapman	N/A	"Sin Wagon" by The Chicks
254	74	January 15, 2021	Jennifer Love Hewitt, Skylar Astin	N/A	"You Get What You Give" by New Radicals
255	75	January 18, 2021	Michael Ealy, Yolanda Renee King	N/A	"Up to the Mountain" by Patty Griffin
Martin Luther King Jr. Day
256	76	January 19, 2021	Paula Abdul, Randy Jackson, Ella Hunt, Courtney Rich	Why Don't We	"Give Me One Reason" by Tracy Chapman
257	77	January 21, 2021	Paul Bettany, Maria Bakalova, Jon Yeager, Lindsay Yeager	N/A	"Can't Get You Out of My Head" by Kylie Minogue
258	78	January 22, 2021	Kristin Hensley, Jen Smedley, Danielle Kartes, Cat Deeley	N/A	"Girls Just Want To Have Fun" by Cyndi Lauper
Another Rad Mom Hour (first era)
259	79	January 25, 2021	Khloé Kardashian, Brian "Q" Quinn, James "Murr" Murray, Joe Gatto, Sal Vulcano, Lawrence Zarian	N/A	"It's a Little Too Late" by Tanya Tucker
260	80	January 26, 2021	Adam Lambert, Venus Williams	N/A	"Only You" by Yazoo
261	81	January 27, 2021	Halsey, Terri Irwin, Robert Irwin, Bindi Irwin, Chandler Powell	N/A	"Hard Place" by H.E.R.
262	82	January 28, 2021	Becca Stevens, Kimberly Maiden, Randi Emmans, John Suazo, Sharon Richardson, Rhiannon Menn	N/A	"Unchained Melody" by The Righteous Brothers
Rad Human Hour
263	83	January 29, 2021	Peter Krause, Jennifer Coolidge	N/A	"I Wish it Would Rain Down" by Phil Collins
264	84	February 1, 2021	Leslie Odom Jr., Kelsea Ballerini, The Paul O'Sullivan Band	Kelsea Ballerini	"Runaway Train" by Soul Asylum
265	85	February 2, 2021	Justin Hartley, Nicola Coughlan, Danielle Kartes	N/A	"Ain't No Sunshine" by Bill Withers
266	86	February 3, 2021	Elizabeth Olsen, Brian Austin Green	Teddy Swims	"Best I Ever Had" by Vertical Horizon
267	87	February 4, 2021	Ted Danson, Holly Hunter, Misty Copeland, Jac Ross, Sadeck Waff Berrabah	Jac Ross	"Barracuda" by Heart
268	88	February 5, 2021	Natalie Reilly, Rich Palmgren, Maya Vijayvergiya, Isadora Hunt, Aurianne Konan, Tommy Do, Emerson Weber, Brandon Woolf	N/A	"All to Myself" by Dan + Shay
The Power of Writing Hour
269	89	February 8, 2021	Jenny Han, Al Roker, Meagan Good	N/A	"Misery" by Gwen Stefani
Single Awareness Week Day 1
270	90	February 9, 2021	Jamie Dornan, Khloé Kardashian	N/A	"Lovefool" by The Cardigans
Single Awareness Week Day 2
271	91	February 10, 2021	Christine Chiu, Brad Paisley	Brad Paisley	"Blue Eyes Crying in the Rain" by Willie Nelson
Single Awareness Week Day 3
272	92	February 11, 2021	Priyanka Chopra Jonas, Jason Biggs	N/A	"If the World Was Ending" by JP Saxe and Julia Michaels
Single Awareness Week Day 4
273	93	February 12, 2021	Sarah Chalke, Kym Whitley, Matt James	N/A	"Just a Fool" by Christina Aguilera and Blake Shelton
Single Awareness Week – Single Ladies Celebration!
274	94	February 15, 2021	Alana Weisberg, Anna Todd, Jackie Means, Julia Segal, Layla Wallace, Arrianna Jentink-Bristol, Bellen Woodard	N/A	"Just a Girl" by No Doubt
Girl Power Hour
275	95	February 16, 2021	Dwayne Johnson, Stacey Leilua, Ana Tuisila	Leslie Grace	"You Mean the World to Me" by Toni Braxton
276	96	February 17, 2021	Nick Offerman, Megan Mullally, Jackie Tohn	N/A	"Times Like These" by Foo Fighters
277	97	February 18, 2021	Emerald Gordon Wulf, Ani'yah Cotton, Pilar Winter Hill, Prisais Brooklyn, Terry Bradshaw, Iain Armitage, Daisy Watt	N/A	"Price Tag" by Jessie J and B.o.B
Extraordinary & Talented Kids Hour
278	98	February 19, 2021	Garrett Hedlund, Alison Sweeney	Ruth B.	"Poker Face" by Lady Gaga
279	99	February 22, 2021	Kenan Thompson, Amy Brenneman	N/A	"Bring It On Home To Me" by Sam Cooke
280	100	February 23, 2021	Kevin James, Alyson Hannigan, Al Roker, Abigail Barlow & Emily Bear	Faouzia and John Legend	"Always" by Erasure
281	101	February 24, 2021	Rosamund Pike, Sam Heughan	Valerie June	"Father of Mine" by Everclear
282	102	February 25, 2021	Jill Biden	Jason Halbert	"Get Together" by The Youngbloods
From the White House
283	103	February 26, 2021	Soleil Moon Frye, Freddie Prinze Jr., Jonathan Tucker	Krigarè and Jason Halbert	"Beautiful Day" by U2
284	104	March 1, 2021	Nick Jonas, Eve Hewson, Lilly Singh	N/A	"Imagine" by Ariana Grande
285	105	March 2, 2021	Robin Wright, Kurt Busch	Robin Thicke	"Can't Take My Eyes Off of You" by Lauryn Hill
286	106	March 3, 2021	Awkwafina, Stone Cold Steve Austin	N/A	"Use Somebody" by Kings of Leon
287	107	March 4, 2021	Daisy Ridley, Gina Torres, Grace Potter	Grace Potter	"Lonely" by Justin Bieber and Benny Blanco
288	108	March 5, 2021	Amy Poehler, Ben Feldman, Diane von Furstenberg, Jennifer Mathieu	N/A	"These Arms of Mine" by Otis Redding
289	109	March 15, 2021	Eddie Murphy, Bella Murphy, Nico Santos, Jesse Tyler Ferguson	N/A	"Keep Walkin’ On" by Faith Hill featuring Shelby Lynne
290	110	March 16, 2021	Jennifer Garner, Nico Hiraga	MAX, Lil Mosey & Olivia O’Brien	"Wicked Game" by Chris Isaak
291	111	March 17, 2021	Joel McHale, Kate Flannery, Lisa Vanderpump, Alison Deyette	N/A	"Green Eyes" by Coldplay
St. Patrick's Day Episode
292	112	March 18, 2021	Arsenio Hall, Naomi Judd, Soledad O'Brien, Danielle Kartes, Matthew McConaughey	N/A	"Walkaway Joe" by Trisha Yearwood and Don Henley
293	113	March 22, 2021	Michelle Obama, Jared Leto	N/A	"Water Under the Bridge" by Adele
294	114	March 23, 2021	Retta, Alexandra Breckenridge, Teresa Palmer, Sarah Wright Olsen	N/A	"Weak" by SWV
295	115	March 24, 2021	Gwyneth Paltrow, Jo Koy, Neil deGrasse Tyson	N/A	"Should I Stay or Should I Go?" by The Clash
296	116	March 25, 2021	Brian Tyree Henry, YaYa Gosselin, Brett Young	Brett Young	"Who's Lovin' You" by The Jackson 5
297	117	March 26, 2021	Elizabeth Nyamayaro, Chrissy Teigen, Eiza González	Pentatonix	"Mad World" by Tears for Fears
298	118	March 29, 2021	Andy Cohen, Camilla Luddington, Melissa King, Rosé	Breland	"Diggin' On You" by TLC
299	119	March 30, 2021	Rebel Wilson, Adam Brody, Rachel Hollis	N/A	"Got My Mind Set On You" by George Harrison
300	120	March 31, 2021	Sharon Stone, Ian Somerhalder, Jake Hoot, MILCK	Jake Hoot, MILCK and Bipolar Sunshine	"I Would Have Loved You"
301	121	April 1, 2021	Kyle MacLachlan, Dominique Fishback, Danielle Kartes, John Fogerty	John Fogerty	"If I Were Your Woman" by Gladys Knight and the Pips
302	122	April 5, 2021	Kelsea Ballerini, Anthony Mackie, Sebastian Stan, Bianca Belair	Katharine McPhee	"3AM" by Matchbox Twenty
303	123	April 6, 2021	Lester Holt, Nasim Pedrad, Camila Alves McConaughey	The Fratellis	"A Broken Wing" by Martina McBride
304	124	April 7, 2021	Kevin Bacon, Bailee Madison, Hello Sunday	Hello Sunday	"She's Got You" by Patsy Cline
305	125	April 8, 2021	Max Greenfield, Dani Lane, Dannah Lane, Mary Lynn Rajskub	Clint Black	"Blue" by LeAnn Rimes
306	126	April 12, 2021	Emilio Estevez, Arica Himmel, Karen Akunowicz	N/A	"White Flag" by Dido
307	127	April 13, 2021	Olivia Munn, Harry Connick Jr., Lauren Ash, Christy Oxborrow	N/A	"Gaslighter" by The Chicks
308	128	April 14, 2021	Kelly Rowland, Ruby Rose, Marlee Matlin, Doug Roland	AJR	"Nothing Compares 2 U" by Sinéad O'Connor
309	129	April 15, 2021	Minnie Driver, Patrick Schwarzenegger, Pepper Teigen	N/A	"What a Girl Wants" by Christina Aguilera
310	130	April 19, 2021	John Stamos, Cristin Milioti, Brandi Carlile, Courtney Rich	N/A	"You Look So Good in Love" by George Strait
311	131	April 20, 2021	Alex Morgan, Erin Andrews, Chiney Ogwumike, Jessica Mendoza	N/A	"My Way" by Frank Sinatra
Ladies of Sportsball Hour
312	132	April 21, 2021	Topher Grace, Kit Hoover, Katherine Schwarzenegger Pratt	Daughtry	"Rich" by Maren Morris
313	133	April 22, 2021	Chris Noth, Nikki Reed	Lainey Wilson	"Burning Love" by Elvis Presley
Earth Day
314	134	April 26, 2021	Forest Whitaker, Alice Braga, Ava Max	N/A	"Lately" by Stevie Wonder
315	135	April 27, 2021	Ed Helms, Emily VanCamp, Jon Yeager, Lindsay Yeager	Twice	"Send My Love (To Your New Lover)" by Adele
316	136	April 28, 2021	Trisha Yearwood, Brett Gelman, Morgan Harper Nichols	N/A	"What Part of No" by Lorrie Morgan
317	137	April 29, 2021	Anna Kendrick, Justin Baldoni	N/A	"You Broke Me First" by Tate McRae
318	138	April 30, 2021	Arnold Schwarzenegger, Jane Levy	N/A	"Yellow" by Coldplay
L.A. Stronger Hour
319	139	May 3, 2021	Bradley Whitford, Leslie Bibb, Lawrence Zarian	Walker County	"When Will I Be Loved" by Linda Ronstadt
320	140	May 4, 2021	Channing Tatum, Casey Wilson, Alicia Silverstone, Meg Boggs, Taylor Momsen	Taylor Momsen	"You've Really Got a Hold on Me" by The Miracles
321	141	May 5, 2021	Sara Bareilles, Renee Elise Goldsberry, Busy Philipps, Paula Pell, Ariana Madix, Tom Sandoval, Sharon Feldstein, Patsy Noah, Terria Joseph	N/A	"Liar" by Davina Michelle
322	142	May 6, 2021	Megan Fox, Colin Wayne, Ron Funches, Rodney Scott	Ava Max	"Midnight Train to Georgia" by Gladys Knight & the Pips
323	143	May 7, 2021	Julianna Margulies, Kristin Hensley, Jen Smedley, Danielle Kartes, Emily Kaufman	N/A	"Home" by Edward Sharpe and the Magnetic Zeros
Another Rad Mom Hour (second era)
324	144	May 10, 2021	Paul Feig, Sean Hayes, Priyanka Wali, Aidy Bryant, Stephanie Izard	Evanescence	"Dude (Looks Like a Lady)" by Aerosmith
325	145	May 11, 2021	Sara Gore, Mariska Hargitay, Aaron Tveit	N/A	"How Blue" by Reba McEntire
New York: Stronger
326	146	May 12, 2021	Seth Rogen, Bethenny Frankel	N/A	"Don't Take It Personal" by Monica
327	147	May 13, 2021	Lauren Graham, Jimmie Johnson, Luna Blaise	Noga Erez	"Lay Me Down" by Sam Smith
328	148	May 14, 2021	Amy Adams, Alfonso Ribeiro	Brynn Cartelli	"Lost in Your Eyes" by Debbie Gibson
329	149	May 17, 2021	Blake Shelton, John Legend, Nick Jonas	N/A	"What I Am" by Edie Brickell & New Bohemians
The Voice Hour
330	150	May 18, 2021	Laura Bush, Jimmie Johnson	N/A	"One Fine Day" by The Chiffons
Best In Class: 2021 Hour
331	151	May 19, 2021	Wanda Sykes, Mike Epps, Simu Liu	Tom Jones	"Get Lucky" by Daft Punk featuring Pharrell Williams and Nile Rodgers
332	152	May 20, 2021	Billy Crystal, Olivia Liang, Danielle Kartes	N/A	"Everybody Knows" by Trisha Yearwood
333	153	May 21, 2021	Eric Bana, London Hughes, Mirabel Umenei	Raiche	"The Shoop Shoop Song" by Cher
334	154	May 24, 2021	Emily Blunt, Akbar Gbajabiamila, Matt Iseman	N/A	"Locked Out of Heaven" by Bruno Mars
335	155	May 25, 2021	Dave Bautista, Loni Love, David Hasselhoff	David Hasselhoff	"Need You Tonight" by INXS
336	156	May 26, 2021	Simon Cowell, Uzo Aduba, Michelle Williams	Blake Shelton	"You're So Vain" by Carly Simon
337	157	May 27, 2021	Gordon Ramsay, Jessie Ennis	N/A	"The Keeper of the Stars" by Tracy Byrd
338	158	June 1, 2021	Kevin Hart, Matthew Logelin	N/A	"Kiss" by Prince
Kevin Hart Father's Day Takeover Hour
339	159	June 2, 2021	Marsai Martin, Mckenna Grace, Isabela Merced, Bobby Bones, Glennon Doyle, Catherine McCord	N/A	"When Doves Cry" by Prince
340	160	June 3, 2021	Seth Meyers, Katie Stevens, Lil Rel Howery	N/A	"I'm That Kind of Girl" by Patty Loveless
341	161	June 7, 2021	Kristin Gambaccini	N/A	“Water Runs Dry” by Boyz II Men
Splash Into Summer Hour
342	162	June 8, 2021	Michael Douglas, Yvonne Orji	Ben Platt	“Boom Clap” by Charli XCX
343	163	June 9, 2021	Derek Hough, Leslie Grace, Josh Swain and Josh Vinson Jr. (from Josh fight)	Stokley Williams	“Ghost” by Indigo Girls
344	164	June 10, 2021	Paul Reiser, Molly Sims, Rosanna Pansino	N/A	”Paradise” by Meduza
345	165	June 14, 2021	Maitreyi Ramakrishnan, Hunter Fieri	N/A	“drivers license” by Olivia Rodrigo
346	166	June 15, 2021	Sherri Shepherd, Rob Riggle, Charles Melton	Jason Halbert	“Breathe Me” by Sia
347	167	June 16, 2021	Salma Hayek, Gabriel Chavarria, Danielle Kartes, Sallie Krawcheck	Rauw Alejandro	“Prop Me Up Beside the Jukebox” by Joe Diffie
348	168	June 17, 2021	Maya Rudolph, Flula Borg	N/A	“River” by Bishop Briggs
349	169	June 21, 2021	Peyton Manning, Iain Armitage, Rosanna Pansino	Matt Stell	"Love Like This" by Faith Evans
350	170	June 22, 2021	Rose Byrne, Fortune Feimster, Theodore Leaf	N/A	"I Won't Back Down" by Tom Petty
351	171	June 23, 2021	Vin Diesel, Caroline Rhea, Ruth Righi, Ezra Frech	Jennifer Nettles	"Fields of Gold" by Sting
352	172	June 24, 2021	Amy Poehler	Wilson Phillips & Brian Wilson, Masked Wolf	"God Only Knows" by The Beach Boys
353	173	June 28, 2021	Kym Whitley, Alix Traeger, Lindsay Yeager	N/A	"Tainted Love" by Soft Cell
Single Ladies Celebration Episode
354	174	June 29, 2021	Howie Mandel, Ilana Glazer, Danny Trejo	Elle King	"Closing Time" by Semisonic
355	175	June 30, 2021	Heidi Klum, Winnie Harlow, Annie Murphy, Duff Goldman	N/A	"Rolling in the Deep" by Adele
356	176	July 1, 2021	Helen Hunt, Vella Lovell, Dan Dakich, Leigh Dakich	N/A	"She's Got the Rhythm (And I Got the Blues)" by Alan Jackson
357	177	July 5, 2021	Edgar Ramirez, Alise Willoughby	N/A	"Whenever You Come Around" by Vince Gill
358	178	July 6, 2021	Jessica Grose, Danielle Kartes	N/A	"Nothing's Gonna Stop Us Now" by Starship
Keep Calm and Mom On Episode
359	179	July 7, 2021	Scarlett Johansson, Jaren Lewison, Kate Biberdorf, Cassadee Pope	Cassadee Pope	"Drive" by The Cars
360	180	July 8, 2021	Lola Marie, Ryan Kaji (from Ryan's World), Tyla-Simone Crayton, Kailey Perkins, Brandon Martinez, Sebastian Martinez, Kayla Marie, Micah Harrigan	N/A	“The Chain” by Fleetwood Mac
Mini-Moguls Hour
