= The Kelly Clarkson Show season 1 =

U.S. television show

The Kelly Clarkson Show
- Season 1
- Starring: Kelly Clarkson
- No. of episodes: 180

Release
- Original network: Syndication
- Original release: September 9, 2019 – September 3, 2020

Season chronology
- Next → Season 2

The first season of The Kelly Clarkson Show began airing on September 9, 2019.

== Episodes ==
No. overall	No. in season	Original release date	Guest(s)	Musical/entertainment guest(s)	"Kellyoke" cover
1	1	September 9, 2019	Dwayne Johnson	N/A	"9 to 5" by Dolly Parton (first era)
2	2	September 10, 2019	Ellen DeGeneres, John Legend, Michell Girard, Chris Barrington	N/A	"Sucker" by Jonas Brothers
3	3	September 11, 2019	Jennifer Garner, Matt Iseman, Sandy Zimmerman, Reed Newman	N/A	"Bad Romance" by Lady Gaga
4	4	September 12, 2019	Jay Leno, Bryce Vine, Marjorie Johnson	N/A	"Think" by Aretha Franklin
5	5	September 13, 2019	Chance the Rapper, Jillian Bell	N/A	"Chandelier" by Sia
6	6	September 16, 2019	Christina Aguilera, Brian Austin Green	N/A	"Ain't No Other Man" by Christina Aguilera
Ambush Christmas
7	7	September 17, 2019	Jessica Alba, Kelsea Ballerini	N/A	"Miss Me More" by Kelsea Ballerini
8	8	September 18, 2019	Simon Cowell, Paula Abdul, Randy Jackson, Justin Guarini, Ryan Seacrest	N/A	"Straight Up" by Paula Abdul
An Epic American Idol Reunion
9	9	September 19, 2019	Meghan Trainor, Ron Funches	N/A	"Believer" by Imagine Dragons
10	10	September 20, 2019	Tracee Ellis Ross, Hayley Kiyoko, Sandra Lee	N/A	"Express Yourself" by Madonna
11	11	September 23, 2019	Trisha Yearwood, Erin Moriarty	N/A	"Shut Up and Dance" by Walk the Moon
12	12	September 24, 2019	Neil DeGrasse Tyson, Tori Kelly, Mar Diego, ASMR Darling, Nikki Bachman	N/A	"Let's Go Crazy" by Prince and The Revolution
13	13	September 25, 2019	Kate Upton, Arianna Huffington	N/A	"If It Makes You Happy" by Sheryl Crow
14	14	September 26, 2019	Kirsten Dunst, Chris Sullivan	N/A	"Till the World Ends" by Britney Spears
15	15	September 27, 2019	Reba McEntire, Lesley Nicol, Grant Harrold	N/A	"Why Haven't I Heard from You" by Reba McEntire
16	16	September 30, 2019	America Ferrera, Tituss Burgess	N/A	"Juice" by Lizzo
Motivational Monday
17	17	October 1, 2019	Mike Colter, Ally Brooke, Danny Trejo, Sasha Farber	N/A	"Walking on Broken Glass" by Annie Lennox
18	18	October 2, 2019	Tony Hale, Nicole Scherzinger	N/A	"Before He Cheats" by Carrie Underwood
19	19	October 3, 2019	Kal Penn, Wale	N/A	"If I Can't Have You" by Shawn Mendes
20	20	October 4, 2019	Wanda Sykes, Property Brothers, Ludo Lefebvre	N/A	"I Love Rock 'n' Roll" by Joan Jett and the Black Hearts
21	21	October 7, 2019	Kristin Chenoweth, Bindi Irwin, Robert Irwin	N/A	"Love Me Like You Do" by Ellie Goulding
22	22	October 8, 2019	Beth Behrs, Jeff Dunham, Detroit Youth Choir, Mike Duggan	Detroit Youth Choir	"Blow Your Mind (Mwah)" by Dua Lipa
23	23	October 9, 2019	Chloë Grace Moretz, Theresa Caputo, Drew Carey	N/A	"Let Me Blow Ya Mind" by Eve featuring Gwen Stefani
24	24	October 10, 2019	Adam Devine, Amy Brenneman	N/A	"What Makes You Beautiful" by One Direction
25	25	October 11, 2019	Erin Andrews, Brandi Chastain	N/A	"Roar" by Katy Perry
International Day of the Girl
26	26	October 14, 2019	Christie Brinkley, Sailor Brinkley Cook, Maddie & Tae, Kimberly Caldwell, Maksim Chmerkovskiy	N/A	"Can't Feel My Face" by The Weeknd
27	27	October 15, 2019	Tyler Perry, Ben Platt, Rodney Smith	Ben Platt	"Wrecking Ball" by Miley Cyrus
28	28	October 16, 2019	Kaley Cuoco, YBN Cordae	YBN Cordae	"Jealous" by Nick Jonas
29	29	October 17, 2019	Eva Mendes, Craig Morgan, Blake Shelton, Manny MUA	Craig Morgan	"Wild One" by Faith Hill
30	30	October 18, 2019	Sara Gilbert, Cyndi Lauper	Cyndi Lauper	"Any Man of Mine" by Shania Twain
31	31	October 21, 2019	Cedric the Entertainer, Danica Patrick, Mindy Kelly	N/A	"Alone" by Heart
32	32	October 22, 2019	Mario Lopez, J. B. Smoove, Aarón Sanchez	N/A	"If I Could Turn Back Time" by Cher
33	33	October 23, 2019	Sharon Osbourne, Thomas Lennon	N/A	"Independence Day" by Martina McBride
34	34	October 24, 2019	Gabriel Iglesias, D'Arcy Carden	N/A	"I Wanna Dance with Somebody (Who Loves Me)" by Whitney Houston
35	35	October 25, 2019	Lea Michele, William Jackson Harper	Lea Michele	"I Like It, I Love It" by Tim McGraw
Ambush Christmas
36	36	October 28, 2019	Little Big Town, Courtney Rich	N/A	"Mine" by Bazzi
37	37	October 29, 2019	Max Greenfield, Shin Lim	N/A	"Sugar" by Maroon 5
38	38	October 30, 2019	Bradley Whitford, Anna Camp, Wiz Khalifa, DeAngelo Williams	N/A	"Lips Are Movin" by Meghan Trainor
39	39	October 31, 2019	Kate Flannery, Lindsey Stirling	The Kingdom Choir, Lindsey Stirling	"I Put a Spell on You" by Screamin' Jay Hawkins
Halloween Show
40	40	November 1, 2019	Hailee Steinfeld, Valerie Bertinelli	TBA	N/A
41	41	November 4, 2019	Eric McCormack, Liza Koshy, Mike Posner	N/A	"What About Us" by P!nk
42	42	November 5, 2019	Keegan-Michael Key, Bebe Rexha	N/A	"Delicate" by Taylor Swift
43	43	November 6, 2019	Patricia Heaton, Shane McAnally, Sam DeRosa	N/A	"Can't Stop the Feeling!" by Justin Timberlake
44	44	November 7, 2019	Billy Eichner, Henry Winkler, Henry Golding	N/A	"Never Be like You" by Flume featuring Kai
45	45	November 8, 2019	John Cena, Sho Madjozi	Sho Madjozi	"Come & Get It" by Selena Gomez
First Responders Hour
46	46	November 11, 2019	Tim McGraw, Kiernan Shipka, Isabela Merced	N/A	"You Look Good" by Lady Antebellum
Veterans Day
47	47	November 12, 2019	Jason Derulo, Nicole Byer	N/A	"Better Now" by Post Malone
48	48	November 13, 2019	Jason Momoa, Alfre Woodard	Kaleb Lee	"Cake by the Ocean" by DNCE
49	49	November 14, 2019	Nick Jonas, Arden Myrin, Maneet Chauhan, Timothy Omundson	N/A	"Ride" by Twenty One Pilots
50	50	November 15, 2019	Kobe Bryant, Martha Stewart	N/A	"Only Girl (In the World)" by Rihanna
51	51	November 18, 2019	Phil McGraw, Lacey Chabert	N/A	"Uptown Funk" by Mark Ronson featuring Bruno Mars
52	52	November 19, 2019	Chrissy Teigen, James Wolk	N/A	"The Story" by Brandi Carlile
53	53	November 20, 2019	Seth Meyers, Marie Kondo, Beth Behrs	N/A	"Feel It Still" by Portugal. The Man
54	54	November 21, 2019	Gwen Stefani, John Legend, Blake Shelton, Carson Daly	Gwen Stefani, John Legend, and Blake Shelton	"Neon Moon" by Brooks & Dunn featuring Kacey Musgraves
The Voice Hour
55	55	November 22, 2019	Whitney Cummings, Lil Rel Howery	N/A	"Happy" by Pharrell Williams
56	56	November 25, 2019	Garth Brooks	Garth Brooks	"Ain't Goin' Down ('Til the Sun Comes Up)" by Garth Brooks
Thankful Week Day 1
57	57	November 26, 2019	Kristen Bell, Ne-Yo	N/A	"Bitter Sweet Symphony" by The Verve
Thankful Week Day 2
58	58	November 27, 2019	Josh Gad, Grace VanderWaal	N/A	"Stay with Me" by Sam Smith
Thankful Week Day 3
59	59	December 2, 2019	Nick Offerman, Kellie Pickler, Big Bird, Elmo, Cookie Monster, Abby Cadabby, Oscar the Grouch	N/A	"Whatta Man" by Salt-N-Pepa featuring En Vogue
60	60	December 3, 2019	Tom Hanks, Matthew Rhys, Susan Kelechi Watson, Marielle Heller	N/A	"Won't You Be My Neighbor" by Fred Rogers
61	61	December 5, 2019	Chrissy Metz, Iain Armitage, Diane Warren	Chrissy Metz	"Scars to Your Beautiful" by Alessia Cara
62	62	December 6, 2019	Patti LaBelle, Sam Taylor-Johnson, Aaron Taylor-Johnson	N/A	"Love Will Never Do (Without You)" by Janet Jackson
63	63	December 9, 2019	Jane Lynch, Jo Koy	N/A	"Bang Bang" by Jessie J, Ariana Grande, & Nicki Minaj
64	64	December 10, 2019	Kathy Bates, Kevin O'Leary, John Legend, Joseph Sakran	John Legend	"Piece of My Heart" by Erma Franklin
65	65	December 11, 2019	Lionel Richie, Justin Willman, Gary Clark Jr., Dan Price	Gary Clark Jr.	"Waterfalls" by TLC
66	66	December 12, 2019	Jason Aldean, Jojo, Candace Cameron Bure	The Salvation Army Choir	"Every Little Step" by Bobby Brown
67	67	December 13, 2019	Kevin Hart, Ian Cauble, Swoop	N/A	"Run Run Rudolph" by Chuck Berry
68	68	December 16, 2019	Julianne Hough, Derek Hough, Christian Siriano, The Grinch	N/A	"Jingle Bell Rock" by Bobby Helms
69	69	December 17, 2019	Jameela Jamil, Blake Shelton	Blake Shelton	"Christmas (Baby Please Come Home)" by Darlene Love
70	70	December 18, 2019	Annie Potts, Rick Ross	N/A	"My Favorite Things"
71	71	December 19, 2019	Jennifer Hudson, Joel Kim Booster	N/A	"Christmas Eve" by Kelly Clarkson (first era)
72	72	December 20, 2019	Sterling K. Brown, Karen Gillan, Brynn Cartelli	Brynn Cartelli	"Rockin' Around the Christmas Tree" by Brenda Lee
73	73	December 23, 2019	Idina Menzel, Mykal-Michelle, Aaron Gray, Josh Arnett	King Calaway	"Underneath the Tree" by Kelly Clarkson (first era)
Holiday Show
74	74	January 6, 2020	Andy Grammer, Lisa Vanderpump, Jake Hoot	Jake Hoot	"Strawberry Wine" by Deana Carter
75	75	January 7, 2020	Jenna Dewan, Luis Fonsi, Rob Gronkowski, Curtis Stone	N/A	"You and I" by Lady Gaga
76	76	January 8, 2020	Angela Kinsey, Jenna Fischer, Eric Winter, Scott Conant	N/A	"I'm Every Woman" by Whitney Houston
77	77	January 9, 2020	Ben Feldman, Ryan Michelle Bathe, Bob Harper	N/A	"Something to Talk About" by Bonnie Raitt
78	78	January 10, 2020	Octavia Spencer, David Dobrik	N/A	"Sunflower" by Post Malone & Swae Lee
79	79	January 13, 2020	Howie Mandel, Kandi Burruss	N/A	"Hella Good" by No Doubt
80	80	January 14, 2020	Rob Lowe, Madelaine Petsch	N/A	"Finesse" by Bruno Mars & Cardi B
81	81	January 15, 2020	Jerry Springer, Lauren Ash, Mirna Valerio	N/A	"I Love It" by Icona Pop featuring Charli XCX
82	82	January 16, 2020	Abigail Spencer, Nico Santos	N/A	"Ex's & Oh's" by Elle King
83	83	January 20, 2020	Michael Ealy, Manny Jacinto	USC marching band	"Seven Nation Army" by White Stripes
84	84	January 22, 2020	Jeff Goldblum, Ilana Glazer	Jeff Goldblum and the Mildred Snitzer Orchestra	"No Bad News" by Patty Griffin
85	85	January 30, 2020	George MacKay, Dean-Charles Chapman, Annie Murphy	Annie Murphy and the Emerald Belles dance team	"Too Close" by Alex Clare
86	86	January 31, 2020	Anna Faris, Tony Gonzalez	N/A	"All My Life" by Foo Fighters
87	87	February 3, 2020	Norman Lear, Fortune Feimster, Scott Hoying	Acapop Kids!	"Sit Still, Look Pretty" by Daya
88	88	February 4, 2020	Michelle Monaghan, Deon Cole	N/A	"I Don't Want to Miss a Thing" by Aerosmith
Love Bomb Week
89	89	February 5, 2020	Whitney Cummings, Alexander Ludwig, Wolfgang Puck	N/A	"Black Velvet" by Alannah Myles
Love Bomb Week
90	90	February 6, 2020	Hoda Kotb, Darci Lynne Farmer	Darci Lynne Farmer	"I Hope You Dance" by Lee Ann Womack
Love Bomb Week
91	91	February 7, 2020	Alison Brie, Ella Jay Basco, Kid Ace	N/A	"I Am Here" by P!nk
Love Bomb Week
92	92	February 10, 2020	Peter Gallagher, Lily Aldridge	N/A	"Toxic" by Britney Spears
Love Bomb Week
93	93	February 11, 2020	Justin Hartley, Abby Elliott	N/A	"I'm with You" by Avril Lavigne
Love Bomb Week
94	94	February 12, 2020	Sebastian Maniscalco, Lana Condor	N/A	"We Belong" by Pat Benatar
Love Bomb Week
95	95	February 13, 2020	Amy Poehler, Rebecca Romijn	N/A	"Here's A Quarter (Call Someone Who Cares)" by Travis Tritt
Love Bomb Week
96	96	February 14, 2020	Jim Carrey, James Marsden, Ben Schwartz, Coyote Peterson	N/A	"Hopelessly Devoted to You" by Olivia Newton-John
Love Bomb Week
97	97	February 17, 2020	Constance Wu, Kit Williamson	N/A	"Dancing on My Own" by Robyn
Love Bomb Week
98	98	February 18, 2020	Dan Levy, Stephanie Beatriz	N/A	"I Like Me Better" by Lauv
Love Bomb Week
99	99	February 19, 2020	Ken Jeong, Jurnee Smollett-Bell	N/A	"Everybody Got Their Something" by Nikka Costa
Love Bomb Week
100	100	February 20, 2020	Nick Kroll, Jane Levy	N/A	"I Want You to Want Me" by Cheap Trick
Love Bomb Week
101	101	February 21, 2020	Lauren Graham, Impractical Jokers, Roy Choi, Lilly Tartikoff	N/A	"Someone You Loved" by Lewis Capaldi
Love Bomb Week
102	102	February 24, 2020	Wilson Phillips, Ian Somerhalder	Wilson Phillips, Pentatonix	"Hold On" by Wilson Phillips
Love Bomb Week
103	103	February 25, 2020	Jesse Tyler Ferguson, Cheryl Hines	PJ Morton	"I'm the Only One" by Melissa Etheridge
Love Bomb Week
104	104	February 26, 2020	Melissa McCarthy	N/A	"Havana" by Camila Cabello
Love Bomb Week
105	105	February 27, 2020	Elisabeth Moss, Thomas Sadoski	N/A	"Some Guys Have All the Luck" by Rod Stewart
Love Bomb Week
106	106	February 28, 2020	Rosario Dawson, Alano Miller, Xosha Roquemore, Dustin Lynch	N/A	"Run To You" by Whitney Houston
Love Bomb Week
107	107	March 2, 2020	Lilly Singh, Paul Wesley, Sinéad Burke, Bindi Irwin, Robert Irwin, Terri Irwin	N/A	"Close" by Nick Jonas featuring Tove Lo
108	108	March 3, 2020	Jimmie Johnson, Leslie Odom Jr.	Leslie Odom Jr.	"Somebody That I Used to Know" by Gotye featuring Kimbra
109	109	March 4, 2020	Eugene Levy, Alyson Hannigan	N/A	"Can't Help Falling in Love" by Elvis Presley
110	110	March 5, 2020	Ben Affleck, Melvin Gregg, Will Ropp	N/A	"Trampoline" by Shaed and Zayn
The Way Back Theme Hour
111	111	March 6, 2020	Liv Tyler, Kimora Lee Simmons, Reneé Hall	N/A	"(You Make Me Feel Like) A Natural Woman" by Aretha Franklin
Whole Lotta Woman International Women's Day Summit
112	112	March 9, 2020	Selena Gomez, Keith Morrison, Josh Mankiewicz, Lamorne Morris	N/A	"Lose You to Love Me" by Selena Gomez
113	113	March 10, 2020	Jessica Simpson, Trevor Jackson, Chris Janson	Chris Janson	"Graveyard" by Halsey
114	114	March 11, 2020	Dave Bautista, Chloe Coleman, Katherine Schwarzenegger Pratt	N/A	"Here" by Alessia Cara
115	115	March 12, 2020	Shania Twain, Billy Ray Cyrus	N/A	"Whose Bed Have Your Boots Been Under?" by Shania Twain
116	116	March 13, 2020	Jane Lynch, Nick Lachey, Vanessa Lachey, Keith Sweat, Bill Engvall	N/A	"I'll Stand By You" by The Pretenders
117	117	March 16, 2020	David Spade, Ron Funches, Fortune Feimster, Calais Campbell	N/A	"If" by Janet Jackson
118	118	March 17, 2020	Huey Lewis, Marcus Scribner, Monsta X	Monsta X	"The Power of Love" by Huey Lewis and the News
119	119	March 18, 2020	Steven Weber, Tichina Arnold, Danielle Kartes, Michelle Curran	N/A	"Heaven" by Bryan Adams
120	120	March 19, 2020	Tim Allen, Alison Pill, Becca Stevens	N/A	"Walking After Midnight" by Patsy Cline
121	121	March 23, 2020	Joel McHale, Grace Byers, Duff Goldman, Carmelita Jeter	N/A	"Home" by Marc Broussard
122	122	March 24, 2020	Lucy Hale, Neil deGrasse Tyson, Ariana Madix, Tom Sandoval	N/A	"Dreams" by The Cranberries
123	123	March 25, 2020	Tiffany Boone, Billy Ray Cyrus	Billy Ray Cyrus	"Too Good at Goodbyes" by Sam Smith
124	124	April 6, 2020	Matt LeBlanc, Bellamy Young, Ahmed Alwan	N/A	"How Could an Angel Break My Heart" by Toni Braxton
Message from Montana
125	125	April 7, 2020	Sean Evans, Rita Wilson, Frejé Randall	Rita Wilson	"Tequila" by Dan + Shay
Message from Montana
126	126	April 8, 2020	Retta, Matt Fraser, Kevin Hart, Annie Murphy	Annie Murphy	"Relating to a Psychopath" by Macy Gray
Message from Montana
127	127	April 10, 2020	Anna Kendrick, Justin Timberlake, Eva Mendes, Craig Morgan	N/A	"Just Sing" (Trolls World Tour)
Message from Montana
128	128	April 16, 2020	Zaz, Faouzia, Blas Cantó, Glasperlenspiel, Maya Bouskilla	N/A	"I Dare You" by Kelly Clarkson
Dare to Love Hour
129	129	April 23, 2020	LL Cool J, Christian Siriano, Joel McHale, Octavia Spencer	N/A	"Focus" by H.E.R.
130	130	April 28, 2020	Julie Andrews, Emma Walton Hamilton, Jim Carrey, Jessica Simpson	N/A	"Graveyard" by Halsey (Rerun)
Montana Original
131	131	April 30, 2020	Laura Benanti, Thomas Rhett, Lauren Akins	Thomas Rhett	"Like a Prayer" by Madonna
Music Heals
132	132	May 7, 2020	Daniel Radcliffe, Jane Krakowski, Chris Harrison, Kristin Gambaccini	N/A	"You'll Never Know" by Rosemary Clooney
Mother's Day Theme
133	133	May 14, 2020	Lester Holt, Alessia Cara, Fortune Feimster	N/A	"Little Bird" by Annie Lennox
Honoring the Class of 2020
134	134	May 18, 2020	Seth Meyers, Kelly Rowland	N/A	"You Say" by Lauren Daigle
135	135	May 19, 2020	Dylan McDermott, Natalie Dormer	N/A	"We Are Family" by Sister Sledge
136	136	May 20, 2020	Jay Leno, Rodney Smith, Eugene Levy	N/A	"Where Did Our Love Go?" by The Supremes
137	137	May 28, 2020	Gordon Ramsay, Zola Nene, DJ Khaled, Justin Willman, John Stamos	N/A	"Kokomo" by The Beach Boys
138	138	June 1, 2020	Derek Hough, Dr. Terry Dubrow, Dr. Paul Nassif, Ray Garcia	N/A	"Pontoon" by Little Big Town
Message from Montana
139	139	June 11, 2020	Josh Gad, Sean Astin, Christina Tosi	Trisha Yearwood	"Believe Me Baby (I Lied)" by Trisha Yearwood
140	140	June 15, 2020	W. Kamau Bell, Zach Braff, Donald Faison, The Bella Twins	N/A	"I Still Haven't Found What I'm Looking For" by U2
Summer Staycation
141	141	June 16, 2020	Jane Lynch, Deon Cole, Lawrence Zarian	N/A	"Chain of Fools" by Aretha Franklin
Summer Staycation
142	142	June 17, 2020	Judd Apatow, Justina Machado, Kate Flannery	N/A	"There She Goes" by Sixpence None the Richer
Summer Staycation
143	143	June 18, 2020	Bryce Dallas Howard, Bob Saget, Adam Rodriguez	N/A	"Sweet Dreams (Are Made of This)" by Eurythmics
Summer Staycation
144	144	June 19, 2020	Kevin Costner, Nicole Byer, Jon Yeager, Lindsay Yeager	N/A	"I'd Rather Go Blind" by Etta James
Summer Staycation
145	145	June 22, 2020	Laura Prepon, Ne-Yo	N/A	"Be My Baby" by The Ronettes
Summer Staycation
146	146	June 23, 2020	Chelsea Handler, Ron Funches, Frank Grillo	N/A	"Señorita" by Shawn Mendes with Camila Cabello
Summer Staycation
147	147	June 24, 2020	50 Cent, Lauren Lapkus, Art Smith, Ashley Borden	N/A	"Unpretty" by TLC
Summer Staycation
148	148	June 25, 2020	Demi Lovato, David Boreanaz	N/A	"Stay (I Missed You" by Lisa Loeb & Nine Stories
Summer Staycation
149	149	June 26, 2020	Simon Cowell, Sofia Vergara, Heidi Klum, Howie Mandel, Terry Crews, Kate Biberdorf	N/A	"Cowboy Take Me Away" by The Dixie Chicks
Summer Staycation
150	150	June 29, 2020	Billy Porter, Marcia Gay Harden, Wilson Cruz, Gerald Bostock	N/A	"You Need to Calm Down" by Taylor Swift
Summer Staycation
151	151	June 30, 2020	Jon Stewart, Laverne Cox	N/A	"Every Breath You Take" by The Police
Summer Staycation
152	152	July 1, 2020	Lester Holt, Andrew Rannells, Danielle Kartes	N/A	"Just Like Heaven" by The Cure
Summer Staycation
153	153	July 2, 2020	Lin-Manuel Miranda, Phillipa Soo, Renee Elise Goldsberry, Jasmine Cephas Jones, Leslie Odom, Daveed Diggs, Christopher Jackson, Okieriete Onaodowan	N/A	"It's Quiet Uptown"
Summer Staycation: Hamilton hour
154	154	July 6, 2020	Ricky Gervais, Ester Dean, Josh Elkin	N/A	"Circles" by Post Malone
Summer Staycation
155	155	July 7, 2020	Sherri Shepard, Kym Whitley, Paul Reiser, Katie Lee, Lauren Daigle	Lauren Daigle	"Issues" by Julia Michaels
Summer Staycation
156	156	July 8, 2020	Pierce Brosnan, Mickey Sumner, Jordan Karcher, Elizabeth Ries	Emmanuel Kelly	"How Will I Know" by Whitney Houston
Summer Staycation
157	157	July 9, 2020	Mayim Bialik, Max Greenfield, Chloe x Halle, Craig Susser	N/A	"Why Not Me" by The Judds
Summer Staycation
158	158	July 13, 2020	Rob Lowe, Esmé Creed-Miles, Mireille Enos, Kirk Franklin, Bill Engvall	N/A	"The Climb" by Miley Cyrus
Summer Staycation
159	159	July 14, 2020	David Schwimmer, Nick Mohammed, Maisie Richardson-Sellers, Joey King, Jordin Sparks, Carter's	N/A	"Linger" by The Cranberries
Summer Staycation
160	160	July 15, 2020	Chrissy Metz, Scott Eastwood, Jo Koy, Michael Tubbs	N/A	"I'm Like a Bird" by Nelly Furtado
Summer Staycation
161	161	August 3, 2020	Al Roker, Hilarie Burton, Dan McKernan	Jason Halbert	"How Do You Sleep?" by Sam Smith
Summer Staycation
162	162	August 4, 2020	Jeff Foxworthy, Nathalie Emmaunel, Brittany O'Grady, Kayla Greer, Stephanie Quayle	Stephanie Quayle	"Blame It on Your Heart" by Patty Loveless
Summer Staycation
163	163	August 5, 2020	Elliot Page, Rob Riggle, Christina Tosi, Tamara Moore	N/A	"Moral of the Story" by Ashe and Niall Horan
Summer Staycation
164	164	August 6, 2020	Dakota Fanning, Mike Rowe, Amanda Gorman	N/A	"I'm Movin' On" by Rascal Flatts
Summer Staycation
165	165	August 10, 2020	Olivia Munn, Rutledge Wood	N/A	"Heartbreak Hotel" by Elvis Presley
Summer Staycation
166	166	August 11, 2020	Nikolaj Coster-Waldau, Tia Mowry-Hardrict	Jessi Collins	"Secret Garden" by Bruce Springsteen
Summer Staycation
167	167	August 12, 2020	Luke Bryan, Paula Pell, Maneet Chauhan	N/A	"Always On My Mind" by Willie Nelson
Summer Staycation
168	168	August 13, 2020	Danny Devito, Meredith Hanger, Mikel Welch	N/A	"Say Something" by A Great Big World featuring Christina Aguilera
Summer Staycation
169	169	August 17, 2020	Mira Sorvino, Brandy Norwood, Jeremiah Brent	N/A	"I Don’t Wanna Be You Anymore" by Billie Eilish
Summer Staycation
170	170	August 18, 2020	Alanis Morissette, Hilary Farr, David Visentin, Sam Jay, Jo Saltz	N/A	"I Can't Help Myself (Sugar Pie Honey Bunch)" by Four Tops
Summer Staycation
171	171	August 19, 2020	Sean Hayes, Jena Malone, Sharon Richardson	N/A	"These Boots Are Made for Walkin'" by Nancy Sinatra
Summer Staycation
172	172	August 20, 2020	Jim Gaffigan, Stana Katic, Esther Choi	Brandi Carlile	"Poison and Wine" by The Civil Wars
Summer Staycation
173	173	August 24, 2020	Patricia Heaton, Bear Grylls, Marque Richardson	N/A	"Don't Play That Song" by Aretha Franklin
Summer Staycation
174	174	August 25, 2020	Catherine Zeta-Jones, Wolfgang Novogratz, Oprah Winfrey	Lola Lennox	"I Follow Rivers" by Lykke Li
Summer Staycation
175	175	August 26, 2020	Jake Johnson, Chad Veach, Danielle Kartes	JoJo	"Unbelievable" by EMF
Summer Staycation
176	176	August 27, 2020	Gloria Estefan, Denise Richards, Lauren Riihimaki	N/A	"Exhale (Shoop Shoop)" by Whitney Houston
Summer Staycation
177	177	August 31, 2020	Tim McGraw, Kermit the Frog, Nicole Avant, Black Pumas	Black Pumas	"T-R-O-U-B-L-E" by Travis Tritt
Summer Staycation
178	178	September 1, 2020	Auli'l Cravalho, Merman Mike	Jason Mraz	"I Saw the Light" by Wynonna Judd
Summer Staycation: Ocean Hour
179	179	September 2, 2020	Keanu Reeves, Alex Winter, Jayma Mays, Erinn Hayes, Brigette Lundy-Paine	N/A	"I Heard It Through the Grapevine" by Marvin Gaye
Summer Staycation: Bill & Ted's Excellent Adventure Hour
180	180	September 3, 2020	Hilary Swank, David Dobrik, Matty Benedetto	N/A	"She's Country" by Jason Aldean
Summer Staycation
