= The Kelly Clarkson Show season 4 =

The Kelly Clarkson Show
- Season 4
- Starring: Kelly Clarkson
- No. of episodes: 162

Release
- Original network: Syndication
- Original release: September 12, 2022 – June 12, 2023

Season chronology
- ← Previous; Season 3 Next → Season 5

The fourth season of The Kelly Clarkson Show began airing on September 12, 2022.

== Notes ==
- During the tapings in early December, Clarkson tested positive for COVID-19 and had to quarantine and host from home. She also had guest hosts while quarantining.
- "Have Yourself a Merry Little Christmas" in episode 62 (December 12) was performed by guest Jewel, marking the first time that a Kellyoke performance does not feature Kelly Clarkson. However, Kelly already performed the song in episode 58 (December 11, 2020) of the second season.

== Episodes ==
No. overall	No. in season	Original release date	Guest(s)	Musical/entertainment guest(s)	"Kellyoke" cover / "Kellyoke" Classic
541	1	September 12, 2022	Kenan Thompson, Garth Brooks	N/A	Premiere Medley
Premiere Medley: "On the Road Again" by Willie Nelson/"Music" by Madonna/"Freeway of Love" by Aretha Franklin/"Welcome to New York" by Taylor Swift
542	2	September 13, 2022	Lester Holt, D'Arcy Carden, Karamo Brown	N/A	"Losing My Mind"
543	3	September 14, 2022	Hillary Clinton, Chelsea Clinton, Tracy Morgan, Maven Morgan	N/A	"Just Fine" by Mary J. Blige
544	4	September 15, 2022	Lin-Manuel Miranda, Ozuna, Angie Martinez	Sebastián Yatra	"Más o menos antes" by Silvana Estrada
Hispanic Heritage Month Kickoff
545	5	September 16, 2022	Markella Kavenagh, Benjamin Walker, Sophia Nomvete, Nazanin Boniadi, Lloyd Owen, Ismael Cruz Córdova, Alex Guarnaschelli	N/A	"Dog Days Are Over" by Florence + the Machine
546	6	September 19, 2022	Blake Shelton, Tyra Banks, Raymond Lee	N/A	"Make It Rain" by Ed Sheeran
547	7	September 20, 2022	Gabrielle Union, Dwyane Wade, Jurnee Smollett, Danielle Kartes	N/A	"I Don't Feel Like Dancin'" by Scissor Sisters
548	8	September 21, 2022	Olivia Wilde, Jo Koy	N/A	"Simply Irresistible" by Robert Palmer
549	9	September 22, 2022	Jon Hamm, Roy Wood Jr.	Jessie Baylin	"Ring My Bell" by Anita Ward
550	10	September 23, 2022	Cynthia Erivo, Wells Adams, Daniele Uditi	N/A	"When You Wish Upon a Star"
551	11	September 26, 2022	Scarlett Johansson, Guy Branum, Lawrence Zarian	N/A	"Breathe" by Faith Hill
552	12	September 27, 2022	Elisabeth Moss, Noah Cyrus	N/A	"Survivor" by Destiny's Child
553	13	September 28, 2022	Rosie O'Donnell, Tyler James Williams	Fitz and the Tantrums	"Bye, Bye" by Jo Dee Messina
554	14	September 29, 2022	Billy Eichner, Luke Macfarlane, Jim Rash, Symone	N/A	"Summer of Love" by Shawn Mendes & Tainy
555	15	September 30, 2022	Topher Grace, Kelsea Ballerini	Kelsea Ballerini	"Jeremiah" by Sierra Ferrell
556	16	October 3, 2022	Gwen Stefani, Melissa Villaseñor	N/A	"Astronaut in the Ocean" by Masked Wolf
557	17	October 4, 2022	Beth Behrs, Max Greenfield, Camila Alves	Silvana Estrada	"Waiting for Tonight" by Jennifer Lopez
558	18	October 5, 2022	Jill Biden, LeVar Burton	N/A	"I Got You (I Feel Good)" by James Brown
Salute to Teachers Hour
559	19	October 6, 2022	Mila Kunis, Chiara Aurelia, Jessica Knoll	Tink	"If You Don't Know Me by Now" by Simply Red
Luckiest Girl Alive Hour
560	20	October 7, 2022	Constance Wu, Kit Hoover	N/A	"That's What I Like About You" by Trisha Yearwood
561	21	October 10, 2022	Connie Britton, Sarah Shahi, Stephanie Izard	Chris Tomlin	"Ain't It Fun" by Paramore
562	22	October 11, 2022	Sam Smith, Jacob Anderson	N/A	"Breakaway" by Kelly Clarkson
International Day of the Girl; "Breakaway" performed with Sam Smith
563	23	October 12, 2022	Jay Leno, Ayo Edebiri, Dylan Hollis	N/A	"traitor" by Olivia Rodrigo
564	24	October 13, 2022	Chelsea Handler, Lindsey Vonn, Wolfgang Puck	N/A	"Queen of the Night" by Whitney Houston
565	25	October 14, 2022	Marlon Wayans, Priah Ferguson, Silvia Martinez	N/A	"Let Me Down Slowly" by Alec Benjamin feat. Alessia Cara
566	26	October 17, 2022	Dwayne Johnson, Pierce Brosnan, Aldis Hodge, Noah Centineo, Quintessa Swindell	N/A	"Don't Come Home A-Drinkin' (With Lovin' on Your Mind)" by Loretta Lynn
"Don't Come Home a Drinkin' (With Lovin' on Your Mind)" performed with Dwayne Johnson
567	27	October 18, 2022	Jessica Chastain, Ryan Phillippe	N/A	"What a Fool Believes" by The Doobie Brothers
568	28	October 19, 2022	Eddie Redmayne, Emily Deschanel, Dara Yu, Liz Parker	N/A	"Don't Come Lookin'" by Jackson Dean
569	29	October 20, 2022	Margaret Cho, Richard Marx	Richard Marx	"Jumper" by Third Eye Blind
570	30	October 21, 2022	Kerry Washington, Charlize Theron, Sofia Wylie, Sophia Anne Caruso, Paul Feig, Soman Chainani, Guy Branum	N/A	"Angel of Mine" by Monica
571	31	October 24, 2022	Lena Dunham, Fortune Feimster	N/A	"Baby, I Love Your Way" by Peter Frampton
572	32	October 25, 2022	Quinta Brunson, Sheryl Lee Ralph, Lisa Ann Walter, Kate Flannery, Shane Victorino	N/A	"How Do I Live" by LeAnn Rimes
573	33	October 26, 2022	Michael Ealy, Jennifer Tilly	N/A	"My Boo" by Ghost Town DJ's
574	34	October 27, 2022	Khloé Kardashian, Michael Ray, Jade Catta-Preta	Michael Ray	"The Middle" by Jimmy Eat World
575	35	October 28, 2022	Josh Duhamel, Sosie Bacon, Antonia Lofaso, Chad Kroeger, JT Parr	N/A	"Black Hole Sun" by Soundgarden
576	36	October 31, 2022	Rose McIver, Loni Love, Kristin Hensley, Jen Smedley	N/A	"Monster Mash" by Bobby Pickett
Halloween
577	37	November 1, 2022	Joe Manganiello, Casey Wilson, Danielle Schneider, Stephanie Izard	N/A	"Put Your Records On" by Corinne Bailey Rae
578	38	November 2, 2022	Selena Gomez, Ming Tsai, Najee Harris	N/A	"Someone Else Is Steppin' In" by Z.Z. Hill
579	39	November 3, 2022	JB Smoove, Aimee Garcia, Duff Goldman	Courtney Marie Andrews	"Alibis" by Tracy Lawrence
580	40	November 4, 2022	George Lopez, Mayan Lopez, Alison Sweeney	Jake Miller	"I'm So Into You" by SWV
581	41	November 7, 2022	Angela Bassett, Raymond Lee, Lindsey Stirling	Lindsey Stirling	"Umbrella" by Rihanna
582	42	November 8, 2022	Terry Bradshaw, Brandon Kyle Goodman, Claybourne Elder	Mergui	"'Til You Can't" by Cody Johnson
583	43	November 9, 2022	Kristen Bell, Anna Diop, Candace Nelson	Panic! at the Disco	"California Dreamin'" by The Mamas & the Papas
584	44	November 10, 2022	Luke Grimes, Wes Bentley, Walker Hayes	Walker Hayes	"Lady Marmalade" by Labelle (Christina Aguilera, Lil' Kim, Mya, P!nk version)
585	45	November 11, 2022	Jonathan Majors, Craig Morgan	82nd Airborne Division Choir	"Heavy in Your Arms" by Florence + The Machine
Veterans Day
586	46	November 14, 2022	Kyle Chandler, Ruby Bridges, Garth Brooks	N/A	"Dream a Little Dream of Me"
587	47	November 15, 2022	Lauren Graham, Mo Amer	The Black Keys	"We Found Love" by Rihanna & Calvin Harris
588	48	November 16, 2022	Tim Allen, Elizabeth Allen-Dick, Misty Copeland	N/A	"Rumour Has It" by Adele
589	49	November 17, 2022	Mindy Kaling, Dove Cameron, Giada De Laurentiis, Chris Colfer	Noah Kahan	"Only Happy When It Rains" by Garbage
590	50	November 21, 2022	Ryan Reynolds, Will Ferrell, Octavia Spencer, Angela Bassett	N/A	"Seven Nation Army" by The White Stripes (Rerun)
Guest Host: Sunita Mani
591	51	November 22, 2022	Christina Jackson, Jana Kramer, Jonathan Majors, Alex Aster	N/A	"Better Now" by Post Malone (Rerun)
Guest Host: Mario Lopez
592	52	November 28, 2022	Sarah Hyland, Natasha Leggero, Courtney Rich	N/A	"Let's Hear It for the Boy" by Deniece Williams
593	53	November 29, 2022	Chloë Grace Moretz, Matt Rogers	P1Harmony	"Stupid Love" by Lady Gaga
594	54	November 30, 2022	Annaleigh Ashford, Murray Bartlett, Quentin Plair, Guy Branum	N/A	"Juice" by Lizzo (Rerun)
Guest Host: Kumail Nanjiani
595	55	December 1, 2022	Dolly Parton	N/A	"9 to 5" by Dolly Parton (second era)
"9 to 5" performed with Dolly Parton
596	56	December 2, 2022	Cher	Reneé Rapp	"I Got You Babe" by Sonny & Cher (Rerun)
Home for the Holidays
597	57	December 5, 2022	Idina Menzel, Theo James, Asi Wind, Carson Daly	49 Winchester	"It's Raining Men" by The Weather Girls
598	58	December 6, 2022	Nia Long, Regina Hall, Taye Diggs, Melissa De Sousa	N/A	"Finesse" by Bruno Mars & Cardi B (Rerun)
Home for the Holidays; Guest Co-Host: Morris Chestnut
599	59	December 7, 2022	Zoey Deutch, Mike Rowe, Jeannie Mai	N/A	"Found Out About You" by Gin Blossoms
600	60	December 8, 2022	Christina Applegate, Lee Rosbach, Gabriella Baldacchino, Lilliana Vazquez	Sunset West	"Hopelessly Devoted to You" by Olivia Newton-John (Rerun)
Home for the Holidays
601	61	December 9, 2022	Catherine Zeta-Jones, Matt Iseman, Lisette Olivera, Danielle Kartes	N/A	""You Don't Know Me" (Cindy Walker song)" by Jann Arden
602	62	December 12, 2022	Jewel, Andrea Savage	Jewel	"Have Yourself a Merry Little Christmas"
Home for the Holidays; "Have Yourself a Merry Little Christmas" performed by Jewel
603	63	December 13, 2022	Amy Poehler, Gabriel LaBelle, Tamera Mowry-Housley	Samara Joy	"Merry Christmas (To the One I Used to Know)" by Kelly Clarkson
604	64	December 14, 2022	Brendan Fraser, Sadie Sink	N/A	"Christmas Isn't Canceled (Just You)" by Kelly Clarkson
605	65	December 15, 2022	Michelle Obama, Matt Iseman	Pentatonix, Meghan Trainor	"Santa, Can't You Hear Me" by Kelly Clarkson & Ariana Grande (first era)
Rad Mom Christmas
606	66	December 16, 2022	Linda Cardellini, Poppy Montgomery, Angie Thomas, Nicola Yoon	N/A	"I'll Be Home for Christmas" by Bing Crosby
Holiday Week
607	67	December 19, 2022	Anna Kendrick, Jordan L. Jones, Duff Goldman	Coco Jones	"Sisters"
Holiday Show; "Sisters" performed with Jessi Collins
608	68	December 20, 2022	Michelle Obama, Dolly Parton, Amy Poehler	Matthew West	"Last Christmas" by Wham! (Rerun)
Kelly Extra ... Helping of Christmas!
609	69	January 2, 2023	Margot Robbie, Diego Calva, Dwayne Johnson, Ingrid Andress	Ingrid Andress, Sam Hunt	"The Warrior" by Scandal feat. Patty Smyth
New Me in '23
610	70	January 3, 2023	Kit Hoover, Frida Gustavsson, Kelly Rizzo, Jude Kofie	N/A	"The One That Got Away" by Katy Perry
New Me in '23
611	71	January 4, 2023	Alexandra Daddario, Justin Guarini	Tauren Wells	"Honey Bee" by Blake Shelton
New Me in '23
612	72	January 5, 2023	Mario Lopez, Ellie Bamber, Danielle Kartes	N/A	"Lost In The Fifties Tonight" by Ronnie Milsap
New Me in '23
613	73	January 6, 2023	Allison Williams, Folake Olowofoyeku, Kena Peay	N/A	"Ordinary World" by Duran Duran
New Me in '23
614	74	January 9, 2023	Terry Crews, Jackie Shultz, Emily Kaufman	N/A	"Sucker" by Jonas Brothers (Rerun)
Guest Host: Howie Mandel
615	75	January 10, 2023	Ernie Hudson, Melia Kreiling, Susan Sarich	Jessica Betts	"Good as Hell" by Lizzo (Rerun)
Guest Host: Niecy Nash
616	76	January 11, 2023	Andie MacDowell, Whitney Peak, Brad Meltzer, Scarlett Johansson, Deon Cole	N/A	"All the Small Things" by Blink-182
617	77	January 12, 2023	Marlee Matlin, Tyler Posey, Jeremy Rosado	Jeremy Rosado	"Didn't I" by Kelly Clarkson
618	78	January 13, 2023	Nick Jonas, Wendy Raquel Robinson	N/A	"I'll Take You There" by The Staple Singers
619	79	January 16, 2023	Cedric the Entertainer, Pam Grier, Bernice King, Questlove, Veda Tunstall	N/A	"Unforgettable" by Nat King Cole
620	80	January 17, 2023	Jenna Dewan, Sam Jay, Jillian Michaels	Aoife O'Donovan, Allison Russell	"Come Out and Play (Keep 'Em Separated)" by The Offspring
621	81	January 18, 2023	Rob Lowe, Marcus Scribner	N/A	"Glimpse of Us" by Joji
622	82	January 19, 2023	Bryan Cranston, Rita Wilson, Katie Chin	N/A	"Lady in Red" by Chris de Burgh
623	83	January 20, 2023	Marcia Gay Harden, Storm Reid, Lucius	Lucius	"You Should Probably Leave" by Chris Stapleton
624	84	January 23, 2023	Jane Fonda, Lily Tomlin, Sally Field, Rita Moreno, Stephen A. Smith	N/A	"Better Man (Taylor's Version)" by Taylor Swift
625	85	January 24, 2023	Emma Roberts, Ramón Rodríguez	Nickelback	"She Drives Me Crazy" by Fine Young Cannibals
626	86	January 25, 2023	Kate Walsh, Randy Jackson, Paul Rabil	N/A	Umbrella" by Rihanna (Rerun)
627	87	January 26, 2023	Benjamin Bratt, Nikki Glaser, Emily Kaufman	N/A	"Everything She Ain’t" by Hailey Whitters
628	88	January 27, 2023	Seal, Ava Max, Becky Lynch, Courtney Rich	Seal	"Finally" by CeCe Peniston
629	89	January 30, 2023	Hilary Duff, Benjamin Levy Aguilar	Drake Milligan	"Do I Wanna Know?" by Arctic Monkeys
630	90	January 31, 2023	Anthony Anderson, Iliza Shlesinger, Noah Galuten	Sam James	"Take Yo' Praise" by Camille Yarbrough
631	91	February 1, 2023	Jay Ellis, Karamo Brown	MAJOR.	"Survivor" by Destiny's Child (Rerun)
632	92	February 2, 2023	Shania Twain, The BoykinZ, Chris Powell	N/A	"Return of the Mack" by Mark Morrison
633	93	February 3, 2023	Craig Robinson, Alex Weekes, Julian McClurkin	N/A	"Dandelions" by Ruth B.
634	94	February 6, 2023	P!nk	P!nk	"Breathe Again" by Joy Oladokun
Songs & Stories Hour
635	95	February 7, 2023	Alison Brie, Michael Bolton, Michael Irvin	N/A	"Set Fire to the Rain" by Adele
636	96	February 8, 2023	Rose Byrne, Harry Hamlin	Lukas Graham, Mickey Guyton	"Here I Go Again" by Whitesnake
637	97	February 9, 2023	Salma Hayek Pinault, Dylan Gilmer, Stephen A. Smith	N/A	"1999" by Prince
638	98	February 10, 2023	Alyssa Milano, Macklemore	Kranium	"Tennessee Whiskey" by Chris Stapleton (Encore)
639	99	February 13, 2023	Cara Delevingne, Nicholas Sparks	Jordy	"Where Is My Mind?" by Pixies (Encore)
640	100	February 14, 2023	Ashton Kutcher, Chrissy Metz, Bradley Collins	N/A	"Dance Around It" by Lucius featuring Brandi Carlile and Sheryl Crow
Love Is All Around Us Hour
641	101	February 15, 2023	Evangeline Lilly, Jonathan Daviss, Kelly Gray, Vernard Hodges, Terrence Ferguson, Stephen A. Smith	N/A	"Family Tradition" by Hank Williams Jr.
642	102	February 16, 2023	Joel McHale, Danielle Pinnock, Regina Sanz, Corey Ward	Corey Ward	"Falling Slowly" by Glen Hansard & Markéta Irglová
"Falling Slowly" performed with Corey Ward
643	103	February 17, 2023	Derek Hough, Jay Hernandez	Derek Hough	"Strong Enough" by Cher
644	104	February 20, 2023	Babyface	Babyface	"Fly Away" by Lenny Kravitz
Songs & Stories Hour
645	105	February 21, 2023	Jane Lynch, Bozoma Saint John, Kevin Jonas	N/A	"Better Days" by Dermot Kennedy
646	106	February 22, 2023	Niall Horan, Kimberly Williams-Paisley, Mika Brzezinski	N/A	"Fade into You" by Mazzy Star
647	107	February 23, 2023	Keri Russell, O'Shea Jackson Jr., Brynn Cartelli	Brynn Cartelli	"Peacefully" by GEMS
648	108	February 24, 2023	Eugene Levy, Gina Torres, Hisham Tawfiq	Jonathan McReynolds	"Reunited" by Peaches & Herb
649	109	February 27, 2023	Anthony Mackie, Madison Bailey, Xscape, SWV	N/A	"Stay Away" by Muna
650	110	February 28, 2023	Brendan Fraser, Jenny Slate	N/A	"1979" by The Smashing Pumpkins
651	111	March 1, 2023	Jay Leno, Novi Brown, Hannah Fry	N/A	"Blue" by Ingrid Andress
652	112	March 2, 2023	Chris Pratt, Jack Black, Keegan-Michael Key, Charlie Day	Meet Me @ The Altar	"In the Meantime" by Spacehog
Super Mario Bros.
653	113	March 3, 2023	Riley Keough, Suki Waterhouse, Camila Morrone, Taylor Jenkins Reid	Sunny War	"You Are a Tourist" by Death Cab for Cutie
654	114	March 13, 2023	DJ Cassidy, Chance the Rapper, Angie Martinez	N/A	"She Wants to Move" by N.E.R.D.
50 Years of Hip-Hop
655	115	March 14, 2023	Ike Barinholtz, Sarah Ferguson, Twice	Twice	"Rebel Yell" by Billy Idol (Rerun)
656	116	March 15, 2023	Seth Rogen, Jessica Williams, Meena Harris	N/A	"My Life" by Billy Joel
657	117	March 16, 2023	Zachary Levi, Lainey Wilson, Hannah Fry	Lainey Wilson	"Somethin' Stupid" by Frank Sinatra & Nancy Sinatra
"Somethin' Stupid" performed with Zachary Levi
658	118	March 17, 2023	Helen Mirren, Adam Brody, Aly & AJ	Aly & AJ	"Pick Up Your Feelings" by Jazmine Sullivan
659	119	March 20, 2023	Wilmer Valderrama, Scott Hoying, Kate the Chemist	Scott Hoying	"Free" by Florence + the Machine
660	120	March 21, 2023	Djimon Hounsou, Miranda Cosgrove, Chance the Rapper	N/A	"Gotta Get Thru This" by Daniel Bedingfield
661	121	March 22, 2023	Chrissy Teigen, Matt Iseman, Lukas Gage, James L. Nederlander, Jenny Lumet	Easton Corbin	"When I Think of You" by Janet Jackson
662	122	March 23, 2023	Keanu Reeves, Lance Reddick, Ian McShane, Shamier Anderson, Hiroyuki Sanada, Chad Stahelski, Emily Kaufman	N/A	"Are You Gonna Go My Way" by Lenny Kravitz
663	123	March 27, 2023	Jeff Goldblum, Chase Stokes, Megan Piphus	Jeff Goldblum & the Mildred Snitzer Orchestra	"It Ain't Over 'til It's Over" by Lenny Kravitz
It's a Mad, Mad, Mad March
664	124	March 28, 2023	Christina Ricci, Melissa Rauch	Magic Mike Live	"(I Just) Died in Your Arms" by Cutting Crew
It's a Mad, Mad, Mad March
665	125	March 29, 2023	Juliette Lewis, Ben Napier, Erin Napier, Montana Tucker	N/A	"Salt Water" by Raveena Aurora
It's a Mad, Mad, Mad March
666	126	March 30, 2023	Michelle Rodriguez, Sophia Lillis, John Edward, Ike Barinholtz	Myke Towers	"ABCDEFU" by Gayle
It's a Mad, Mad, Mad March
667	127	March 31, 2023	Kevin Bacon, Kyra Sedgwick, John Owen Lowe, Bianca Belair, Cody Rhodes	N/A	"That's All" by Genesis
It's a Mad, Mad, Mad March
668	128	April 3, 2023	Ben Affleck, Matt Damon, Chris Tucker	N/A	"Young Hearts Run Free" by Candi Staton
669	129	April 4, 2023	Nicole Byer, Toheeb Jimoh, Danielle Kartes	N/A	"American Woman" by The Guess Who (Lenny Kravitz version)
670	130	April 5, 2023	Mario Lopez, Brooke Shields, Echo Kellum, Pamela Bowman	N/A	"A Case of You" by Joni Mitchell
671	131	April 6, 2023	Ana Gasteyer, Phil Dunster	Devon Gilfillian	"Best of My Love" by The Emotions
672	132	April 10, 2023	Awkwafina, Charles Esten	Charles Esten	"Glory Days" by Bruce Springsteen
"Glory Days" performed with Charles Esten
673	133	April 11, 2023	Helen Hunt, Jodie Turner-Smith, Dwayne Johnson, Pierce Brosnan, Aldis Hodge, Noah Centineo, Quintessa Swindell	N/A	"Brown Eyed Girl" by Van Morrison
674	134	April 12, 2023	Utkarsh Ambudkar, Kathleen Madigan	N/A	"Clean" by Taylor Swift
675	135	April 13, 2023	Ali Wong, Cassandra Freeman, Mika Brzezinski	N/A	"Don't You (Forget About Me)" by Simple Minds
676	136	April 17, 2023	Giancarlo Esposito, Brandon Scott Jones, Priyanka Naik	Hailey Whitters	"Can't Pretend" by Tom Odell
677	137	April 18, 2023	Henry Winkler, Melissa Barrera, Brian Hart Hoffman, Kay Adams	Jackson Dean	"Mine" by Kelly Clarkson
678	138	April 19, 2023	Kristin Chenoweth, Khris Davis, Jude Kofie	Matchbox Twenty	"Faithfully" by Journey
679	139	April 20, 2023	Julianne Hough, Michael Carbonaro, Danielle Kartes	Mckenna Grace	"La Bamba"
680	140	April 21, 2023	Jake Gyllenhaal, Matt Iseman, Daveed Diggs	Ian Munsick	"Magic" by Coldplay
681	141	April 24, 2023	Jimmie Allen, The BoykinZ, Jude Kofie, Micayla De Ette	N/A	"I Know" by Dionne Farris
The Gift of Music Hour: Kelly's Birthday Show
682	142	April 25, 2023	Meghan Trainor, Daryl Sabara, Tom Pelphrey, Jeremy Ford, Lawrence Zarian	N/A	"Human" by Rag'n'Bone Man
683	143	April 26, 2023	Carol Burnett	Colbie Caillat	"Alive" by Empire of the Sun
Carol's Scrapbook: 90 Years of Entertaining the World
684	144	April 27, 2023	Rachel McAdams, Abby Ryder Fortson, Judy Blume	The Heavy	"The Only Exception" by Paramore
Are You There God? It's Me, Kelly: A Judy Blume Hour
685	145	April 28, 2023	Bebe Rexha, Oliver Stark, Troye Sivan	Bebe Rexha	"Slow" by Rumer
686	146	May 1, 2023	Pierce Brosnan, Elle King, Gesine Bullock-Prado, Lawrence Zarian	N/A	"Since U Been Gone" by Kelly Clarkson
"Since U Been Gone" performed with Lorna Courtney of & Juliet.
687	147	May 2, 2023	Kate Mara, Jane Goodall, Ava Louise Murchison, Susan Sarich	N/A	"New York Minute" by Don Henley
688	148	May 3, 2023	Joshua Jackson, Christine Ko, Kristen Kish	N/A	"A Special Place" by Danielle Bradbery
689	149	May 4, 2023	Rachel Brosnahan, Alex Borstein, Tony Shalhoub, Michael Zegen, Carey Hart, Andrea Pett-Joseph	Thee Sacred Souls	"Wicked Game" by Chris Isaak (Rerun)
690	150	May 5, 2023	Ryan Seacrest, Matt Iseman, Taylor Hicks, India Amarteifio, Arsema Thomas, Corey Mylchreest	Taylor Hicks	"A-O-K" by Tai Verdes (Rerun)
691	151	May 9, 2023	Priyanka Chopra Jonas, Maks Chmerkovskiy, Val Chmerkovskiy	Maks Chmerkovskiy, Emily Crouch	"Bridge over Troubled Water" by Simon & Garfunkel
692	152	May 11, 2023	Jane Fonda, Candice Bergen, Diane Keaton, Mary Steenburgen	Caitlyn Smith	"Somebody Told Me" by The Killers
Book Club
693	153	May 15, 2023	Vin Diesel, Quentin Plair	N/A	"Can't Get You Out Of My Head" by Kylie Minogue (Rerun)
694	154	May 17, 2023	Ken Jeong, Charlie Day, Alex Cooper	N/A	"Feels Like Home" by Randy Newman
695	155	May 18, 2023	Garth Brooks	N/A	"Maneater" by Hall & Oates
696	156	May 22, 2023	Adam Richman, Stephanie Izard, Anne Burrell, Maneet Chauhan	N/A	"Yours" by Russell Dickerson
Kelly's Summer Cookout
697	157	May 23, 2023	Shawn Seipler, Alesha Brown, Martin Schwartz, AJ Jefferson, Tyrique Glasgow, Josué González	N/A	"If He Wanted to He Would" by Kylie Morgan
Good Neighbor of the Year, Part 1
698	158	May 30, 2023	Hannah Waddingham, Reid Scott, Emily Kaufman	N/A	"All Around the World" by Lisa Stansfield
699	159	June 1, 2023	Seal, Niall Horan, Shania Twain, Ava Max	Grace Gaustad	"Falling Slowly" by Glen Hansard & Markéta Irglová (Rerun)
The Power of Music Hour; "Falling Slowly" performed with Corey Ward (Rerun)
700	160	June 5, 2023	Sterling K. Brown, Jaren Lewison, Tanya Holland	N/A	"Sorry" by Justin Bieber (Rerun)
701	161	June 8, 2023	Eva Longoria, Annie Gonzalez, Jesse Garcia	Colton Dixon	"Can't Stop" by Red Hot Chili Peppers
702	162	June 12, 2023	Margot Robbie, Issa Rae, Kate McKinnon, America Ferrera, Lawrence Zarian	N/A	"Pure Imagination" by Fiona Apple
Barbie Dream Hour
