= The Kelly Clarkson Show season 3 =

US TV show (2021–2022)

The Kelly Clarkson Show
- Season 3
- Starring: Kelly Clarkson
- No. of episodes: 180

Release
- Original network: Syndication
- Original release: September 13, 2021 – June 29, 2022

Season chronology
- ← Previous; Season 2 Next → Season 4

The third season of The Kelly Clarkson Show began airing on September 13, 2021.

== Episodes ==
No. overall	No. in season	Original release date	Guest(s)	Musical/entertainment guest(s)	"Kellyoke" cover / "Kellyoke" Classic
361	1	September 13, 2021	Fat Joe, Kristin Chenoweth, Chris Martin, Bowen Yang	N/A	"On Top of the World" by Imagine Dragons
We Love NY Week
362	2	September 14, 2021	Tracy Morgan, Julia Haart	N/A	"Ain't No Mountain High Enough" by Marvin Gaye & Tammi Terrell
We Love NY Week
363	3	September 15, 2021	Tim Gunn, Connie Britton, Maury Povich, Connie Chung	N/A	"Valerie" by Mark Ronson & Amy Winehouse
We Love NY Week
364	4	September 16, 2021	Amber Ruffin, Julianne Moore, Ben Platt, Amandla Stenberg, Amy Adams, Nik Dodani, Danny Pino, Angie Martinez	N/A	"What's Love Got to Do with It?" by Tina Turner
We Love NY Week
365	5	September 17, 2021	Seth Meyers, Kandi Burruss	N/A	"Cry Me a River" by Julie London
We Love NY Week
366	6	September 20, 2021	Ariana Grande, Glennon Doyle, James Wolk, Danielle Nottingham	N/A	"Two Princes" by Spin Doctors
We Love LA Week
367	7	September 21, 2021	Matt Iseman, Ken Jeong, Charli D'Amelio, Dixie D'Amelio, Marc D'Amelio, Heidi D'Amelio	N/A	"Escapade" by Janet Jackson
We Love LA Week
368	8	September 22, 2021	Alyson Hannigan, Shaquille O'Neal, Dan Reynolds	N/A	"Fool for You" by Snoh Aalegra
We Love LA Week
369	9	September 23, 2021	Arsenio Hall, Kristen Bell, Kirby Howell-Baptiste, Jeanie Buss, Chris Kattan	N/A	"Make Me Feel" by Janelle Monáe
We Love LA Week
370	10	September 24, 2021	Big Boy, Whitney Cummings, Jonathan Scott, Drew Scott, Andrea Pitter	Chris Martin	"You Love Me" by Kelly Clarkson
We Love LA Week
371	11	September 27, 2021	50 Cent, Glenn Howerton, Trisha Yearwood	Itzy	"Enjoy the Silence" by Depeche Mode
372	12	September 28, 2021	Melissa McCarthy, Sydney Sweeney, Lawrence Zarian	Patrick Droney	"My Own Worst Enemy" by Lit
373	13	September 29, 2021	Joseph Gordon-Levitt, Hannah Waddingham, Tia Mowry	Maeta	"River" by Leon Bridges
374	14	September 30, 2021	Leslie Jones, Sarah Shahi	Elton John and Charlie Puth	"Happier Than Ever" by Billie Eilish
375	15	October 1, 2021	Demi Lovato, Kathy Hilton	N/A	"Saving All My Love for You" by Whitney Houston
376	16	October 4, 2021	Fortune Feimster, New Kids on the Block, En Vogue, Salt-N-Pepa, Rick Astley	New Kids on the Block	"Step by Step/Whatta Man/Hangin' Tough"
New Kids on the Block Hour
377	17	October 5, 2021	Stanley Tucci, JoJo Siwa, Cristo Fernández	Chris Young and Mitchell Tenpenny	"If I Ever Lose My Faith in You" by Sting
378	18	October 6, 2021	Barry Manilow, Marque Richardson, Logan Browning, Cynthia Bailey, Zyra Gorecki, Simone Biles, Jordan Chiles	2Cellos	"Save the Best for Last" by Vanessa Williams
379	19	October 7, 2021	Shannen Doherty, Brendan Hunt	N/A	"Wild West" by Lissie
380	20	October 8, 2021	LL Cool J	Melissa Etheridge	"Tightrope" by Kelly Clarkson
381	21	October 11, 2021	Beth Behrs, Deidre Hall, Robert Scott Wilson, Tamyra Mensah-Stock	Maisie Peters	"Let's Go to Vegas" by Faith Hill
International Day of the Girl
382	22	October 12, 2021	Selma Blair, Kyle Richards, Daymond John	Old Dominion	"Real Love" by Mary J. Blige
383	23	October 13, 2021	Jamie Lee Curtis, Hasan Minhaj, Malia Baker	Natalie Hemby	"Mama Said" by The Shirelles
384	24	October 14, 2021	Heather Locklear, J.B. Smoove, Elaine Welteroth, Lawrence Zarian, Becca Stevens	N/A	"Dreams" by Beck
385	25	October 15, 2021	David Duchovny, Ms. Pat, Soman Chainani	Aespa, Leland Sklar	"Let's Dance" by David Bowie
Ambush Christmas
386	26	October 18, 2021	Ava DuVernay, Annabeth Gish, Suni Lee	Amy Grant	"It's Your Thing" by The Isley Brothers
387	27	October 19, 2021	Clint Howard, Ron Howard, Melissa Benoist	Scotty McCreery	"Crash into Me" by Dave Matthews
388	28	October 20, 2021	Erin Andrews, Freida Pinto, Courtney Rich, Abigail Barlow & Emily Bear	Parmalee	"Heart of Glass" by Blondie
389	29	October 21, 2021	Jimmy Fallon, Karla Souza, Amir Arison, Silvia Navas, Elba Argueta	Static & Ben El Tavori	"I Got You Babe" by Sonny & Cher
"I Got You Babe" performed with Jimmy Fallon
390	30	October 22, 2021	Dave Grohl, David Chang, Priya Krishna	Abigail Breslin	"Maybe" by Kelly Clarkson
391	31	October 25, 2021	Sara Gilbert, Priyanka Naik, Michael Corriero, Patricia DiMango, Tanya Acker	The Band CAMINO	"Call Out My Name" by The Weeknd
392	32	October 26, 2021	Chrissy Teigen, Joy Mangano	The Marias	"Viva La Vida" by Coldplay
393	33	October 27, 2021	Cynthia Erivo, John Pollono, Big Lux	Cynthia Erivo	"River Deep, Mountain High" by Ike & Tina Turner
394	34	October 28, 2021	Eugene Levy, Loretta Devine, Theodore Leaf, Caitlyn Smith	Caitlyn Smith	"Karma Police" by Radiohead
395	35	October 29, 2021	Meghan Trainor, Mckenna Grace, Ernie Hudson, Jennifer Houghton, Gary Trainor	N/A	"Ghostbusters" by Ray Parker Jr.
Halloween Hour
396	36	November 1, 2021	Dr. Aqeel Dix, Imani Lamarr, Josh Longoria, Leon Logothetis, Alexander Lloyd Blake, Abby Anderson, Chris Anderson, Ja'Dayia Kursh, Antonina Barry	N/A	"Pavement Cracks" by Annie Lennox
Rad Human Hour
397	37	November 2, 2021	Jane Lynch, Kate Flannery, Phoebe Robinson, D Smoke, Shermann "Dilla" Thomas	Jane Lynch and Kate Flannery	"Home" by Michael Buble (Blake Shelton version)
398	38	November 3, 2021	Emily Osment, Lea Michele	Lea Michele	"Ring of Fire" by Johnny Cash (Rerun)
Guest Host: Jay Leno
399	39	November 4, 2021	Hailee Steinfeld, Jamie Oliver, Matthias Schweighofer	Jordan McGraw	"I Love the Way You Love Me" by John Michael Montgomery
400	40	November 5, 2021	Anna Kendrick, Michael Imperioli, Steve Schirripa, Duff Goldman	Tito Jackson, Michael Ray	"Hit 'Em Up Style (Oops!)" by Blu Cantrell
401	41	November 8, 2021	Ed Sheeran, Max Greenfield, Ben Vereen, Ally Maki	Reba McEntire	"Bad Habits" by Ed Sheeran
402	42	November 9, 2021	Salma Hayek, Lauren Ridloff	N/A	"You Ain't Much Fun" by Toby Keith
403	43	November 10, 2021	Kal Penn, Yung Bleu, Lawrence Zarian	Leland Sklar, Yung Bleu	"You've Got a Friend" by Carole King
404	44	November 11, 2021	Phil McGraw, Tamera Mowry	Zac Brown Band	"Welcome to the Black Parade" by My Chemical Romance
Veterans Day Show
405	45	November 12, 2021	Julia Jones, Marcus Samuelsson, Rod Stewart	Rod Stewart	"If I Can't Have You" by Kelly Clarkson
406	46	November 15, 2021	Cynthia Bailey, Luann de Lesseps, Teresa Giudice, Ramona Singer, Kenya Moore	Candiace Dillard Bassett	"Stop This Flame" by Celeste
407	47	November 16, 2021	Deon Cole, Cody Rigsby, Bobby Berk	N/A	"Ooh Laa" by John Legend
408	48	November 17, 2021	Channing Tatum, Jamie Dornan, Alexandra Shipp, Brandon Maxwell, Lawrence Zarian, James Pearse Connelly	NCT 127	"Meet Me at Our Spot" by THE ANXIETY, Tyler Cole, & Willow
409	49	November 18, 2021	Harry Shearer, Zooey Deschanel, Jen Smedley, Kristin Hensley, Emily Kaufman	Derek Smalls	"Gimme Some Money" by Spinal Tap
Another Rad Mom Hour
410	50	November 19, 2021	Mindy Kaling, Logan Shroyer, Linda Brown	Maná	"I'll Think of a Reason Later" by Lee Ann Womack
411	51	November 22, 2021	Kirsten Dunst, Brooke Shields, Winnie Yee-Lakhani, Lawrence Zarian	N/A	"Lady Like" by Ingrid Andress
412	52	November 23, 2021	Lin-Manuel Miranda, Matt Iseman, Ana Gasteyer, Rachel Dratch	ENHYPEN	"Rebel Yell" by Billy Idol
413	53	November 24, 2021	Machine Gun Kelly, Nikki Glaser	Alessia Cara	"Fake Plastic Trees" by Radiohead
414	54	November 29, 2021	Jeremy Renner, Jennifer Tilly, Jesús Morales	N/A	"Where Is My Mind?" by Pixies
415	55	November 30, 2021	Darren Criss, Paula Patton, Lawrence Zarian, Natalie Pasquarella, Danny Casale	Darren Criss and Adam Lambert	"Pride and Joy" by Stevie Ray Vaughan
Giving Tuesday
416	56	December 1, 2021	Kristin Chenoweth, Diego Boneta, Benny Blanco, Matty Matheson, Jeffrey Bowyer-Chapman	Kristin Chenoweth	"Blue Bayou" by Linda Ronstadt (Rerun)
Guest Host: Jay Leno
417	57	December 2, 2021	Taraji P. Henson, Celina Smith, Matt Iseman, Lang Lang	Lang Lang	"Who Are You When I'm Not Looking" by Blake Shelton
418	58	December 3, 2021	Cheryl Hines, Hannah Brown, Sarah Wilson	Benson Boone	"7 Rings" by Ariana Grande
419	59	December 6, 2021	Nicole Byer, Courtney Rich, Jody Carroll, Keith Urban	Keith Urban	"More Than a Feeling" by Boston
420	60	December 7, 2021	Sterling K. Brown, Jessica Seinfeld, Lawrence Zarian	N/A	"You're No Good" by Linda Ronstadt
421	61	December 8, 2021	Sandra Bullock, Yvonne Orji, Tan France	Robert Plant and Alison Krauss	"The Trouble With Love Is" by Kelly Clarkson
422	62	December 9, 2021	Chrissy Metz, Eugenio Derbez, CL, Rachel Montez Minor, Steph Johnson, Debbie Blount	CL	"There's Your Trouble" by Dixie Chicks
423	63	December 10, 2021	Nick Offerman, Ariana DeBose, Duff Goldman	Rob Thomas	"Breath of Heaven (Mary's Song)" by Amy Grant
Holiday Celebration
424	64	December 13, 2021	Andy Cohen, Tori Kelly	She & Him	"Christmas Come Early" by Kelly Clarkson
Holiday Celebration
425	65	December 14, 2021	Zachary Levi, Kurt Warner, Brenda Warner, Marie Osmond, The Grinch	Marie Osmond and Daniel Emmet	"Merry Christmas Baby" by Kelly Clarkson
Holiday Celebration
426	66	December 15, 2021	Chloë Grace Moretz, Aisling Bea	Tasha Cobbs Leonard	"Last Christmas" by Wham!
Holiday Celebration
427	67	December 16, 2021	Keanu Reeves, Carrie-Anne Moss, Steve Vaus	Jake Hoot and The Tenors	"The Christmas Song"
Holiday Celebration
428	68	December 17, 2021	Jewel, Demi Singleton, Saniyya Sidney, Mary Kean	Maddie Poppe	"Blessed" by Kelly Clarkson
Holiday Celebration
429	69	December 20, 2021	Tom Holland, Zendaya, Jacob Batalon, Julia Minichiello, The Trills	Dan + Shay	"Leave the Door Open" by Silk Sonic
Holiday Celebration
430	70	January 3, 2022	Ben Affleck, Tye Sheridan, Daniel Ranieri, Adam Glenn, Joel Sartore	Christina Perri	"You Make My Dreams" by Hall & Oates
431	71	January 4, 2022	Kym Whitley, Antonia Lofaso	Leland Sklar	"Another Day in Paradise" by Phil Collins
Single Parent's Appreciation Hour
432	72	January 5, 2022	Lily Collins, Josie Totah, Jane Golden	Tenille Arts	"Forever Young" by Rod Stewart
433	73	January 6, 2022	Gordon Ramsay, Cheryl Burke, Lynne Kahn	Eric Bellinger	"Both Sides, Now" by Joni Mitchell
434	74	January 7, 2022	Ciara Renée, Mayim Bialik, Meagan Good, Jay Leno	Cody Johnson	"She Used to Be Mine" by Sara Bareilles
435	75	January 10, 2022	Joel McHale, Storm Reid	Caroline Jones	"The End of the World" by Sharon Van Etten
436	76	January 11, 2022	Leslie Jones, Chris Martin, Melissa McCarthy, Deon Cole, Jimmy Fallon, Max Greenfield, Bowen Yang	N/A	"Kiss" by Prince (Rerun)
Prince and Other Stories Worth Saving
437	77	January 12, 2022	Josh Gad, Emily Kaufman	Milky Chance	"Hands Clean" by Alanis Morissette
438	78	January 13, 2022	Neve Campbell, Melissa Barrera, Ghostface, Lawrence Zarian, Nadia Popovici, Brian Hamilton, Kathleen Fitzpatrick	N/A	"working" by Tate McRae & Khalid
439	79	January 14, 2022	Kristin Davis, Mason Gooding, Steve Boettcher	Amos Lee	"Angel of the Morning" by The Pretenders
440	80	January 17, 2022	Morris Chestnut, Fortune Feimster, Stephanie Izard	Sing Harlem	"Someone" by Kelly Clarkson
Martin Luther King Jr. Day
441	81	January 18, 2022	Alyssa Milano, Rose McIver, Dr. Jane Haven	Keb' Mo'	"Crazy" by Aerosmith
442	82	January 19, 2022	Milo Ventimiglia, Alana Haim	N/A	"Take My Breath" by The Weeknd
443	83	January 20, 2022	Valerie Bertinelli, Chris Kattan	Matteo Bocelli	"Adia" by Sarah McLachlan
444	84	January 21, 2022	Randall Park, Ed Helms, Karen Pittman, Vanna White	N/A	"Love Tonight" by Shouse
445	85	January 25, 2022	Janet Jackson, Lacey Chabert, Autumn Reeser, Alison Sweeney, Syncopated Ladies	Syncopated Ladies	"What Have You Done For Me Lately" by Janet Jackson
446	86	January 27, 2022	Julie Bowen, Colman Domingo, John Jones Jr., John Jones III	Warren Zeiders	"Saving All My Love for You" by Whitney Houston (Rerun)
Guest Host: Jay Leno
447	87	January 28, 2022	Ike Barinholtz, Francia Raisa, Danielle Kartes	N/A	"I Drove All Night" by Celine Dion
448	88	January 31, 2022	Kunal Nayyar, Alan Ritchson, Katsuji Tanabe	N/A	"Karma Police" by Radiohead (Rerun)
Guest Host: Derek Hough.
449	89	February 1, 2022	Taylor Lautner, Porsha Williams	N/A	"Don't Dream It's Over" by Crowded House
450	90	February 2, 2022	Johnny Knoxville, Rachel Wolfson, Abigail Cowen	N/A	"Two Princes" by Spin Doctors (Rerun)
Guest Host: Jay Leno.
451	91	February 3, 2022	Tim McGraw, Isabel May, Eliza Coupe	N/A	"More Hearts Than Mine" by Ingrid Andress
452	92	February 7, 2022	Charlie Puth, Troy Aikman	N/A	"Arcade" by Duncan Laurence
Super Bowl Hour
453	93	February 8, 2022	Kristen Bell, Quinta Brunson, Tanisha Hall	N/A	"Heartache Tonight" by The Eagles
454	94	February 9, 2022	Kumail Nanjiani, Donald Williams, Jason Y. Lee	N/A	"Viva La Vida" by Coldplay (Rerun)
Guest Host: Simu Liu.
455	95	February 10, 2022	Charlie Day, Jenny Slate, Katie Lowes, Malik Yoba, Devon Harris, Jet Tila	N/A	"Breadwinner" by Kacey Musgraves
456	96	February 11, 2022	Kenneth Branagh, Annette Bening, Tara Lipinski	Travis	"Double Take" by Dhruv
457	97	February 14, 2022	Chelsea Handler, Jo Koy, Emily Kaufman	N/A	"Alone" by Kelly Clarkson
Valentine's Day Hour
458	98	February 15, 2022	Doug Ducey, Terri Irwin, Bindi Irwin, Robert Irwin	Angélique Kidjo	"Make Me Feel" by Janelle Monáe (Rerun)
Guest Host: Taraji P. Henson.
459	99	February 16, 2022	Adam Scott, Ryan Michelle Bathe, Lawrence Zarian	Anais Mitchell	"Happier" by Marshmello & Bastille
460	100	February 17, 2022	Channing Tatum, Caitríona Balfe, Priscilla Block	Priscilla Block	"A-O-K" by Tai Verdes
461	101	February 18, 2022	Rachel Brosnahan, Suraj Sharma	Maverick City Music	"Boot Scootin' Boogie" by Brooks & Dunn
462	102	February 21, 2022	Michael Ealy, Chloe Kim, Brie and Nikki Bella	N/A	"I Wanna Get Better" by Bleachers
463	103	February 22, 2022	Mandy Moore, Aida Rodriguez, Kwame Onwuachi, Jason Gray-Stanford	Ricky Dillard	"Only Love Can Hurt Like This" by Paloma Faith
464	104	February 23, 2022	Hilary Duff, Jabari Banks, Anne Thorward	Daisy the Great featuring AJR	"Faith" by George Michael
465	105	February 24, 2022	Whitney Cummings, Katie Couric, Maggie Q, Donny Osmond	Donny Osmond	"Better Class of Losers" by Randy Travis
466	106	February 25, 2022	Tyler Perry, Parker Young	N/A	"99 Red Balloons" by Nena
467	107	February 28, 2022	Kit Hoover, Justin Cunningham, Danielle Kartes	Carlie Hanson	"Love Takes Time" by Mariah Carey
468	108	March 1, 2022	Eric Stonestreet, Britt Lower	N/A	"Shivers" by Ed Sheeran
469	109	March 2, 2022	Brad Meltzer	N/A	"I Just Called to Say I Love You" by Stevie Wonder
Salute to Reading Hour
470	110	March 3, 2022	Colin Farrell, Stephanie Izard, Avril Lavigne	Avril Lavigne, blackbear and Travis Barker	"Chasing Cars" by Snow Patrol
471	111	March 4, 2022	Greg Kinnear, Ashley Park, Lindsey Stirling, Karolina Protsenko	Lindsey Stirling & Karolina Protsenko	"Here Comes the Rain Again" by Eurythmics
472	112	March 14, 2022	Dolly Parton, James Patterson, Regina Hall, Brittany Snow, Ludo Lefebvre, Claire Sulmers	Brooke Ligertwood	"Jolene" by Dolly Parton
473	113	March 15, 2022	Renée Zellweger, Judy Greer, Bobby Moynihan	Bryan Adams	"Nostalgic" by Kelly Clarkson
474	114	March 16, 2022	Amanda Seyfried, Kyle MacLachlan, Rhett & Link	Jon Pardi	"Free" by Rudimental feat. Emeli Sandé
475	115	March 17, 2022	Seth Meyers, Marlee Matlin, Emilia Jones, Troy Kotsur, Daniel Durant, Eugenio Derbez	N/A	"In the Blue" by Kelly Clarkson
476	116	March 18, 2022	Jamie Dornan, Dominique Fishback	For King & Country	"Better Things to Do" by Terri Clark
477	117	March 21, 2022	Nikolaj Coster-Waldau, Addison Rae, Lawrence Zarian	John Holiday	"Judas" by Kelly Clarkson
478	118	March 22, 2022	Anne Hathaway, Matt Iseman, Louisa Jacobson	Chris Janson	"Tonight I Wanna Cry" by Keith Urban
479	119	March 23, 2022	Jeff Foxworthy, Tinashe, Tinx, Olivia Edward	Tinashe	"I Gotta Feeling" by Black Eyed Peas
480	120	March 24, 2022	Daniel Radcliffe, Youn Yuh-Jung, Nicole Remy	N/A	"Rescue" by Lauren Daigle
481	121	March 28, 2022	Jessica Alba, Rose Matafeo	Jamie Miller	"Lovely" by Billie Eilish & Khalid
482	122	March 29, 2022	Michael Bublé, Randy Jackson	Michael Bublé	"High Horse" by Kacey Musgraves
483	123	March 30, 2022	Brian Tyree Henry, Lana Condor, Cole Sprouse, Lisa Ann Walter	Jake Scott	"Almost Doesn't Count" by Brandy
484	124	March 31, 2022	Lisa Kudrow, Julia Haart, DeVaughn Nixon	Laura Marano and Grey	"Son of a Preacher Man" by Dusty Springfield
485	125	April 4, 2022	Judd Apatow, Leslie Mann, Iris Apatow, Maria Bakalova, Keegan-Michael Key	Sophia Scott	"Dancing in the Street" by Martha and the Vandellas
486	126	April 5, 2022	Vanessa Hudgens, Utkarsh Ambudkar, E.G. Daily, Jon Yeager, Lindsay Yeager	AJ Smith	"Vincent" by Don McLean
487	127	April 6, 2022	Nick Carter, Howie Dorough, AJ McLean, Brian Littrell, Kevin Richardson, Taylor Tomlinson, Desz	Desz	"Show Me the Meaning of Being Lonely" by Backstreet Boys
488	128	April 7, 2022	Mayim Bialik, Chrishell Stause	N/A	"Dancing Queen" by ABBA
489	129	April 8, 2022	Idris Elba, Jonas Brothers, Millicent Simmonds, Emily Simmonds	Blake Shelton	"Footloose" by Kenny Loggins
490	130	April 11, 2022	Angela Bassett, Kel Mitchell, Nyesha Arrington	N/A	"Show Me What I'm Looking For" by Carolina Liar
491	131	April 12, 2022	Ted Danson, Natasha Rothwell	Ben Rector	"Castles" by Freya Ridings
492	132	April 13, 2022	Camila Cabello, Shemar Moore, Craig Morgan	N/A	"Leave Before You Love Me" by Marshmello & Jonas Brothers
493	133	April 14, 2022	Kate Hudson, Oliver Hudson, Alisha Wainwright, Dave Roberts	N/A	"half of my hometown" by Kelsea Ballerini & Kenny Chesney
494	134	April 18, 2022	Mike Epps, Rachel Bloom, Lisa Whelchel	Ben Abraham	"Don't Stop Believin'" by Journey
'80s week
495	135	April 19, 2022	Josh Brolin, Tony Gonzalez, Sabaa Tahir, Malala Yousafzai	N/A	"I Ran (So Far Away)" by A Flock of Seagulls
'80s week
496	136	April 20, 2022	Jenna Bush Hager, Barbara Bush, Ke Huy Quan	Cole Swindell & Lainey Wilson	"Get Down on It" by Kool & The Gang
'80s week
497	137	April 21, 2022	Bonnie Raitt, Adam Richman, Da'Vine Joy Randolph	Bonnie Raitt	"I Wouldn't Have Missed It for the World" by Ronnie Milsap
'80s week
498	138	April 22, 2022	Nathan Fillion, Alyssa Diaz, Melissa O'Neil, Eric Winter, Mekia Cox, Michael Ealy, Machine Gun Kelly, Rick Astley	Rick Astley	"Edge of Seventeen" by Stevie Nicks
Kelly's Birthday Show
499	139	April 25, 2022	Colin Hanks, Lucy Boynton, Jewel	Jewel	"All I Ever Wanted" by Kelly Clarkson
500	140	April 26, 2022	Nicolas Cage, Ms. Pat, Duff Goldman, Lawrence Zarian	N/A	"Exit Music (For a Film)" by Radiohead
501	141	April 27, 2022	Tom Selleck, Monét X Change, Shea Couleé, Raja Gemini, Yvie Oddly, Michelle Zauner	Japanese Breakfast	"I'm No Stranger to the Rain" by Keith Whitley
502	142	April 28, 2022	Kaley Cuoco, Zosia Mamet, Henry Winkler	N/A	"Never Again, Again" by Lee Ann Womack
503	143	April 29, 2022	Laura Linney, Gabriel Iglesias	PJ Morton	"Narcissist" by Avery Anna
504	144	May 2, 2022	Lily Tomlin, Jane Fonda, Sasheer Zamata	N/A	"Breathe Again" by Toni Braxton
505	145	May 3, 2022	Phil McGraw, Nikki Glaser, Damaris Phillips	Jesse McCartney	"Cold Heart" by Elton John & Dua Lipa
506	146	May 4, 2022	Jake Johnson, Natasha Leggero, Jackson Wang	N/A	"King of Wishful Thinking" by Go West
507	147	May 5, 2022	Manuel Godoy, Geiszel Godoy, Carolina Hernandez, Richard Casper, Jesse Wayne Taylor, Dan Hebert, Andre Rush, Steve Dilley, Tonya Savice, Gina Elise	Jesse Wayne Taylor	"Falling" by Harry Styles
Salute To Veterans Hour
508	148	May 6, 2022	Benedict Cumberbatch, Elizabeth Olsen, Xochitl Gomez, Benedict Wong	N/A	"Beautiful" by Christina Aguilera
Teacher Appreciation Hour
509	149	May 9, 2022	Minnie Driver, Kaci Walfall	N/A	"How Soon Is Now" by The Smiths
Rad Moms Week
510	150	May 10, 2022	Jessica Biel, Susan Kelechi Watson, Leanne Morgan	5 Seconds of Summer	"The Way You Move" by Outkast & Sleepy Brown
Rad Moms Week
511	151	May 11, 2022	Michelle Pfeiffer, Dakota Fanning, Dulé Hill, Rick Springfield	Rick Springfield	"Peter Pan" by Kelsea Ballerini
Rad Moms Week
512	152	May 12, 2022	Tiffany Haddish, Samson Kayo, Danielle Kartes, AleXa	N/A	"No Roots" by Alice Merton
Rad Moms Week
513	153	May 13, 2022	Bobby Brown, Alicia Etheredge-Brown, Melissa Rivers, Courtney Rich	N/A	"Jealous" by Labrinth
Rad Moms Week
514	154	May 16, 2022	Cameron Diaz, Ryan Eggold, Jazmyn Simon, Ann Wilson	Ann Wilson	"Almost Paradise" by Mike Reno & Ann Wilson
515	155	May 17, 2022	Niecy Nash, Bill Rancic, Giuliana Rancic, Sheryl Crow	Sheryl Crow	"Heartbreak Anthem" by Galantis, David Guetta & Little Mix
516	156	May 18, 2022	Idina Menzel, Talia Suskauer, Craig Wich, Mark O'Brien, Abigail Barlow & Emily Bear	Barlow & Bear	"In My Mind" by John Legend
517	157	May 19, 2022	Alanis Morissette, Joe Alwyn	Harper Grae	"Here Comes the Rain Again" by Eurythmics (Rerun)
518	158	May 20, 2022	Emmy Rossum, Joyelle Johnson	N/A	"River" by Joni Mitchell
519	159	May 23, 2022	Paul Rudd, Jean Smart, Allen Leech	Meghan Linsey	"Real Love" by Mary J. Blige (Rerun)
520	160	May 24, 2022	Jenna Fischer, Angela Kinsey, JoJo Siwa, Joshua Weissman	N/A	"Cry to Me" by Solomon Burke
521	161	May 25, 2022	Nick Jonas, Robert Herjavec, Regina Sanz	Tears for Fears	"Raining on Sunday" by Keith Urban
522	162	May 31, 2022	Simon Cowell, Terry Crews, Heidi Klum, Sofía Vergara, Matt Benedetto	Tomorrow X Together	"Uninvited" by Alanis Morissette
523	163	June 1, 2022	Charithra Chandran, Nicola Coughlan, Adjoa Andoh, Joel Kim Booster, Adria Arjona	N/A	"Smoky Mountain Rain" by Ronnie Milsap
524	164	June 2, 2022	Seth MacFarlane, Margaret Cho, Rex Chapman, Nataly Kogan	N/A	"Georgia on My Mind" by Ray Charles
525	165	June 6, 2022	Matt Iseman, The Chicks	The Chicks	"Gaslighter" by The Chicks (Rerun)
526	166	June 7, 2022	Sam Heughan, Ms. Pat	N/A	"Careless Whisper" by George Michael
527	167	June 8, 2022	June Diane Raphael, Jessica St. Clair, Sasheer Zamata, Nicole Byer	N/A	"Save Your Tears" by The Weeknd & Ariana Grande
National Best Friends Day
528	168	June 9, 2022	Chris Pratt, Bryce Dallas Howard, Jeff Goldblum, DeWanda Wise, Mamoudou Athie, Brad Meltzer	N/A	"Happier Than Ever" by Billie Eilish (Rerun)
529	169	June 13, 2022	Curtis Stone, Ming Tsai, Dominique Crenn, Gabriela Cámara, Marcus Samuelsson	N/A	"Stop Draggin' My Heart Around" by Stevie Nicks & Tom Petty
Iron Chef University Hour
530	170	June 14, 2022	Faith Hill, Kelsey Asbille, Danielle Kartes	Black Opry	"I'm Still Standing" by Elton John
531	171	June 15, 2022	Melissa McCarthy, Ben Falcone, Leslie Bibb, Kevin Dunn	Taylor Bennett	"Womanizer" by Britney Spears
532	172	June 16, 2022	Hailey Bieber, Anitta	Kang Daniel	"Call Out My Name" by The Weeknd (Rerun)
533	173	June 17, 2022	Joel McHale	N/A	"Under the Bridge" by Red Hot Chili Peppers
Rad Dad Hour
534	174	June 20, 2022	Anna Chlumsky, Cam, Anjelah Johnson-Reyes	Blessing Offor	"Crash Into Me" by Dave Matthews (Rerun)
Guest Host: Jay Leno
535	175	June 21, 2022	Howie Mandel, Iman Vellani, Maren Morris	N/A	"RSVP" by Maren Morris
536	176	June 22, 2022	Rainn Wilson, Shane West	Saleka	"Anyone" by Demi Lovato
537	177	June 23, 2022	Austin Butler, Chris Daughtry	Daughtry	"Whole Lotta Woman" by Kelly Clarkson
538	178	June 27, 2022	Backstreet Boys, New Kids on the Block, Michael Bublé, Randy Jackson, Dan Reynolds, Avril Lavigne	N/A	"Escapade" by Janet Jackson (Rerun)
Music & My Band Y'all
539	179	June 28, 2022	Shannon Payton, Mari Ebert, Janet Udomratsak, Simone Gordon, Miriam Weiskind, Tom Hill, Kaneesha Leach-Petelo, AJ Petelo, Lisa Suhay	N/A	"Ironic" by Alanis Morissette
IRL Update Hour
540	180	June 29, 2022	Maury Povich, Connie Chung, Ed Helms, Randall Park, Jo Koy, Chelsea Handler, Charlie Day, Jenny Slate, Katie Lowes, Ron Howard, Clint Howard	N/A	"Leave the Door Open" by Silk Sonic (Rerun)
"Perfect Pairs" Hybrid
