= Gravity Payments =

Financial services company

Gravity Payments, Inc.
- Type: Private
- Founded: Seattle, Washington, February 2004
- Headquarters: Ballard, Seattle, Washington, United States
- Key people: Dan Price, co-founder
- Products: Credit card processing
- Number of employees: 240
- Website: gravitypayments.com

Gravity Payments is a credit card processing and financial services company. It was founded in 2004 by Dan Price. The company is headquartered in the Ballard neighborhood of Seattle, Washington and employs 240 people. As of November 2021, Dan Price is the only shareholder and the only member of the board of directors.

The company received media attention in 2015 when CEO Dan Price announced that his employees at the Seattle office would receive a minimum salary of $70,000. In September 2019, Price issued an additional increase of $10,000 to all employees in the Boise office, with salaries increasing every year until 2023, when it would reach $70,000. In August 2022, the company's minimum salary was $80,000 per year.

== History ==
Gravity Payments was co-founded in February 2004 by brothers Lucas and Dan Price. By June 2008, the company was the largest credit card processor in Washington, and the 70th-ranked nationally.

In 2013, Dan increased pay for all employees earning less than $100,000 by 20%, as a response to the lapse of the Middle Class Tax Relief and Job Creation Act of 2012. The company also provides unlimited paid time off to employees. Repeated pay increases resulted in "surprising" productivity jump from 30% to 40%, as did overall company profits. The company faced harsh criticism from Fox News and Rush Limbaugh who said he hoped the company would become "a case study in MBA programs on how socialism does not work, because it's gonna fail".

In April 2015, Dan announced that over the next three years, the company would raise the pay of all employees to at least $70,000 per year, stating this was the minimum needed to secure them from financial hardship in the event of unexpected expenses. Price, who previously paid himself a $1 million yearly salary, cut his own salary down to $70,000 to partially cover the increased pay for employees. The change lost the company two long-standing employees due to the flat payment structure. Price quoted Daniel Kahneman's research on salaries as inspiration.

In October 2015, Dan was sued by Lucas over claims that Dan received excessive compensation and that he had been working against Lucas' interests. Dan prevailed in the case in July 2016 and was awarded attorney's fees and other expenses incurred from the lawsuit.

The company processed $3.4 billion in payments in 2014 and $10.2 billion in 2018.

In 2015 it had 91% employee retention rate (with industry average of 68%). Customer retention rate increased from 91% to 95% and company profits have doubled.

In 2020, the company was making $4 million per month in revenue but faced a drop of 55% in card processing fees as a result of the COVID-19 pandemic. The company said that employees proposed voluntary pay cuts to preserve employment, although 10 employees later told The Seattle Times that employees were given a choice to take a pay cut or face layoffs, and those who opposed the pay cut felt ostracized. As of August 2020, layoffs had been avoided and workers' salaries had been restored, with the company paying back the salaries lost from the pay cuts.

Dan Price, who had pleaded not guilty to misdemeanor charges of assault and reckless driving in May 2022, resigned as Gravity's CEO on August 17. Tammi Kroll, the company's chief operating officer, replaced him. The charges were dismissed in 2023. In May 2024, Price announced that he had returned to Gravity "in a new role advising and assisting the CEO on strategy."
