= Dan Price =

American entrepreneur and businessman (born 1984)

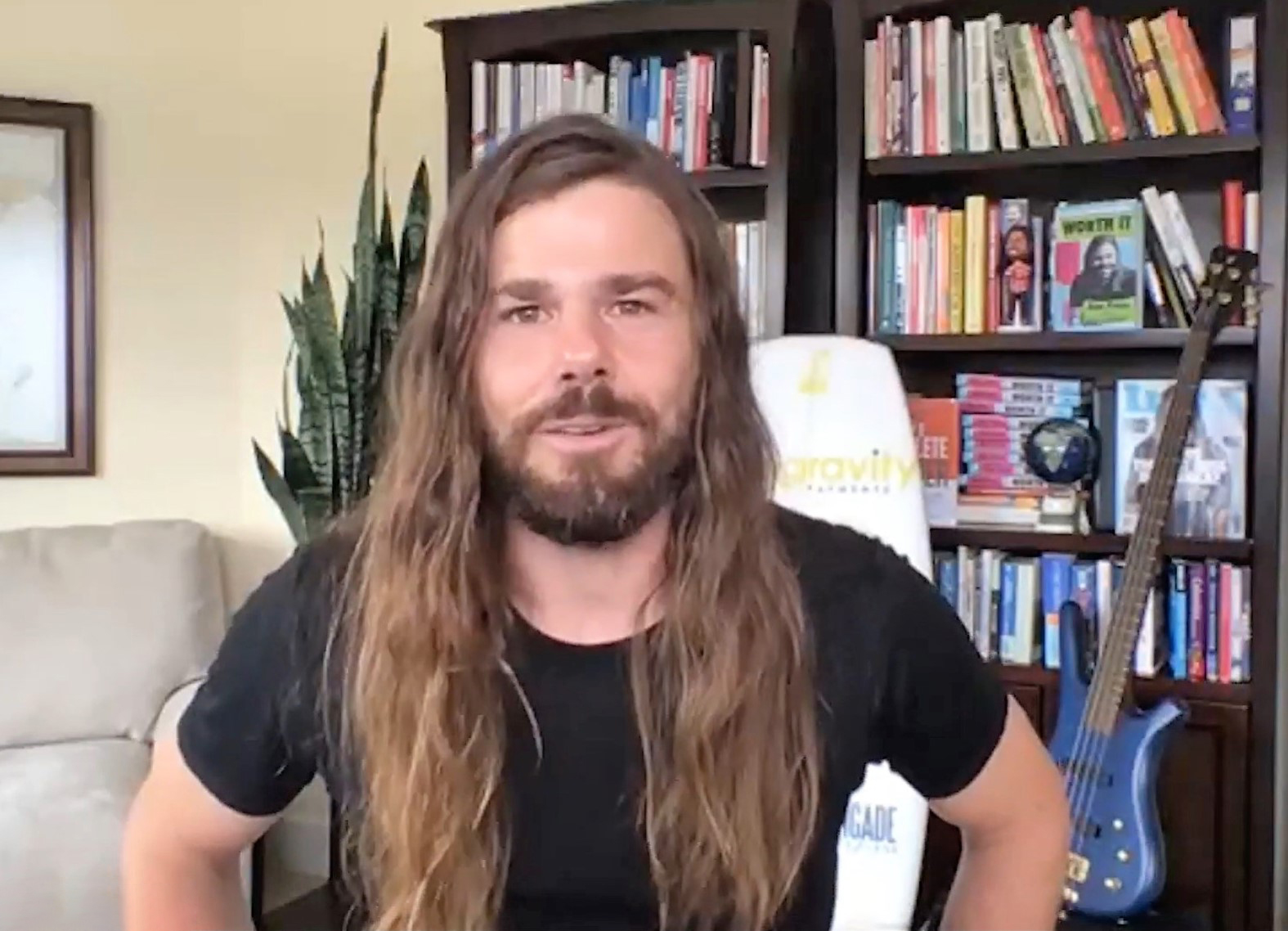
- Price in 2021
- Born: May 13, 1984 (age 42); Lansing, Michigan, United States
- Education: Seattle Pacific University
- Occupations: Entrepreneur; businessman; media personality
- Spouse: Kristie Colón (née Lewellyn) (m. 2005; div. 2012)

Daniel Joseph Price (born May 13, 1984) is an American entrepreneur, businessman, and media personality. He is the co-founder and former chief executive officer of Gravity Payments, a credit card processing and financial services company, of which he is the sole shareholder and board member.

Price gained recognition in 2015 after raising the minimum salary for Gravity Payments employees to $70,000 and lowering his own wage from $1.1 million to $70,000. He has been active on social media, especially Twitter, where his posts have been widely shared.

== Early life and education ==
Daniel Joseph Price was born on May 13, 1984, in Lansing, Michigan. His father, Ron Price, worked as a business consultant and public speaker. He is the fourth of six children and was raised in an Evangelical Christian household. When he was young, his family moved to Nampa, Idaho, where he was homeschooled until the age of 12.

Price attended and graduated from Nampa Christian High, a private school. While in high school, he joined a Christian punk rock band called Straightforword, playing bass guitar. After the owner of a coffee shop where the band regularly performed complained of high credit card processing fees, Price said he was able to negotiate the fees down for the owner. His father was working in the credit card industry at the time and Price began to assist him. Price then focused on launching a credit card processing business instead of pursuing music. Price moved to Seattle to attend Seattle Pacific University (SPU). He graduated from SPU in 2008.

== Career ==
=== Business ===
In 2004, while a student at Seattle Pacific University, Dan Price, 19, started Price & Price as a merchant-services company along with his older brother, Lucas Price, 24. Lucas provided the seed money for the venture and was the original majority owner of the company. Dan became CEO in 2006. The brothers renegotiated their ownership stake in 2008 and renamed the company Gravity Payments.

On March 16, 2015, Price was served with a lawsuit initiated by his brother Lucas. The lawsuit alleged that Dan Price was overpaying himself and engaging in minority shareholder oppression. Price was accused of freezing Lucas out of major business decisions for their company in violation of their 2008 agreement to have two-person board meetings. In July 2016, the lawsuit filed by Lucas Price was concluded when King County Superior Court Judge Theresa B. Doyle ruled in favor of Dan Price on all counts.

On April 13, 2015, with reporters from The New York Times and NBC News in attendance, Price told Gravity Payments staff that he was raising the company's minimum salary to $70,000 and reducing his own compensation from $1.1 million to $70,000. The story quickly went viral. Price cited "High income improves evaluation of life but not emotional well-being," a 2010 paper by Daniel Kahneman and Angus Deaton of Princeton University, as motivation for his choice of the $70,000 minimum. The company said that employees contributed to buy a Tesla for Price as a show of gratitude, but two experienced employees in Gravity's marketing department later said that Price himself came up with the Tesla gift idea, and no Gravity employees saw a reduction in their wages to pay for Price's car. The salary move also triggered a backlash, including from Rush Limbaugh and from some Gravity Payments clients who accused Price of communist or socialist motives. Two Gravity Payments employees resigned in protest.

Price later admitted that some of the statements he made to the press about how he funded the wage raise at Gravity Payments were not true. He told Inc. in an interview for a November 2015 cover story that he sold all his stocks, emptied his retirement accounts, and mortgaged two properties he owned, obtaining $3 million, which he put into Gravity Payments. "I wanted a larger margin for error," Price told CNN, explaining that the additional funding was related to his promised minimum wage increase. Property records searches showed that Price had not mortgaged his homes at that time, and he acknowledged this in a February 2016 court filing. Price later mortgaged one of his properties in March 2016. Price told The New York Times in July 2015, "I'm renting out my house right now to make ends meet for myself." In August 2016, he told the Today show that he only rents his home during the summer and that his decision was not made solely out of financial necessity.

Price reported in March 2020 that the pay raise has worked well for his company in particular, but he hesitated to call it a full success because income inequality in the broader world has continued to grow. He extended the same minimum wage to all employees of ChargeItPro, a company Gravity Payments acquired in 2019. Price resigned as Gravity Payments CEO on August 17, 2022, telling employees that he needed to step aside from his CEO role to "focus full time on fighting false accusations made against me." Tammi Kroll, Gravity Payments' chief operating officer, replaced Price as CEO. On May 28, 2024, Price announced that he had returned to Gravity "in a new role advising and assisting the CEO on strategy."

=== Other ventures ===
In 2015, Price accepted a $500,000 book deal to be published via Viking Press. He planned to write about the establishment of Gravity Payments and about socially conscious business. Price lost the book deal, and his representation by the talent agency WME, after a Bloomberg Businessweek article in December 2015 reported that his ex-wife had accused him of domestic violence.

Price has made frequent use of social media to post liberal-leaning critiques about socioeconomic issues. Some of his posts were widely shared as Internet memes. Most of his posts were ghostwritten by Mike Rosenberg, a former reporter for The Seattle Times who was suspended from his job in 2019 after revelations that he sent sexually explicit messages to another journalist.

Price's first book, Worth It, was self-published in April 2020. In September 2020, he tweeted, "52% of young adults now live with their parents, the highest rate ever, surpassing even the Great Depression. The most educated (and most in debt) generation in history did everything they were supposed to and got this. The system. Does. Not. Work." The post went viral a year later; one instance of it was shared over 15,000 times. USA Today fact-checked the tweet and found it to be accurate as of its original posting date, although out of context; the COVID-19 pandemic was responsible for the sudden spike in this figure. One of Price's tweets, about Dick's Drive-In's high wages and low prices, was shared over 70,000 times.

Price accused Twitter of "shadow muting" his account in June 2021, noting an over 90% decrease in tweet impressions and profile views, month over month. In July 2021, Price posted on LinkedIn in favor of work from home, saying that introverts benefit from it.

In March 2022, Facebook flagged a screen shot of a Price Twitter post about oil company profits, which had gone viral on its platform, as part of its efforts to combat misinformation. PolitiFact wrote that Price's tweet was "mostly true," stating that "while it was correct in its assertion that oil companies have recorded record profits, it ignored that those gains followed pandemic-era losses."

== Reception ==
In 2010, Price was honored as the National SBA Young Entrepreneur of the Year and was invited to the White House to meet President Barack Obama. He won GeekWire's Young Entrepreneur of the Year award in 2013. Entrepreneur magazine named him Entrepreneur of 2014.

After the pay raise announcement, Price became a celebrity, making numerous television and magazine cover appearances, and reportedly earning at least $10,000 per public speaking appearance. Writing for Esquire magazine, Natasha Zarinsky called him "a folk hero for the age of inequality." Bernie Sanders appeared with Price on MSNBC and later tweeted, "At a time of massive wealth and income inequality in our country, Mr. Price set an example others should learn from." Robert Reich, the former United States Secretary of Labor, called Price "the one moral CEO in America" in a speech about the immorality of capitalism. An Upworthy article in November 2021 began, "Dan Price is the go-to example for business done right."

== Personal life ==
Price resides in the Magnolia neighborhood of Seattle, Washington. He was married to Kristie Colón (née Lewellyn) from 2005 until their divorce in 2012. The Netline reported that the couple married "after Dan's Christian parents demanded that they marry or end their relationship." Though he was raised in an Evangelical Christian household, he has stated that he no longer is a practicing Christian and doesn't follow any particular religion.

=== Legal issues ===
In 2013, Price entered an Irish pub in Seattle, sat at a table of people he did not know, and was asked to leave. After the bar's manager escorted him out, Price allegedly assaulted the manager. Price was arrested and charged. The charges were later dismissed.

In October 2015, Price's ex-wife Kristie Colón recorded a TEDx talk at the University of Kentucky in which she alleged that Price threw, punched, slapped, body-slammed and waterboarded her while they were married. Price's representatives notified the university that they considered Colón's remarks to be defamatory. The university later deleted its video footage of Colón's talk and deleted information about her from the TEDx event's web site. Price denied her claims of abuse, said the events Colón described never happened, and said that his wife never filed a police report. Price's father denied Colón's accusations in an interview with the Idaho Statesman in December 2015. In January 2016, Colón published a blog post standing by her accusations.

In April 2022, Price was under investigation by the Palm Springs Police Department for felony rape of a drugged victim stemming from an April 2021 incident in Palm Springs, California. On August 15, 2022, Palm Springs Police told The New York Times that they had referred the case to local prosecutors. In September 2024, Price was charged in Riverside County Superior Court with rape of an unconscious victim. "I have never physically or sexually abused anyone. I’m going to fight this charge and prove my innocence in court," said Price on October 25, 2024, a day after the court records were unsealed. On May 27, 2025, The New York Times reported that the Riverside County District Attorney's office had dropped the rape charges against Price. According to the alleged victim, the prosecutors told her that "it was too much of a 'he said, she said' case," although she noted that the grand jury had believed that there was enough evidence to go to trial.

In February 2022, Price was charged with misdemeanor assault, misdemeanor assault with sexual motivation, and reckless driving after a 26-year-old woman accused Price of forcibly attempting to kiss her. The woman also told police that Price was driving while intoxicated. Price's attorney issued a statement denying the woman's claims. The assault with sexual motivation charge was later dropped; Price pleaded not guilty to the other two charges on May 31. Price resigned as CEO of Gravity Payments on August 17, 2022, to focus on fighting the charges against him. On April 19, 2023, a city court dismissed the remaining charges without prejudice. Price announced on May 28, 2024, that he had returned to work at Gravity Payments in an advisory role.

== Bibliography ==
- Price, Dan. Worth It: How a Million-Dollar Pay Cut and a $70,000 Minimum Wage Revealed a Better Way of Doing Business (2020) ISBN 978-1734157215
