= Kate Biberdorf =

Popular science communicator

- Education: University of Michigan (BS); University of Texas, Austin (MS, PhD)
- Scientific career
- Institutions: University of Texas at Austin
- Thesis: Direct comparison of homogeneous and heterogeneous palladium(II) catalysts for Suzuki-Miyaura cross-coupling reactions (2014)
- Website: Kate the Chemist website

Katherine Alexis Biberdorf (née Crawford), also known as Kate the Chemist, is a popular science communicator and professor of chemistry at the University of Notre Dame. She serves as the Professor of Public Understanding of Science at Notre Dame.

== Early life and education ==
Biberdorf was born in Kalamazoo, Michigan. She became interested in chemistry during high school, and her mother encouraged her to try out different experiments at home.

Biberdorf earned her undergraduate degree at the University of Michigan, where she majored in chemistry and German. Biberdorf completed her doctorate in inorganic chemistry at the University of Texas at Austin (UT Austin) in 2014. Her research considered heterogeneous catalysis for Suzuki-Miyaura coupling. She became involved with undergraduate teaching, and enjoyed getting young people excited about chemistry. After completing her PhD, she was teaching faculty at UT Austin between 2014 and 2024. She was appointed professor of chemistry and Professor of Public Understanding of Science at the University of Notre Dame in September 2024.

== Career ==
Dr. Kate Biberdorf holds the newly established position of Professor for the Public Understanding of Science at the University of Notre Dame. This role is among the first of its kind in the United States. As the Professor for the Public Understanding of Science, Dr. Biberdorf is bridging the gap between the scientific community and the general public, ensuring that scientific knowledge is widely disseminated and valued across society.

Before joining Notre Dame, Biberdorf served as Director of Demonstrations and Outreach in the College of Natural Sciences in the University of Texas at Austin. She teaches general chemistry and scientific literacy to classes of five hundred students. After a few months, she created the program Fun with Chemistry, which introduces elementary, middle and high school students to chemistry experiments. The program reaches more than 20,000 students every year.

Outside of her teaching role at the University of Notre Dame, Biberdorf is active in public engagement and science communication. Most of the demonstrations involve explosions or fire. She created a series of chemistry shows called the Puking Pumpkin Tour, which she performed at the USA Science and Engineering Festival. She has presented a science show at the Simmons University Leadership Conference. CNN, NBC Nightly News with Lester Holt and Amy Poehler’s Smart Girls program have all featured Biberdorf for her demonstrations.

Biberdorf also promotes women in STEM. Biberdorf delivered a TEDxDetroit Creating a STEM Army of Women in 2018. That year, she was selected by BuzzFeed as one of the world's top women scientists and was included in Amy Poehler's Smart Girls. She is regularly featured in the media, including on Great Big Story, The Wall Street Journal, Today, The Late Show with Stephen Colbert, The Wendy Williams Show, and CBS.

Biberdorf is writing a series of children's science books with Penguin Random House. The "Kate the Chemist" fiction series explore the activities of Kate, a ten year old who uses her understanding of science and technology to solve problems in her everyday life. Kate the Chemist: The Big Book of Experiments includes science experiments for children to try at home.
