= Trevante Rhodes =

American actor and former sprinter (born 1990)

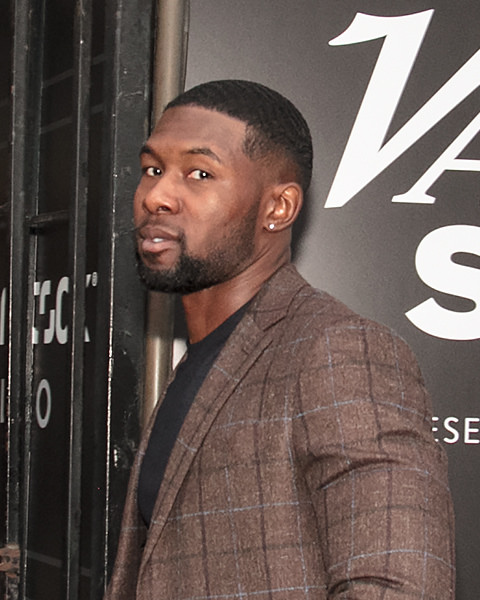
- Rhodes at the 2016 Toronto International Film Festival
- Born: Trevante Nemour Rhodes; February 10, 1990 (age 36); Ponchatoula, Louisiana, U.S.
- Education: University of Texas at Austin
- Occupation: Actor
- Years active: 2012–present
- Sports career
- Sport: Running
- Events: 100 metres, 200 metres
- College team: Texas Longhorns

Sports achievements and titles
- Personal bests: 100 m: 10.33 (Austin 2011); 200 m: 21.09 (Norman 2011)
Medal record
Men's athletics
Representing the United States
Pan American Junior Championships
Gold medal – first place	2009 Port-of-Spain	4×100 m relay

Trevante Nemour Rhodes (born February 10, 1990) is an American actor. He won several accolades and achieved recognition in 2016 for his performance as "Black" (Adult Chiron) in the Academy Award-winning film Moonlight. He has since starred in The Predator (2018), Bird Box (2018), and The United States vs. Billie Holiday (2021). In his youth, he was an accomplished track and field sprinter, winning a gold medal at the Pan American Junior Athletics Championships in 2009.

== Early life and education ==
Rhodes was born in Ponchatoula, Louisiana to Demour Dangelo and Jessi Rhodes. His family moved to Little Elm, Texas when he was ten. He has one brother, Giovanni. At Little Elm High School, Rhodes played running back in an option offense with Cole Beasley at quarterback. He also played left cornerback opposite Beasley at right cornerback.

Over his high school career, Rhodes earned four letters in both football and track and field, where he competed as a sprinter specializing in the 100 and 200 meter dash. As a junior, Rhodes finished second behind Whitney Prevost over both distances at the 2007 University Interscholastic League Track and Field Championships at Mike A. Myers Stadium.

While his senior year was cut short by an ACL injury on the football field, he still earned an athletic scholarship in track and field to the University of Texas at Austin. He studied kinesiology.

Rhodes competed for the Texas Longhorns as a sprinter from 2008 to 2012. At the 2009 Pan American Junior Athletics Championships in Port of Spain, Trinidad and Tobago, Rhodes helped the U.S. squad to a gold medal in the 4×100 metres relay.

== Career ==
=== 2012–2015 ===
After graduation he immediately began working as an actor, playing a supporting role in the Nacho Vigalondo film Open Windows opposite Elijah Wood, the Eddie O’Keefe film Shangri-La Suite and the Matt Jones / Dave Hill film The Night Is Young.

Trevante played the role of Ramsey in the Tyler Perry / OWN series If Loving You Is Wrong. His television credits include the Fox series Gang Related and the HBO series Westworld.

=== 2016: Moonlight ===
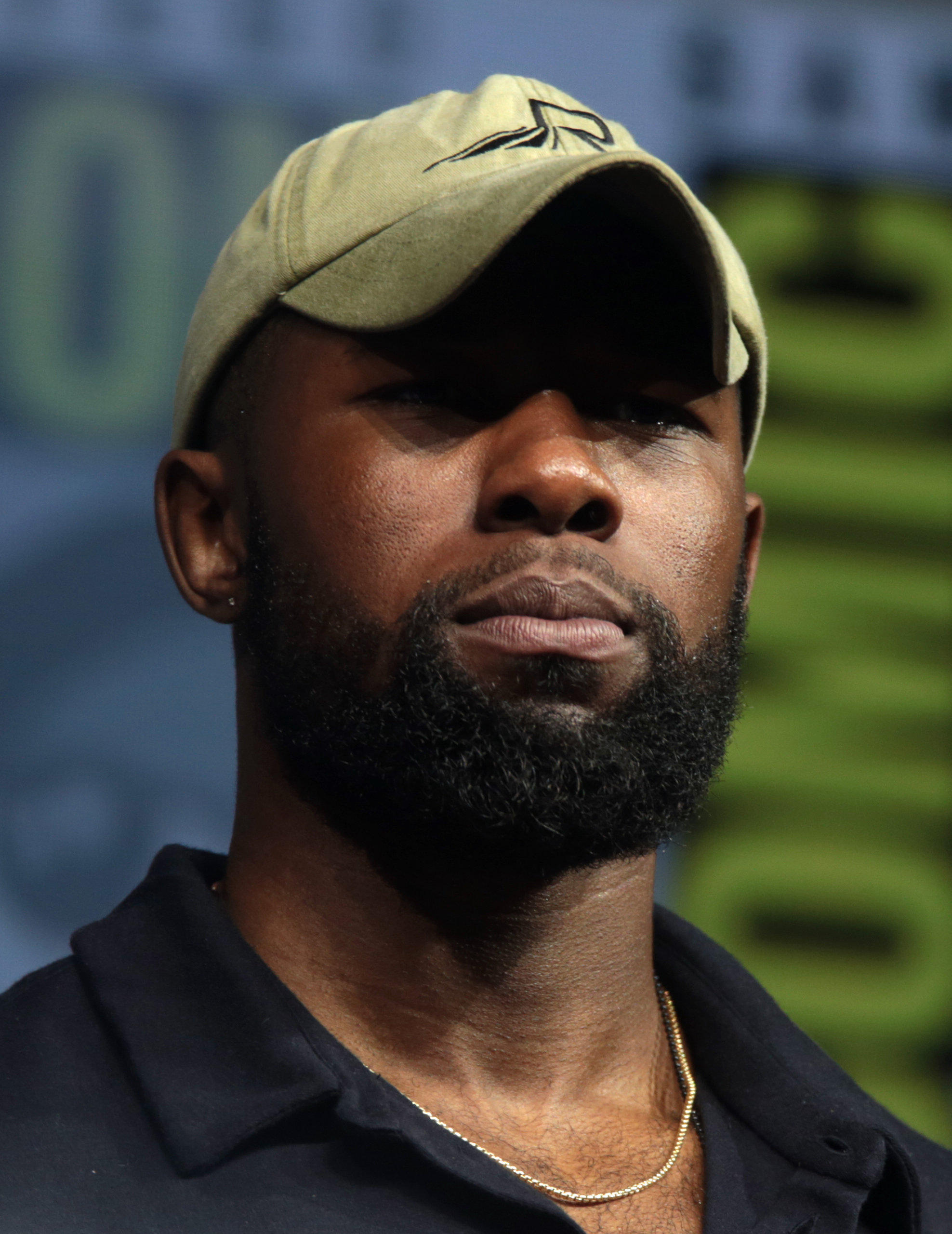
Rhodes at the 2018 San Diego Comic-Con.

Rhodes rose to fame for his much praised performance in the 2016 film Moonlight, as the adult Chiron. While talking about the movie in an interview with Out, Rhodes said: "Being a black person in America right now is shit, being a homosexual in America right now is shit, and being a black homosexual is the bottom for certain people. That’s why I’m so excited for people to see Moonlight. I don’t feel like there’s a solution for our problems, but this movie might change people. That’s why you do it—because you feel like you’re doing something that matters. This is someone’s story." The film won the Golden Globe Award for Best Picture – Drama and the Academy Award for Best Picture and Best Adapted Screenplay.

=== 2017–present ===
In February 2017, Rhodes was featured on Calvin Klein's 2017 Spring underwear campaign along with Moonlight stars Mahershala Ali, Ashton Sanders, and Alex R. Hibbert, and in late 2017, he appeared in the music video for Jay-Z's "Family Feud".

In 2018, Rhodes co-starred in the science-fiction action film The Predator and the post-apocalyptic thriller film Bird Box.

In 2022, he portrayed Mike Tyson in the Hulu miniseries Mike.

In 2024, he starred alongside Kelly Rowland in Mea Culpa, which was written and directed by Tyler Perry and released on Netflix.

In April 2026, Rhodes was cast as Dom in the fourth and final season of the Netflix series The Night Agent.

== Filmography ==
=== Film ===
Year	Title	Role	Notes
2012	I Came Back	Dr. Peter Montgomery	Short film
2014	Open Windows	Brian	
2015	The Night Is Young	George	
2016	Lady Luck	Daryl	
2016	Shangri-La Suite	Mike	
2016	Moonlight	Chiron Harris (a.k.a. Black)	
2017	Burning Sands	Fernander	
2017	Song to Song		Scenes deleted
2017	Smartass	Mike C	
2018	12 Strong	Sergeant First Class Ben Milo	
2018	The Predator	Nebraska Williams	
2018	Bird Box	Tom	
2021	The United States vs. Billie Holiday	Jimmy Fletcher	
2022	Bruiser	Porter	
2023	Candy Cane Lane	Tre	
2024	Mea Culpa	Zyair Malloy	
2027	F.A.S.T. †		Post-production

=== Television ===
Year	Title	Role	Notes
2014	Gang Related	Young Lord #1	Episode: "Pecados del Padre"
2015–16	If Loving You Is Wrong	Ramsey Walters	Recurring role (seasons 1–2); 12 episodes
2016	Westworld	Bachelor	Episode: "The Original"
2022	Mike	Mike Tyson	Main role; also executive producer
TBA	The Night Agent †	Dom	Main role (season 4)

== Awards and nominations ==
Year	Ceremony	Category	Nominated work	Result
2016	Chicago Film Critics Association	Best Supporting Actor	Moonlight	Nominated
2016	Chicago Film Critics Association	Most Promising Performer	Moonlight	Nominated
2016	Detroit Film Critics Society	Best Breakthrough	Moonlight	Nominated
2016	Austin Film Critics Association	Best Supporting Actor	Moonlight	Nominated
2016	Austin Film Critics Association	Breakthrough Artist Award	Moonlight	Nominated
2017	Independent Spirit Awards	Robert Altman Award	Moonlight	Won
2017	Dorian Awards	Film Performance of the Year — Actor	Moonlight	Nominated
2017	Dorian Awards	Rising Star Award	Moonlight	Won
2017	Screen Actors Guild Award	Screen Actors Guild Award for Outstanding Performance by a Cast in a Motion Picture	Moonlight	Nominated
2017	NAACP Image Awards	Outstanding Supporting Actor in a Motion Picture	Moonlight	Nominated
2017	Black Reel Awards	Outstanding Breakthrough Performance, Male	Moonlight	Won
2023	NAACP Image Awards	Outstanding Actor in a Television Movie, Limited Series or Dramatic Special	Mike	Nominated
2023	Independent Spirit Awards	Best Supporting Performance	Bruiser	Nominated
2024	Black Reel Awards	Outstanding Supporting Performance in a TV Movie/Limited Series	Bruiser	Nominated
