= Bird in Hand (film) =

2025 American comedy-drama film

Bird In Hand
- Theatrical release poster
- Directed by: Melody C. Roscher
- Written by: Melody C. Roscher
- Produced by: Craig Shilowich; Alex Schepsman; Danielle Massie; Cody Ryder; Sam Bisbee; Saba Zerehi
- Starring: Alisha Wainwright; Christine Lahti; James Le Gros; Annabelle Dexter-Jones; Jeffrey Nordling; K. Todd Freeman
- Cinematography: Matt Clegg
- Edited by: David Formentin
- Music by: Calvin Hagenson; Morgan Henderson
- Production companies: Park Pictures; Mizzle Media; Ossentra Films; Spark Features; Zeus Pictures; The Wonder Club
- Distributed by: The Future of Film Is Female; Persimmon
- Release dates: June 6, 2025 (Tribeca); October 2, 2026 (United States)
- Running time: 87 minutes
- Country: United States
- Language: English

Bird In Hand is a 2025 American comedy-drama film written and directed by Melody C. Roscher, in her directorial debut. It stars Alisha Wainwright, Christine Lahti, James Le Gros, Annabelle Dexter-Jones, Jeffrey Nordling and K. Todd Freeman.

It had its world premiere at the 2025 Tribeca Festival on June 6, 2025, and is scheduled to be released on October 2, 2026, by The Future of Film Is Female and Persimmon.

== Premise ==
Returning home to visit her mother, Bird searches for the perfect wedding venue, but to everyone's surprise, she's searching for something else.

== Cast ==
- Alisha Wainwright as Bird Rowe
- Christine Lahti as Carlotta
- James Le Gros as Dennis
- Annabelle Dexter-Jones as Leigh
- Jeffrey Nordling as Dale
- K. Todd Freeman as Bower

== Production ==
Principal photography began in July 2024, in and around Richmond, Virginia.

== Release ==
It had its world premiere at the 2025 Tribeca Festival on June 6, 2025. In September 2026, The Future of Film Is Female and Persimmon acquired distribution rights to the film, setting it for an October 2, 2026, theatrical release, prior to video on demand in December.
