= Chiron Harris =

Fictional protagonist of Moonlight

- Moonlight character
- Created by: Tarell Alvin McCraney; Barry Jenkins
- Portrayed by: Trevante Rhodes (adult); Ashton Sanders (teen); Alex Hibbert (young)

In-universe information
- Aliases: "Black" (adult); "Little" (young)

Chiron Harris (/ʃaɪˈroʊn/ shy-ROHN) is a fictional character and the protagonist of the 2016 coming-of-age drama film Moonlight. Created by Tarell Alvin McCraney and Barry Jenkins, Chiron is portrayed by Trevante Rhodes as an adult, Ashton Sanders as a teenager, and Alex Hibbert as a child. Chiron goes through the stages of humankind; a child, teenager, and adult, with his close friend, Kevin, who both seek each other as a romantic interest.

The three actors who collectively portrayed the character Chiron were part of the ensemble that won the Critics' Choice Award for Best Acting Ensemble. The actor who played Chiron as an adult, Trevante Rhodes, won several accolades for his performance. He was also nominated for an NAACP Image Award for Outstanding Supporting Actor in a Motion Picture.
