= The Graduates (2023 film) =

2023 American drama film by Hannah Peterson

- Film poster
- Directed by: Hannah Peterson
- Written by: Hannah Peterson
- Produced by: Taylor Shung; Josh Peters; Saba Zerehi; Jessamine Burgum
- Starring: Mina Sundwall; Alex R. Hibbert; Yasmeen Fletcher; Ewan Manley; John Cho; Maria Dizzia; Kelly O'Sullivan
- Cinematography: Carolina Costa
- Edited by: Hannah Peterson
- Music by: Andrew Orkin
- Production companies: Book of Shadows; Pinky Promise
- Distributed by: The Future of Film Is Female
- Release dates: June 10, 2023 (Tribeca); November 1, 2024 (United States)
- Running time: 87 minutes
- Country: United States
- Language: English

The Graduates is a 2023 American drama film written, directed, and edited by Hannah Peterson, in her directorial debut. It stars Mina Sundwall, Alex R. Hibbert, Yasmeen Fletcher, Ewan Manley, John Cho, Maria Dizzia, and Kelly O'Sullivan.

It had its world premiere at the Tribeca Festival on June 10, 2023, and was released on November 1, 2024, by The Future of Film Is Female.

== Plot ==
A young woman prepares to graduate high school following the death of her boyfriend to gun violence, a year prior.

== Cast ==
- Mina Sundwall as Genevieve
- Alex R. Hibbert as Ben
- Yasmeen Fletcher as Romie
- Ewan Manley as Becker
- John Cho as John
- Maria Dizzia as Maggie
- Kelly O'Sullivan as Vicki
- Augustina Tang as Jazell

== Production ==
Hannah Peterson was interested in telling a coming-of-age story set in the public school system, when Peterson began speaking to current and former high school students, the same anxiety of safety in schools kept popping up. Peterson chose to keep gun violence off-screen in order to situate the plot on grief. The script was initially written in chapters, but during post-production, the film was re-ordered.

== Release ==
The film had its world premiere at the Tribeca Festival on June 10, 2023. It went on to screen at the Deauville American Film Festival on September 5, 2023. In September 2024, The Future of Film Is Female acquired distribution rights to the film, which was released on November 1, 2024. Tribeca Films acquired digital distribution rights to the film, with a video on demand release on February 4, 2025.

== Reception ==
On the review aggregator website Rotten Tomatoes, 96% of 26 critics' reviews are positive, with an average rating of 7.8/10. Metacritic, which uses a weighted average, assigned the film a score of 77 out of 100, based on 7 critics, indicating "generally favorable" reviews.
