= Alexandra Pechman =

American filmmaker

- Occupations: Director, producer, writer
- Years active: 2018–present
- Spouse: Nick Antosca

Alexandra Pechman is an American filmmaker and journalist. She made her directorial debut with Magazine (2026). Her writing has appeared in Vogue, The New York Times, Artforum and Vanity Fair.

== Early life ==
Pechman graduated from Medill School of Journalism. She is married to screenwriter Nick Antosca.

== Career ==
Prior to filmmaking, Pechman wrote for multiple magazines Vogue, The New York Times, Artforum and Vanity Fair and served as a staffer at W,, The Paris Review and Aperture.

Pechman wrote an episode of Channel Zero for Syfy. and Into the Dark for Hulu and Blumhouse.

Pechman directed the short films Thumb which had its world premiere at the Fantasia International Film Festival, and Sleep which screened at the Museum of Modern Art and received a grant from The Future of Film Is Female.

In 2026, she made her directorial debut with Magazine which had its world premiere at the 2026 Toronto International Film Festival.
