= Cassandra Freeman =

American actress

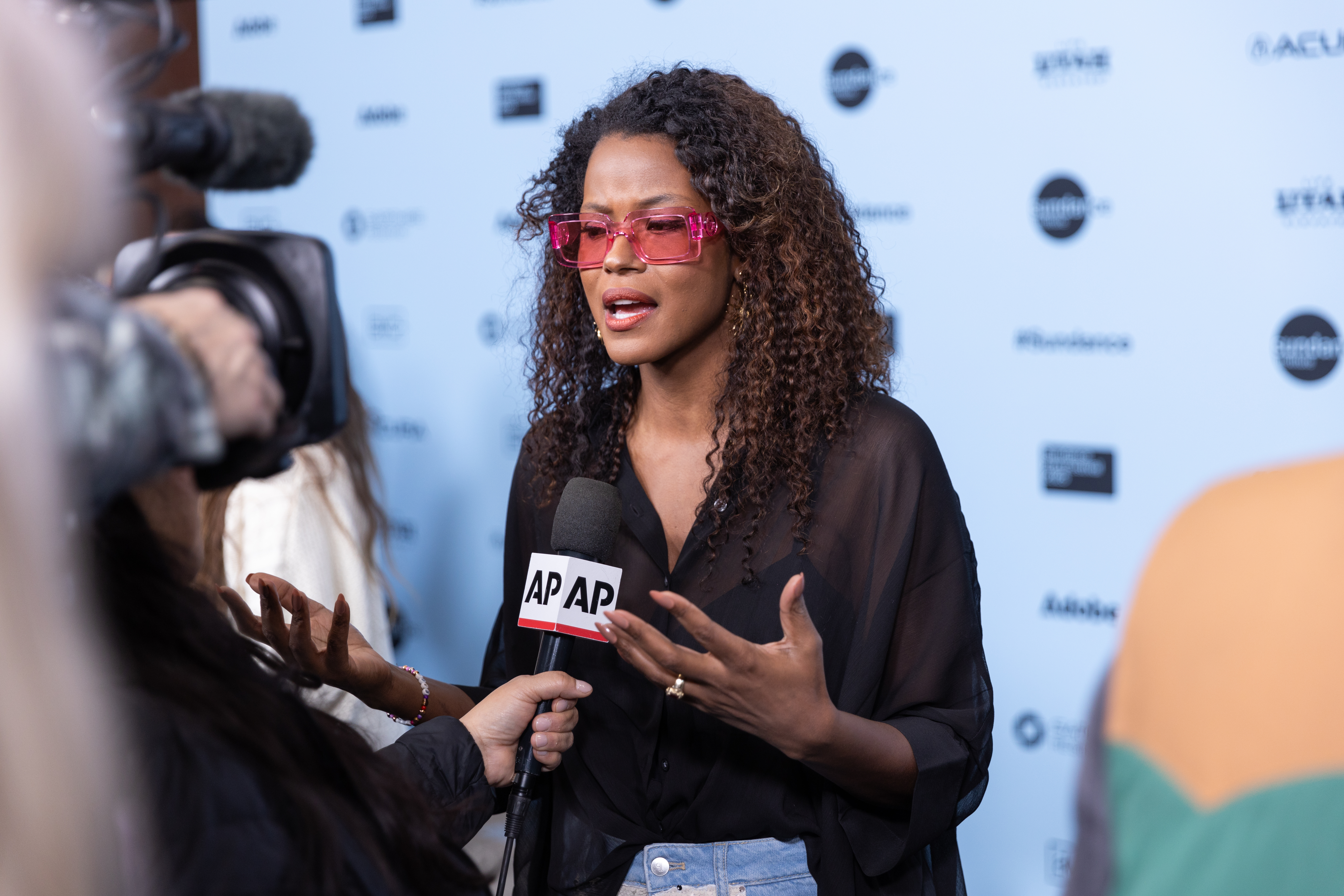
- Freeman in 2025
- Born: October 1, 1978 (age 47); West Palm Beach, Florida
- Occupation: Actress
- Years active: 2001–present

Cassandra Freeman is an American actress. She is best known for playing Vivian Banks in the drama series Bel-Air and Jacqueline Pettigrew in the drama series The Enemy Within (TV series).

== Early life ==
Freeman was born in West Palm Beach, Florida. She grew up in Jacksonville, Florida where she attended an art high school. She graduated from the New York University Tisch School of the Arts. Her father passed away shortly after her graduation.

== Career ==
One of Freemans earliest roles was playing Officer Sylvia in the crime thriller movie Inside Man starring Denzel Washington. Her first big role came playing Jacqueline Pettigrew, one of the lead characters in the drama series The Enemy Within (TV series) starring Morris Chestnut. She played Wanda Durant, the mother of NBA legend Kevin Durant in the biographical film about her life The Real MVP: The Wanda Durant Story. She gained worldwide popularity for playing Vivian Banks, the aunt of a young Will Smith in the drama series Bel-Air.

== Personal life ==
Freeman is married to sound director Tom Paul and together they have a son named Hudson born in 2018

== Filmography ==
=== Film ===
Year	Title	Role	Notes
2001	The Things We Do for Love	Nisa	Short
2006	Inside Man	Sylvia	
2007	I Think I Love My Wife	Jennifer	
2011	Kinyarwanda	Lt. Rose	
2011	First World Problem	Rose	
2012	To Redemption	Simone	
2012	Little Women, Big Cars	Julie	
2012	Little Women, Big Cars 2	Julie	
2012	The Last 48	Rose	
2012	What About Us?	Justice Johnson	Short
2013	Blue Caprice	Angela	
2013	Rendezvous	Woman	
2013	80/20	Cassandra	
2014	Wish Wizard	Mrs. Shaffer	
2014	How We Got Away with It	Anne	
2015	Somewhere in the Middle	Billie	
2015	Supermodel	Grace	
2016	Long Nights Short Mornings	Anna	
2016	The Real MVP: The Wanda Durant Story	Wanda Durant	
2017	My Other Home	Stephanie Marbury	
2018	Monsters and Men	Lisa	
2021	Thump	Teacher	Short
2023	Story Ave	Olivia Grayson	
2023	Our Son	Adele	
2025	Love, Brooklyn	Lorna	
2026	Lovin Venus		Pre Production

=== Television ===
Year	Title	Role	Notes
2007	Shark	Grace Hernandez	Episode; Burning Sensation
2006-2008	Numbers	Tech, Alexis Lee	3 episodes
2012	The Good Wife	Kristen Norris	Episode; After the Fall
2012-2014	Single Ladies	Morgan	7 episodes
2016	Conviction	Zadie Daniels	Episode; Bridge and Tunnel Vision
2016	Atlanta	Monique Allen	Episode; Juneteenth
2017	Blue Bloods	Shelly Wayne	2 episodes
2016-2018	Luke Cage	Patricia Wilson	4 episodes
2019	The Enemy Within	Jacqueline Pettigrew	13 episodes
2019	Bluff City Law	ADA Cain	Episode; 25 Years to Life
2021	For Life	Veronica Marshall	3 episodes
2020-2021	The Last O.G.	Jasmine	4 episodes
2023	Young Love	Additional Love	2 episodes
2025	The Better Sister	Jaine	Episode; Gazpacho
2022-2025	Bel-Air	Vivian Banks	38 episodes
