= Apatow =

Apatow is a surname. Notable people with the surname include:

- Iris Apatow (born 2002), American actress and socialite
- Judd Apatow (born 1967), American director, producer, and screenwriter
  - Apatow Productions, American film and television production company founded by Judd
- Maude Apatow (born 1997), American actress
