= Mina Sundwall =

American actress (born 2001)

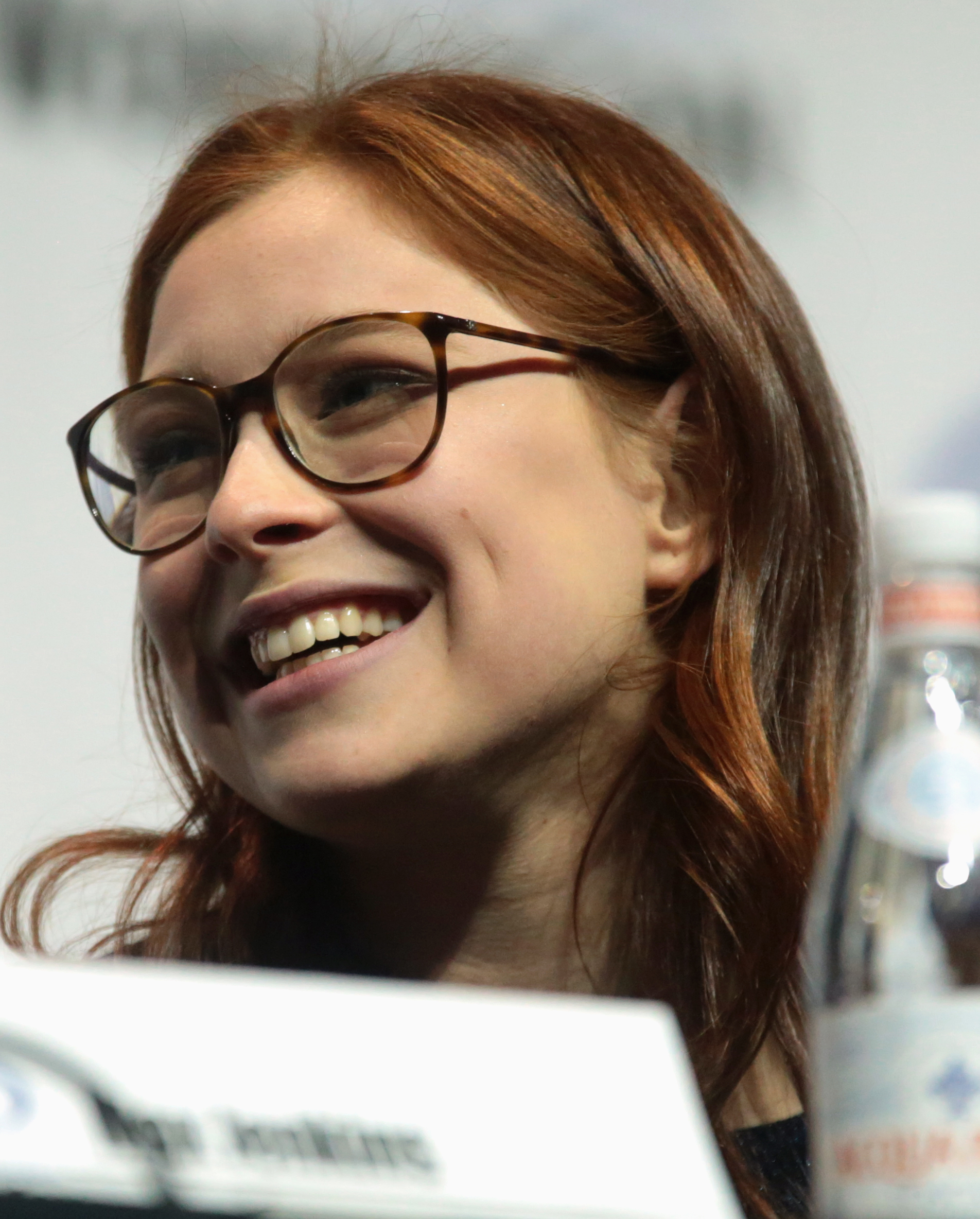
- Sundwall in 2018
- Born: October 23, 2001 (age 24); New York City, U.S.
- Occupation: Actress
- Years active: 2010–present

Mina Sundwall (born October 23, 2001) is an American actress. She is best known for portraying Penny Robinson in the 2018 Netflix television series Lost in Space. She also provided the voice and motion capture for Thrúd in the Santa Monica Studio video game God of War: Ragnarök.

== Biography ==
In 2012, she made her first appearance on television in a season 4 episode of Celebrity Ghost Stories. She appeared in Law & Order: Special Victims Unit in 2014. In 2015, she acted in the romantic comedy-drama Maggie's Plan, the drama Freeheld, and the horror film #Horror. She played the role of Penny Robinson in the Netflix series Lost in Space, which first aired in April 2018.

In May 2022, Sundwall joined the cast of thriller podcast series Jane Anonymous, based on the novel of the same name by Laurie Faria Stolarz.

== Filmography ==
=== TV and Film ===
Year	Title	Role	Notes
2012	Celebrity Ghost Stories	Kathy	Season 4, Episode 21
2014	A Good Marriage	Young Petra	
2014	Law & Order: Special Victims Unit	Mia Harris	Episode: "Glasgowman's Wrath"
2015	Maggie's Plan	Justine	
2015	Freeheld	Maya Kelder	
2015	#Horror	Francesca	
2018–2021	Lost in Space	Penny Robinson	Main role; 28 episodes
2020–2021	Legends of Tomorrow	Lita	Recurring role; 8 episodes
2023	Jesus Revolution	Dodie	
2023	The Graduates	Genevieve	
2025	Murdaugh: Death in the Family	Brooklynn White	Miniseries

=== Video games ===
Year	Title	Role
2022	God of War Ragnarök	Thrúd
