= Magazine (film) =

2026 American drama film

- Directed by: Alexandra Pechman
- Written by: Alexandra Pechman
- Produced by: Anne Alexander; Tess Cohen; Alexandra Pechman
- Starring: Lily McInerny; Joshuah Melnick; Lukita Maxwell; AnnaSophia Robb; Daniel Zolghadri; Ruby Cruz; Jake Lacy; Iris Apatow; Delaney Rowe; Alex Edelman; Sasha Bhasin
- Cinematography: Alex Ashe
- Edited by: Blair McClendon
- Music by: Zach Robinson
- Production companies: Cousins; Project Infinity
- Release date: September 11, 2026 (TIFF)
- Running time: 105 minutes
- Country: United States
- Language: English

Magazine is a 2026 American drama film written and directed by Alexandra Pechman in her directorial debut. It stars Lily McInerny, Joshuah Melnick, Lukita Maxwell, AnnaSophia Robb, Daniel Zolghadri, Ruby Cruz, Jake Lacy, Iris Apatow, Delaney Rowe, Alex Edelman and Sasha Bhasin.

It had its world premiere in the Discovery section of the 2026 Toronto International Film Festival on September 11, 2026.

== Premise ==
A young poet begins an internship at an acclaimed literary journal.

== Cast ==
- Lily McInerny as Nora
- Joshuah Melnick as Thomas
- Lukita Maxwell as Tabitha
- AnnaSophia Robb
- Daniel Zolghadri as Leonard
- Ruby Cruz as Greer
- Jake Lacy as Mickey
- Iris Apatow as Daphne
- Delaney Rowe
- Alex Edelman
- Sasha Bhasin as Tess
- Stephanie Reedy as Rachel

== Release ==
It had its world premiere in the Discovery section of the 2026 Toronto International Film Festival on September 11, 2026.
