= Story Ave =

- Theatrical release poster
- Directed by: Aristotle Torres
- Written by: Aristotle Torres; Bonsu Thompson
- Produced by: Aristotle Torres; Lizzie Shapiro; Datari Turner; Jamie Foxx
- Starring: Asante Blackk; Luis Guzmán; Melvin Gregg; Alex R. Hibbert; Coral Pena; Cassandra Freeman; Hassan Johnson
- Cinematography: Eric Branco
- Edited by: Jasmin Way
- Music by: Pierre Charles; Chuck Inglish
- Production companies: First Gen Content; Foxxhole Entertainment; The Space Program; Mero Mero Productions; Dark Rabbit Productions
- Distributed by: Kino Lorber
- Release dates: March 11, 2023 (SXSW); September 29, 2023 (United States)
- Running time: 94 minutes
- Country: United States
- Language: English
- Box office: $60,218

Story Ave is a 2023 American drama film directed by Aristotle Torres from a script by Torres and Bonsu Thompson, produced by Torres and Jamie Foxx, and starring Asante Blackk, Luis Guzmán, Melvin Gregg and Alex R. Hibbert. It is based on Torres's 2018 short film of the same name, which in turn was based on a true story.

Story Ave had its world premiere at South by Southwest on March 11, 2023. It was released by Kino Lorber in select cinemas on September 29, 2023. At the 55th NAACP Image Awards the film was nominated for Outstanding Independent Motion Picture.

== Premise ==
A teenage graffiti artist runs away from home and robs an MTA worker at gunpoint, which changes the lives of them both forever.

== Cast ==
- Asante Blackk as Kadir Grayson
- Luis Guzmán as Luis Torres
- Melvin Gregg as Sean Skemes Hernandez
- Alex R. Hibbert as Maurice Moe Hernandez
- Coral Pena as Gloria Sanchez
- Cassandra Freeman as Olivia Grayson
- Hassan Johnson as Reggie

== Production ==
In August 2022, it was announced Asante Blackk, Melvin Gregg, Alex R. Hibbert, Coral Pena, Cassandra Freeman, Hassan Johnson and Luis Guzmán had joined the cast of the film, with Aristotle Torres directing from a screenplay he wrote alongside Bonsu Thompson, and Jamie Foxx serving as a producer.

== Release ==
The film had its world premiere at the 2023 South by Southwest Film & TV Festival on March 11, 2023. In May 2023, Kino Lorber acquired distribution rights to the film.

The film was released in the United States on September 29, 2023.

== Reception ==
On the review aggregator website Rotten Tomatoes, 95% of 21 critics' reviews are positive, with an average rating of 7.60/10. Metacritic, which uses a weighted average, assigned the film a score of 66 out of 100, based on 9 critics, indicating "generally favorable" reviews.
