= Sunfish (& Other Stories on Green Lake) =

2025 drama film

- Theatrical release poster
- Directed by: Sierra Falconer
- Written by: Sierra Falconer
- Produced by: Sierra Falconer; Grant Ellison
- Starring: Maren Heary; Jim Kaplan; Karsen Liotta; Dominic Bogart; Tenley Kellogg; Emily Hall
- Cinematography: Marcus Patterson
- Edited by: Chelsi Johnston
- Music by: Brian Steckler
- Distributed by: The Future of Film Is Female
- Release dates: January 26, 2025 (Sundance); September 12, 2025 (United States)
- Running time: 87 minutes
- Country: United States
- Language: English

Sunfish (& Other Stories on Green Lake) is a 2025 American semi-autobiographical anthology drama film directed, written, and produced by Sierra Falconer in her feature directorial debut. An anthology film that also serves as Falconer's senior thesis film for the completion of her studies at the University of California, Los Angeles, it follows the lives of four people living around Green Lake. Falconer called it "loosely autobiographical."

The film premiered at the Sundance Film Festival in the U.S. Dramatic Competition on January 26, 2025.

== Synopsis ==
Set around Green Lake in northern Michigan, the film has four episodes:

1. "Sunfish"
2. "Summer Camp"
3. "Two Hearted"
4. "Resident Bird"

== Production ==
Falconer and producer Grant Ellison, who are married, started discussing the film in 2022. Falconer, a film student at University of California, Los Angeles (UCLA), grew up in Traverse City, Michigan and wanted to capture the experience of coming of age there, specifically at Green Lake, through film. She felt that an anthology film structure "was the only way to tell this story well."

Toward the end of 2022, Falconer and Ellison began working on financing; Falconer sought thesis funding from UCLA. The next year, they began casting and putting together a crew. By that summer, they started production. The film received an SAG-AFTRA exemption to continue filming through 2023.

A private screening was shown in the middle of 2024. The film served as Falconer's thesis film, for UCLA's MFA in the Department of Film, Television & Digital Media, and was picked up for a premiere at the Sundance Film Festival in 2025. In January 2025, Joanna Hogg joined the film as an executive producer. Falconer was also signed for representation to WME. In July 2025, The Future of Film Is Female acquired distribution rights to the film, and released it on September 12, 2025.

== Reception ==
On the review aggregator website Rotten Tomatoes, 80% of 30 critics' reviews are positive. The website's consensus reads: "Sierra Falconer's serene coming of age anthology feature debut packs in more sublime hits than overwrought misses." Metacritic, which uses a weighted average, assigned the film a score of 79 out of 100, based on 8 critics, indicating "generally favorable" reviews.

Vulture, cautioning against the exhaustion of anthology films, lauded Falconer's approach, stating: "Steeped in the pleasantly lazy atmosphere of the title setting, the film is languorous, but not long. And you might find yourself thinking about it for days... These incomplete individual stories all dance on the edge of transformation, even though we can’t quite tell what comes next for these people." SLUG wrote that "Falconer delivers an evocative portrait of a cherished place, capturing its timeless quality through the lives of its characters." Moveable Fest found both Falconer's capturing of Green Lake's atmosphere to be "enchanting" unto itself but also lauded the storylines of each of her characters.
