= Delaney Rowe =

American social media personality, actress, and comedian

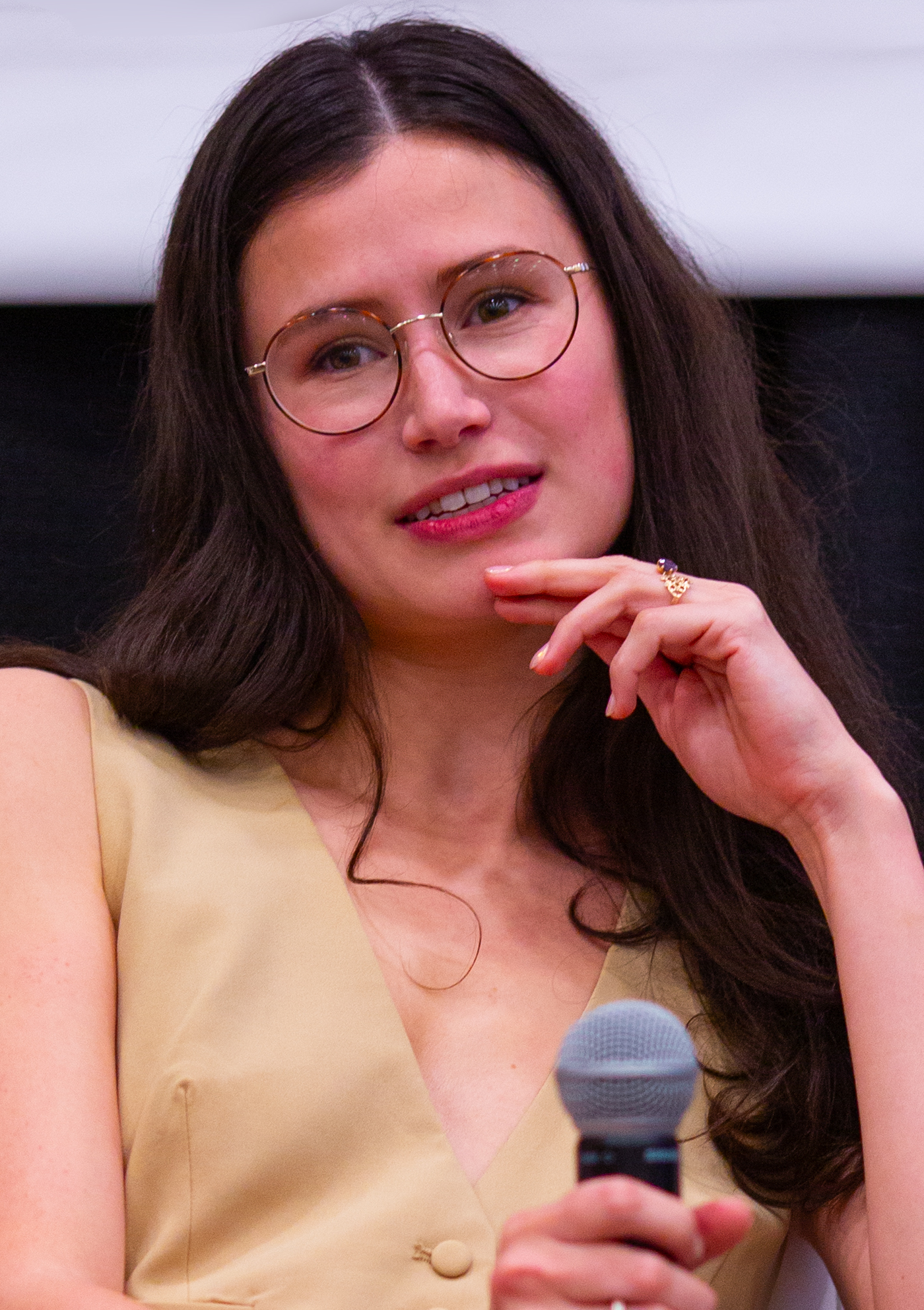
- Rowe at SXSW 2024
- Born: Delaney Marie Rowe; September 1994 or 1995 (age 30–31)
- Education: University of Southern California (BFA)
- Occupations: Social media personality; actress; comedian
- Years active: 2020–present

TikTok information
- Page: Delaney Rowe
- Followers: 3.2 million
- Last updated: July 15, 2025

Delaney Marie Rowe is an American social media personality, actress, and comedian. She is known for her cringe comedy videos on TikTok in which she parodies character tropes in media, such as the "absolutely insufferable female lead of an indie movie."

== Life and career ==
Rowe was raised in Boise, Idaho. Inspired by the 2004 film Confessions of a Teenage Drama Queen to pursue acting, she regularly performed in the Idaho Shakespeare Festival growing up. She moved from Idaho to Los Angeles to attend the University of Southern California School of Dramatic Arts, where she earned a BFA in acting in 2017. She worked as a hostess at a restaurant while auditioning for roles. She then started working as a personal chef after making flyers, on which she lied about attending culinary school, and putting them in mailboxes around Beverly Hills. Rowe appeared in the 2020 short film The Wine as Cara.

Starting in 2020, Rowe started posting comedy sketches—which she writes, performs in, and edits—on TikTok. Her first video on the platform to go viral was a comedy sketch in which she gave a monologue about rain from the perspective of the "absolutely insufferable female lead of an indie movie". She continued to play this character in later videos that also went viral on the platform. Her videos typically feature cringe comedy and parodies of other media tropes, such as female characters written by men and Manic Pixie Dream Girls. She appeared in the 2023 film The List. As of 2023, she is signed to United Talent Agency.

== Personal life ==
As of 2023, Rowe lives in Echo Park, Los Angeles. She was in a relationship with B. J. Novak.

== Filmography ==
=== Film ===
Year	Title	Role	Notes
2019	The Drone	Model	Feature film debut
2023	The List	Leyna Stone	
2024	The Everything Pot	Clare	
2026	Magazine		
2027	You Deserve Each Other	Wren	

=== Television ===
Year	Title	Role	Notes
2017	WannabeZ	The Waitress	Episode: "Pilot"
2019	Critters: A New Binge	Screaming Woman	Episode: "No Eating"
2025	Brooklyn Coffee Shop	Manic Pixie Dream Girl	Episode: "Episode 60"
