= Melvin Gregg =

American actor

- Born: Portsmouth, Virginia, United States
- Occupation: Actor
- Spouse: Bobbie Nelson
- Children: 1 son

Melvin Gregg is an American actor known for his roles as DeMarcus Tillman in Netflix's mockumentary series American Vandal, Erick Scott in Steven Soderbergh's sports drama film High Flying Bird, Drew 'Manboy' Miller on FX's crime drama Snowfall, and Ben Chandler in the Hulu series Nine Perfect Strangers.

== Early life and career ==
Gregg was born in Portsmouth, Virginia to parents Constance Gregg and Melvin Vaughan. He has six sisters. After graduating from I.C. Norcom High School, he studied marketing at Old Dominion University for 2 years before changing his career path and moved to Los Angeles in 2011 to pursue acting.

Gregg came to prominence by creating and sharing comedic content in which he starred, wrote, and produced on Vine. He amassed more than 7 million followers in the course of 3 years, becoming one of the top 100 personalities on the platform.

His first credited role was in the web series Whatever, The Series. In 2011 where he earned union eligibility. Following Vine's decline in 2015, Gregg transitioned into film and TV roles. In 2018, he earned roles in the Netflix mockumentary series American Vandal and in the film High Flying Bird. Gregg's performance as DeMarcus Tillman garnered him praise from outlets such as Film School Rejects and a comparison from Live Mint to actor Will Smith in The Fresh Prince of Bel-Air. Entertainment Weekly and Vulture have described the role as a breakout one for Gregg.

Gregg joined the cast in the third (2019) season of the FX television series Snowfall in the main role of Drew 'Manboy' Miller, and portrayed the character of Marcus Parrish in the sports drama The Way Back in 2020. He also filmed a video examining BET's support of Black culture during the early 2000s alongside Sam Jay. During 2020 Gregg also announced that he would be creating a movie for the newly launched interactive fiction app Whatifi, entitled This Call Will Be Recorded. Viewers would be able to select choices that would enable them to view one of sixteen different endings. In 2021, he played Joe Guy in The United States vs. Billie Holiday, and had a series regular role in the Hulu series Nine Perfect Strangers.

== Personal life ==
Gregg and his wife Bobbie Leigh Nelson have one son, Marley Amel Gregg, born on May 15, 2020.

== Filmography ==
=== Film ===
Year	Title	Role	Notes
2012	The Fallen Prodigy	Thug 1	
2012	Pushing Eternity	Nate	Short
2013	Coldwater	Inmate	
2013	Cleaver Family Reunion	William Cleaver	
2013	Can	Crazy Lou	
2013	Loss of Life	Derrick	
2013	Benny Picasso	Benny	Short
2014	The System	Hoodie Teen	
2014	Alpha House	Kyle	Video
2014	The Land of Misfits	Patty Cake	Short
2014	Asteroid vs Earth	Sonar Lead Petty Officer	TV movie
2014	SuperZero	Leon Deleon	Short
2015	Sharknado 3: Oh Hell No!	Chad	TV movie
2015	West of the 405	Ty	TV movie
2015	A House Is Not a Home	Alex Williams	
2015	Eddie and the Aviator	Teen #3	Short
2015	Class	Jolley	TV movie
2016	The Land	Brent	
2016	Famous	Trae	Short
2016	Hogwarts High School	Ron	Short
2017	Immortals	Peck	Short
2017	The Fix	Young Thug #2	
2019	High Flying Bird	Erick Scott	
2019	Same Difference	Sebastian	
2020	The Way Back	Marcus Parrish	
2021	The United States vs. Billie Holiday	Joe Guy	
2021	Boxing Day	Ian Gorgeous	
2022	The Blackening	King	
2023	House Party	Larry	
2023	Story Ave	Skemes	
2023	Share?	00000014	

=== Television ===
Year	Title	Role	Notes
2011–2012	Whatever, the Series	Derek	Recurring cast
2012	The Beauty Inside	Alex #30	TV mini series
2013	Jimmy Kimmel Live!	Basketball Player	Episode: "Game Night 1"
2014–2018	King Bachelor's Pad	Astronaut	Recurring cast
2015	Sexless	Jamal	Recurring cast: season 1
2015	Class	Jolley	Main cast
2015	1 Minute Horror	Reshawn	Episode: "The VISITors"
2015–2016	Sadie and Emmie	Coach/Alex	Episode: "Slapshot/Haunting in a Store" & "Strangers"
2016–2017	Freakish	LaShawn Devereux	Main cast
2017	Caught the Series	Latin Gang Member	Recurring cast
2018	Love Daily	Colby Biskin	Episode: "Still Life"
2018	UnREAL	Zach Taylor	Recurring cast: season 3
2018	American Vandal	DeMarcus Tillman	Recurring cast: season 2
2019–2021	Snowfall	Drew 'Manboy' Miller	Recurring cast: seasons 3–4
2020	#BlackAF	Cousin Harold	Episode: "yo, between you and me... this is because of slavery"
2020	Dave	Raheem	Episode: "Jail"
2021	Nine Perfect Strangers	Ben Chandler	Main cast
2022	Zaya	Detective Tucker	Episode: "Trust No One"
2024	Fight Night: The Million Dollar Heist	Andre	Miniseries
2025–present	The Paper	Detrick Moore	Main cast

== Awards ==
Year	Award Show	Category	Result	Ref.
2018	Streamy Awards	Performance, Acting in a Comedy: God's Son	Nominated	
