= Share? =

2023 film by Ira Rosensweig

- Directed by: Ira Rosensweig
- Screenplay by: Benjamin Sutor
- Story by: Ira Rosensweig & Benjamin Sutor
- Produced by: Carissa Buffel; Kevin Matusow; Ira Rosensweig
- Starring: Melvin Gregg; Bradley Whitford; Danielle Campbell; Alice Braga
- Cinematography: Damian Acevedo
- Edited by: Ira Rosensweig
- Music by: Joe Stockton
- Production companies: Traveling Picture Show Company; Wavemaker Creative
- Distributed by: XYZ Films
- Release dates: August 19, 2023 (Cinequest Film & Creativity Festival).; November 3, 2023 (United States)
- Running time: 79 minutes
- Country: United States
- Language: English

Share? is a 2023 American screenlife science fiction thriller feature film directed by Ira Rosensweig, from a screenplay by Benjamin Sutor and story by Rosensweig and Sutor, produced by Carissa Buffel, Kevin Matusow and Rosensweig. It stars Melvin Gregg, Bradley Whitford, Danielle Campbell, and Alice Braga.

A man fights for survival after waking up trapped in a dystopian society connected only through rudimentary computers, where he must entertain to stay alive.

The movie is the first feature ever filmed entirely from one fixed camera angle, and received positive reviews from critics.

The film premiered on August 19, 2023 in San Jose, California at the Cinequest Film & Creativity Festival, where it won the Jury Prize for Best Feature: Thriller, Fantasy, Horror, or Sci-Fi. The film was released by XYZ Films in select theaters on November 3, 2023, and VOD on November 10, 2023.

== Plot ==
The film’s unnamed protagonist, identified as #000000014, wakes up in his underwear in a spare, prison-like room, not knowing how he arrived. After pleading to be released, he realizes that he is being watched through a primitive computer in his wall, and gets rewarded with credits when he performs certain actions, usually ones that make him look like a fool. These credits allow him to buy objects or services to survive in the room.

The protagonist initially thinks he is alone in this predicament, until a surly older man, identified as #006395873, who has been trapped in a different room for a long time, is introduced in a picture-in-picture window on his monitor. He also realizes that there are many other people trapped in other rooms in the system, but #000000014 and #006395873 can only view those rooms, and not communicate with the inhabitants. The two men initially cannot stand each other, but they develop a mutually beneficial relationship where the older man teaches the protagonist to create a comedic persona so he can develop more of a following and therefore gain many more credits, and in return, the protagonist donates some of those credits to the older man.

Just as #000000014 achieves a level of fame and starts to feel more comfortable in his new existence, he gains communication with a woman, identified as #052605011, who is obsessed with figuring out a way to escape. After the older man meets a tragic end, the protagonist and #052605011 resolve to start a revolution within the system in hopes of freeing everyone inside it.

Just as they introduce their plan to the masses, #000000014 realizes that he can now also communicate with another woman, identified as #038491828, who tries to convince him that it is most important to accept their fate and find a way to be happy within the system. #052605011 is convinced that #038491828 is an agent of the system and has been introduced to sabotage them, but #000000014 struggles to believe her. As #000000014 tries to coalesce the movement, each woman encourages their respective followers to silence the other woman, leading to both of their deaths. The protagonist’s computer and room shut down, and when they come back online, his door opens, presenting him with the option to leave, but he starts recording and showing off, and the door then closes.

== Cast ==
- Melvin Gregg as #000000014
- Bradley Whitford as #006395873
- Danielle Campbell as #038491828
- Alice Braga as #052605011

== Release ==
The film premiered on August 19, 2023 in San Jose, California at the Cinequest Film & Creativity Festival, where it won the Jury Prize for Best Feature: Thriller, Fantasy, Horror, or Sci-Fi. The film was released in select theaters on November 3, 2023, and VOD on November 10, 2023.

== Reception ==
=== Critical response ===
SHARE? received mostly positive reviews. Reel News Daily called it, "Disturbing, funny, and undeniably thrilling. One of the smartest genre films of the year.” Film Threat specifically praised Bradley Whitford's performance, stating "Even considering the actor’s storied career, this could be his best work yet.” And Hugo Award-winning writer Christopher J. Garcia said, “This is an absolute masterpiece of a thought-experiment" Robert Kojder at Flickering Myth was more critical, saying “SHARE? is a compelling exercise in acting more than anything.”

A.A. Dowd named SHARE? one of the 10 most underrated movies of 2023.

Many outlets praised the film's interest in provoking the audience to examine their relationship with technology, as well as the innovative approach to production and post-production. Deadline mentioned that, "Given that each character in the story is physically isolated, the shoot (which is currently underway) called for the construction of multiple identical sets with integrated camera systems, teleprompters, and live event technology. The system designed for the project allows the actors to fully interact both with each other and the computer interface central to the story in real time, while giving the director and crew a precise pre-visualization of the finished product."

On the review aggregator website Rotten Tomatoes, 70% of 10 critics' reviews are positive, with an average rating of 6/10.

=== Awards ===
The film won the Jury Prize for Best Feature: Thriller, Fantasy, Horror, or Sci-Fi at the 2023 Cinequest Film & Creativity Festival.
