= Moonlight (2016 film) =

American drama film by Barry Jenkins

- Theatrical release poster
- Directed by: Barry Jenkins
- Screenplay by: Barry Jenkins
- Story by: Tarell Alvin McCraney
- Produced by: Adele Romanski; Dede Gardner; Jeremy Kleiner
- Starring: Trevante Rhodes; André Holland; Janelle Monáe; Ashton Sanders; Jharrel Jerome; Naomie Harris; Mahershala Ali
- Cinematography: James Laxton
- Edited by: Nat Sanders; Joi McMillon
- Music by: Nicholas Britell
- Production companies: A24; Plan B Entertainment; Pastel Productions
- Distributed by: A24
- Release dates: September 2, 2016 (Telluride); October 21, 2016 (United States)
- Running time: 111 minutes
- Country: United States
- Language: English
- Budget: $1.5–4 million
- Box office: $67 million

Moonlight is a 2016 American drama film written and directed by Barry Jenkins, based on Tarell Alvin McCraney's unpublished semi-autobiographical play In Moonlight Black Boys Look Blue. It stars Trevante Rhodes, André Holland, Janelle Monáe in her first film appearance, Ashton Sanders, Jharrel Jerome in his feature film debut, Naomie Harris, and Mahershala Ali.

The film presents three stages in the life of the main character: his childhood, adolescence, and early adult life. It explores the difficulties he faces with his homosexuality and identity as a black homosexual man, including the physical and emotional abuse he endures growing up. Filmed in Miami, Florida, beginning in 2015, Moonlight premiered at the 43rd Telluride Film Festival on September 2, 2016. It was released in the United States on October 21, 2016, by A24, receiving universal acclaim with unanimous praise towards its editing, cinematography, score, Jenkins's direction and screenplay, and handling of the themes of sexuality and masculinity. The performances of Harris and Ali also received widespread acclaim. It grossed $67 million worldwide.

Moonlight has been cited as one of the best films of the 2010s and 21st century. The film won the Academy Award for Best Picture—along with Best Supporting Actor (Ali) and Best Adapted Screenplay—from a total of eight nominations, at the 89th Academy Awards. It was released as the first LGBTQ-themed mass-marketed feature film with an all-black cast and was, at the time of its release, the second-lowest-grossing film domestically (behind The Hurt Locker) to win the Oscar for Best Picture. Joi McMillon became the first black woman to be nominated for an Editing Oscar, and Mahershala Ali became the first Muslim to win an acting Oscar.

== Plot ==
=== I. Little ===
In Liberty City, Miami at the height of the crack epidemic, Afro-Cuban drug dealer Juan finds Chiron, a withdrawn child who goes by the nickname "Little", hiding from bullies in a crackhouse. Juan lets Chiron spend the night with him and his girlfriend Teresa before returning Chiron to his mother Paula. Chiron continues to spend time with Juan, who begins to teach him the basics of life, from which he believes Chiron can benefit.

One night, Juan encounters Paula smoking crack with one of his customers. Juan berates her for neglecting her son, but she rebukes him for selling crack to her in the first place. They argue over Chiron's upbringing; Paula asks if Juan is prepared to explain to Chiron why he gets tormented by his peers, alluding to him being gay. She goes home and takes out her frustration on Chiron.

The next day, Chiron admits to Juan and Teresa that he hates his mother and asks what a "faggot" is. Juan tells him it is "a word used to make gay people feel bad." He tells Chiron there is nothing wrong with being gay and that he should not allow others to mock him. Chiron then asks Juan whether he sells drugs and whether his mother does drugs. After Juan remorsefully answers yes to both questions, Chiron leaves as Juan hangs his head in shame.

=== II. Chiron ===
Now a teenager, Chiron balances avoiding school bully Terrel and spending time with Teresa, who lives alone after Juan's death. Paula, who has turned to prostitution due to her worsening addiction, forces Chiron to give her the money he receives from Teresa. Chiron's childhood friend Kevin tells him about a detention he received for having sex with a girl in a school stairwell. Chiron later dreams about Kevin and the girl having sex in Teresa's backyard, waking with a start. One night, Kevin visits Chiron at the beach near his house. While smoking a blunt together, the two discuss their ambitions and Kevin's nickname for Chiron: "Black." They kiss, and Kevin gives Chiron a handjob.

The next day, Terrel manipulates Kevin into participating in a hazing ritual. Kevin reluctantly punches Chiron until he cannot stand, watching as Terrel and other boys savagely attack him. When the principal urges him to reveal his attackers' identities, Chiron refuses, saying that reporting them will not solve anything. The next day, an enraged Chiron walks into class and smashes a chair over Terrel's head before being restrained. Chiron is arrested and taken from the high school in a police cruiser while Kevin watches.

=== III. Black ===
A year and decade later, now going by "Black", an adult Chiron deals drugs in Atlanta and is an imposing figure in his community. He receives frequent calls from Paula, who asks him to visit her at the drug treatment center where she lives. One morning, Kevin unexpectedly calls and invites Chiron to see him should he ever come to Miami. Chiron visits Paula and stands up to her for neglecting him. Paula apologizes for not loving her son when he needed it most and says she loves him even if he does not love her back. The two tearfully reconcile.

Chiron drives to Miami to visit Kevin at the diner where he works as a cook. Kevin makes a meal for Chiron, who does not respond to questions about his life and how he has seemingly changed. Kevin shares that he had a son with an ex-girlfriend and, after getting out of prison, is fulfilled by his role as a father. Chiron reveals his unexpected drug dealing, which disappoints Kevin, and asks Kevin why he called. Kevin plays "Hello Stranger" by Barbara Lewis on the jukebox, the song that made him think of Chiron.

The two go to Kevin's apartment. Kevin tells Chiron that although his life did not turn out as he had hoped, he is happy, resulting in Chiron admitting that he has not been intimate with anybody since their encounter years ago. As Kevin comforts him, Chiron remembers himself as Little, standing on a beach in the moonlight.

== Cast ==
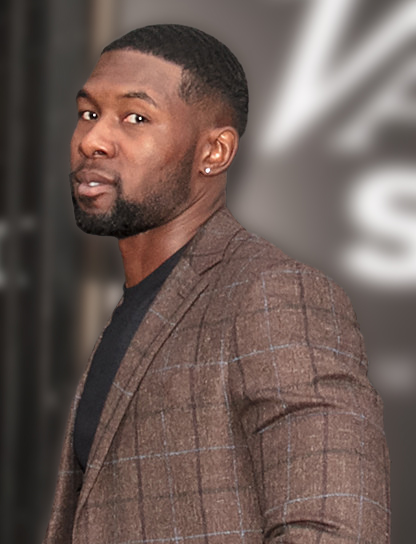
Trevante Rhodes

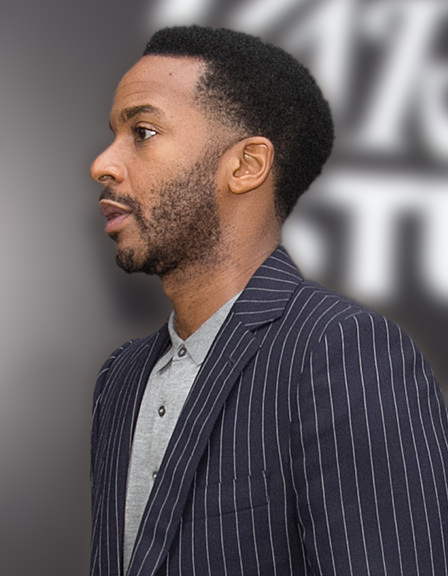
André Holland

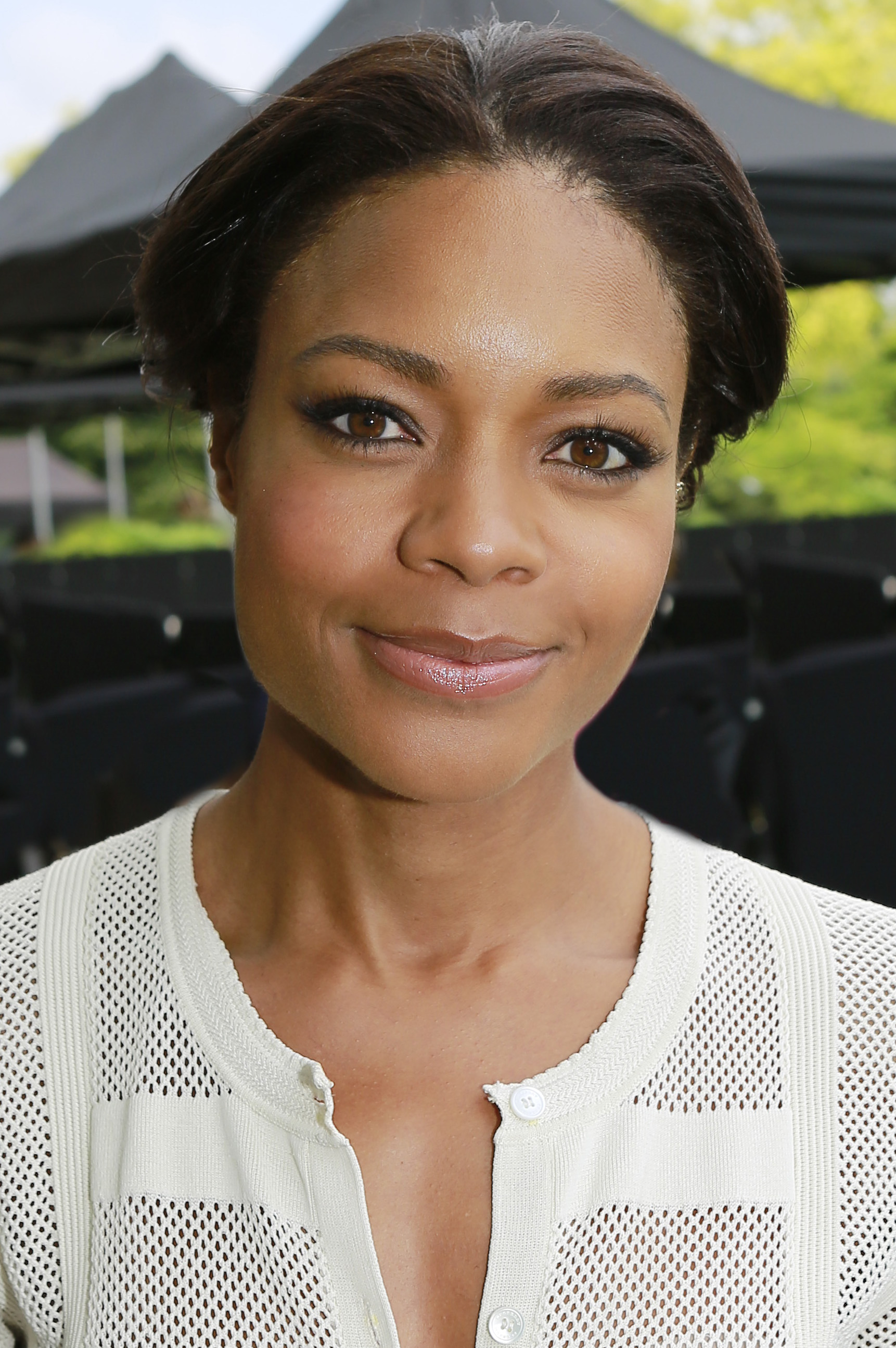
Naomie Harris

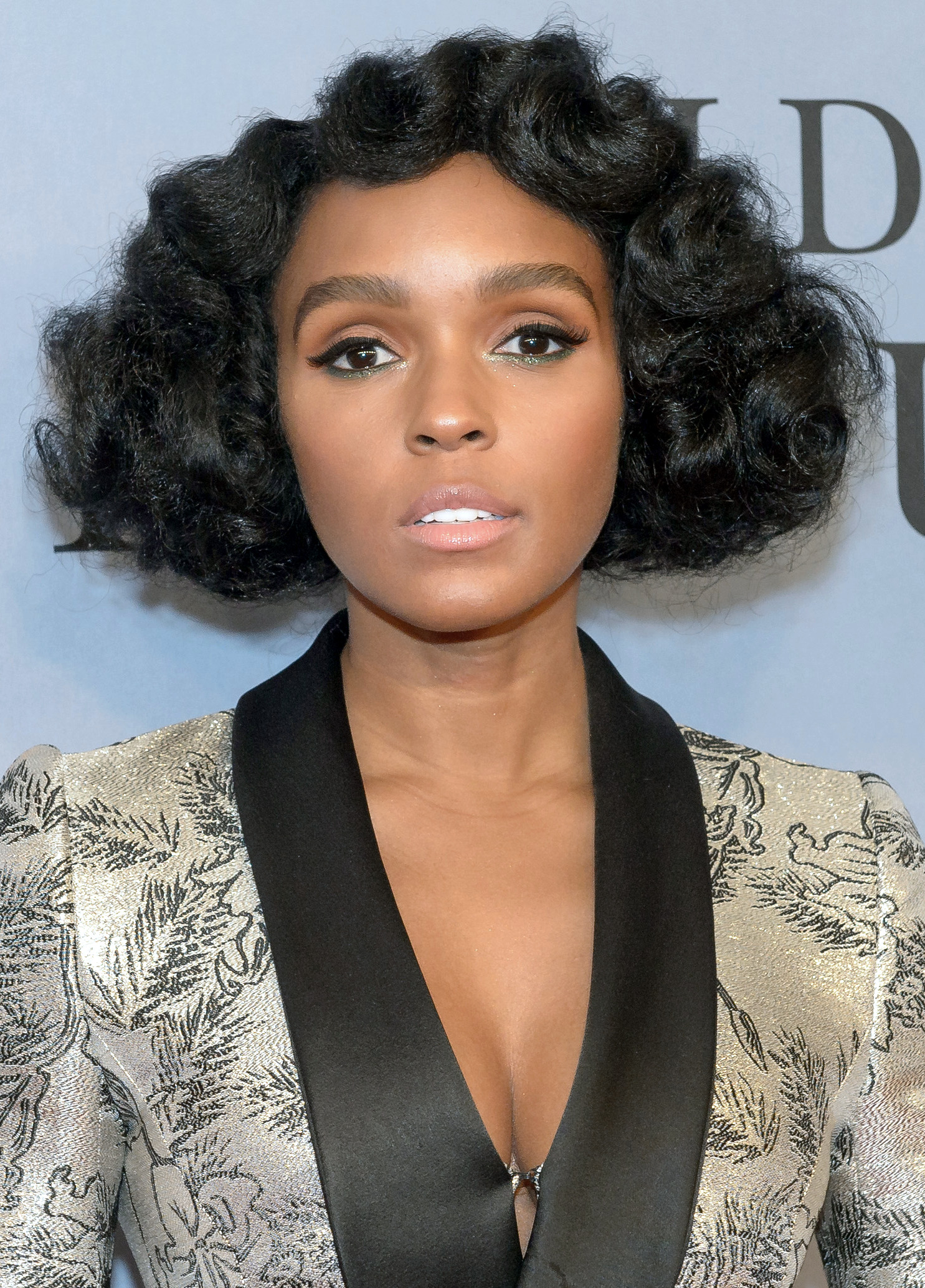
Janelle Monáe

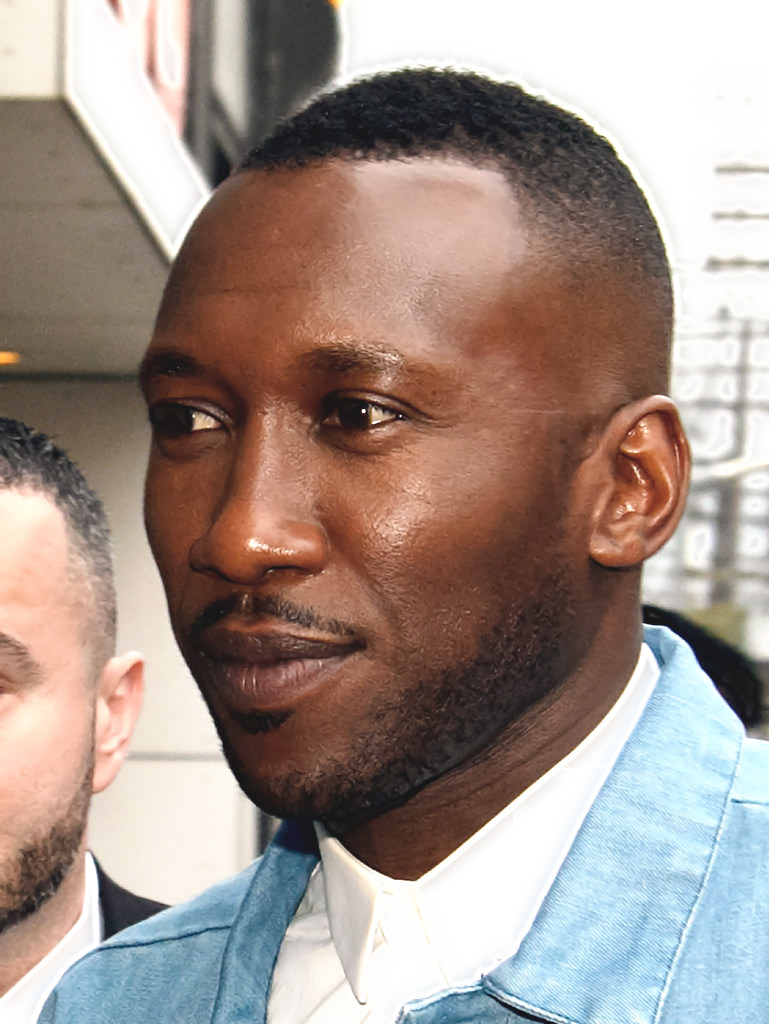
Mahershala Ali

- Chiron Harris (/ʃaɪˈroʊn/ shy-ROHN), the film's protagonist
  - Trevante Rhodes as Adult Chiron / "Black"
  - Ashton Sanders as Teen Chiron
  - Alex Hibbert as Child Chiron / "Little"
- Kevin, Chiron's romantic interest
  - André Holland as Adult Kevin
  - Jharrel Jerome as Teen Kevin
  - Jaden Piner as Child Kevin
- Janelle Monáe as Teresa, Juan's girlfriend
- Naomie Harris as Paula, Chiron's drug addict mother
- Mahershala Ali as Juan, a drug dealer who becomes a father figure to Chiron
- Patrick Decile as Terrel, a school bully

== Production ==
=== Development ===
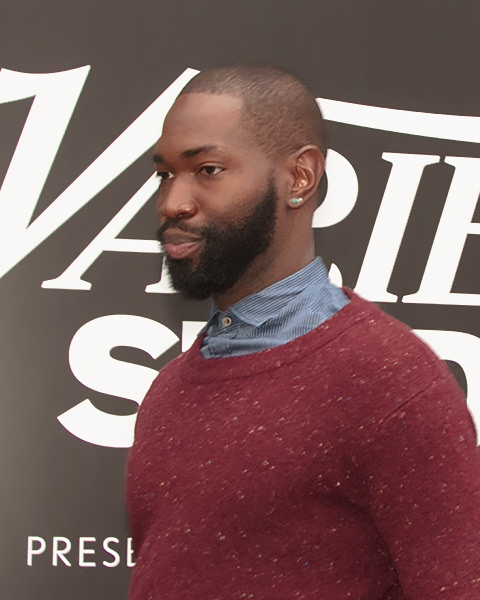
Tarell Alvin McCraney at the 2016 Toronto International Film Festival

In 2003, Tarell Alvin McCraney wrote the semi-autobiographical play In Moonlight Black Boys Look Blue to cope with his mother's death from AIDS. The theater piece was shelved for about a decade before it served as the basis for Moonlight.

After the release of his debut feature film Medicine for Melancholy in 2008, Barry Jenkins wrote various screenplays, none of which entered production. In January 2013, producer Adele Romanski urged Jenkins to make a second film. The two brainstormed a few times a month through video-chat, with the goal of producing a low-budget "cinematic and personal" film. Jenkins was introduced to McCraney's play through the Borscht arts collective in Miami. After discussions with McCraney, Jenkins wrote the first draft of the film in a month-long visit to Brussels.

Although the original play contained three parts, they ran simultaneously so that the audience would experience a day in the life of Little, Chiron and Black concurrently. In fact, it is not made clear that the characters are the same person until halfway through the play. Jenkins instead chose to split the three parts of the original piece into distinct chapters and to focus on Chiron's story from the perspective of an ally.

The result was a screenplay that reflected the similar upbringings of Jenkins and McCraney. The character Juan was based on the father of McCraney's half-brother, who was also a childhood "defender" of McCraney, as Juan was for Chiron. Likewise, Paula was a depiction of Jenkins' and McCraney's mothers, who both were drug addicts. McCraney and Jenkins also both grew up in Miami's Liberty Square, a primary location of the film.

Jenkins looked for financing for the film during 2013, finding success after showing the script to the executives of Plan B Entertainment at the year's Telluride Film Festival. Dede Gardner and Jeremy Kleiner of Plan B Entertainment became producers of the film, while A24 undertook to finance it and handle worldwide distribution, which marked the company's first production.

=== Casting ===
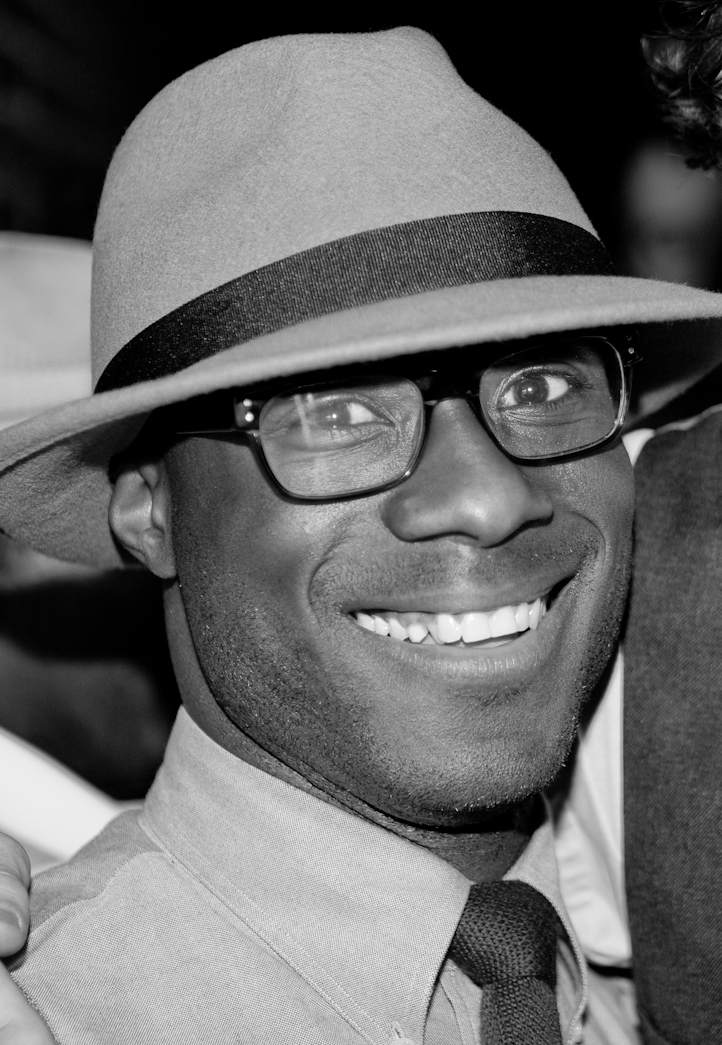
Screenwriter and director Barry Jenkins

Different actors portrayed Chiron and Kevin in each chapter of the film. Ashton Sanders was cast in the role of teen Chiron. Alex Hibbert and Jaden Piner were cast for the roles of child Chiron and child Kevin, respectively, in an open casting call in Miami. Trevante Rhodes originally auditioned for the role of Kevin, before he was cast as adult Chiron.

André Holland had previously acted in McCraney's plays, and had read In Moonlight Black Boys Look Blue a decade before the release of the film. Holland was attracted to the role of adult Kevin when later reading the script of the film, stating, "[The script] was the best thing I've ever read".

Naomie Harris was initially reluctant to portray Paula, stating that she did not want to play a stereotypical depiction of a black woman. When addressing her concerns, Jenkins emphasized the character's representation of both his and McCraney's mothers. Harris later commented that although she had previously vowed not to portray a crack addict, the film's script and director's tolerance appealed to her. In preparation for her role, Harris watched interviews of those with addiction to crack cocaine, and met with addicted women. She related her experiences of bullying to the addicts' attempts of escaping trauma.

Romanski proposed Juan be played by Mahershala Ali, who had a role in one of her previously produced films, Kicks. Jenkins was hesitant when casting Ali due to his role as Remy Danton in House of Cards; however, he was convinced after witnessing Ali's acting range and understanding of his character. Ali considered the role an important opportunity to portray an African-American male mentor, and drew on his experiences of "[growing] up with a Juan". Janelle Monáe was sent the script and immediately connected to her role as Teresa, commenting that she too had family members with similar struggles relating to drugs and sexual identity.

=== Filming ===
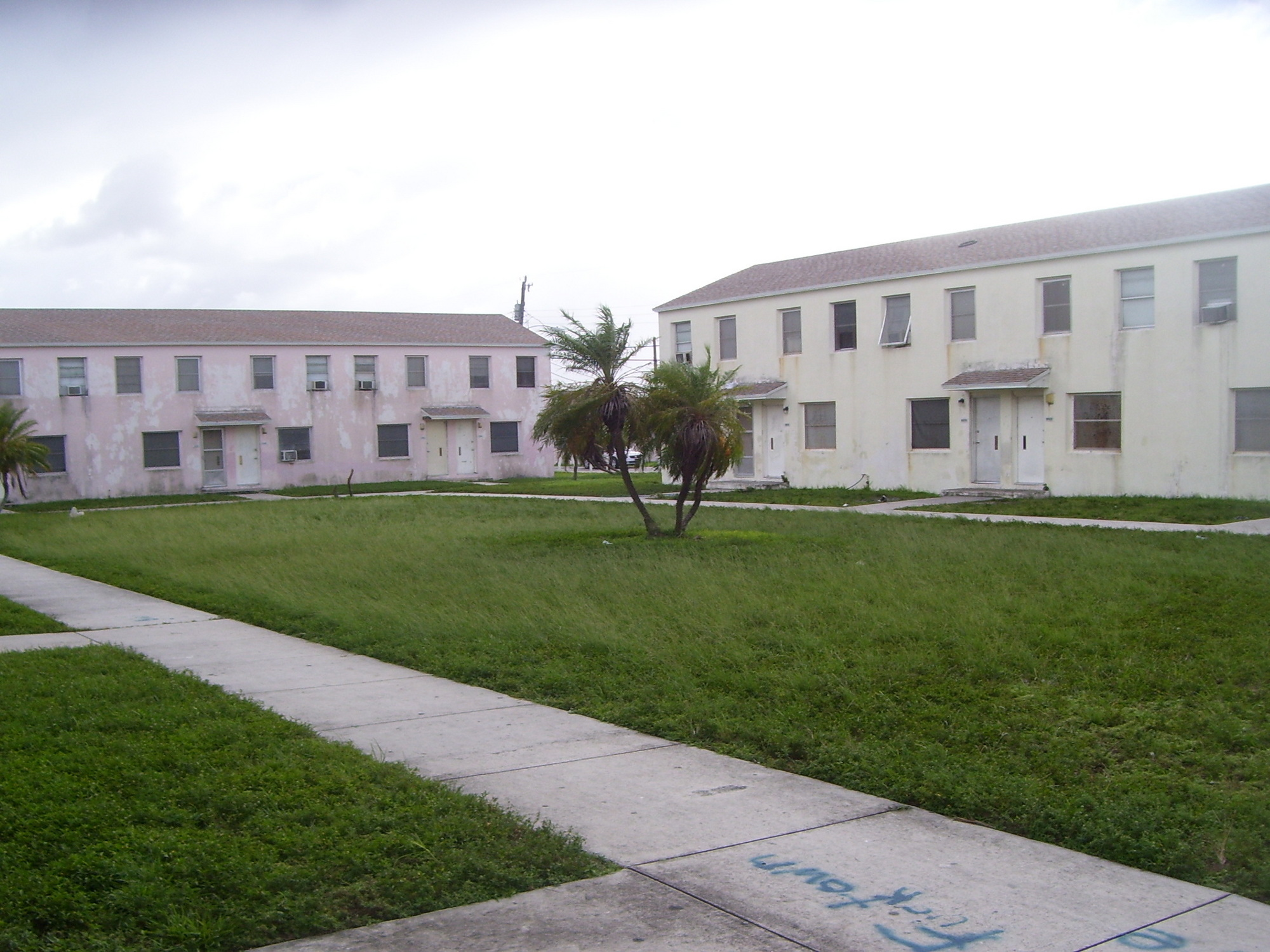
Part of the film was shot in the Liberty Square housing project.

Filming began on October 14, 2015, in Miami, Florida. Despite Florida's not having tax incentives for film productions, Moonlight's creative team was able to shoot in Florida with support from its financiers. Had the production relocated to a different state with legislative incentives, the film's budget might have provided up to 30% more resources. The decision to film in Florida was made to maintain authenticity as a Florida based story.

After scouting for locations in Miami with Romanski, Jenkins made an effort to film in locations where he previously lived. Liberty Square, a housing project located in the neighborhood of Liberty City, was chosen as one of the primary locations as both McCraney and Jenkins grew up in the area. The film was shot undisturbed since Jenkins had relatives living in the area, though the cast and crew had police escorts. Naomie Harris later reflected:

It was the first time someone had come to their community and wanted to represent it onscreen, and since Barry Jenkins had grown up in that area, there was this sense of pride and this desire to support him. You felt this love from the community that I've never felt in any other location, anywhere in the world, and it was so strange that it happened in a place where people were expecting the complete opposite.

During filming, Jenkins made sure that the three actors for Chiron did not meet each other until after filming to avoid any imitations of one another. Consequently, Rhodes, Sanders, and Hibbert filmed in separate two-week periods. Mahershala Ali frequently flew to Miami on consecutive weekends to film during the production of other projects. Naomie Harris shot all of her scenes in three days without rehearsals, while André Holland filmed the totality of his scenes in five. The film was shot in a period of twenty-five days.

Jenkins worked with cinematographer and longtime friend James Laxton, who previously shot Medicine for Melancholy. The two chose to avoid the "documentary look" and thus shot the film using widescreen CinemaScope on an Arri Alexa digital camera, which better rendered skin tone. With colorist Alex Bickel, they further achieved this by creating a color grade that increased the contrast and saturation while preserving the detail and color. As a result, the three chapters of the film were designed to imitate different film stocks. The first chapter emulated the Fuji film stock to intensify the cast's skin tones. The second chapter imitated the Agfa film stock, which added cyan to the images, while the third chapter used a modified Kodak film stock.

=== Editing ===
Post production began in November 2015 and was completed in April 2016. The film was edited in Los Angeles by Joi McMillon and Nat Sanders, former university schoolmates of Jenkins. Sanders was responsible for editing the first and second chapters. McMillon was responsible for the third act which included the "diner scene", a favorite of the cinematographer Laxton.

McMillion and Sanders worked in the same room during editing sessions, and were able to exchange notes and provide feedback to one another throughout post production. Because the film did not need to be ready for any film festival or premiere deadlines, they were able to take ample time in post production. Jenkins was usually present during editing sessions. In McMillion's words, "At certain points Barry and Nat would be working on a section of the film and then say 'Hey Joi turn around and look at this" and then vice versa; when Barry was working with me he'd say, 'Hey Nat, how do you feel about this?'".

Sanders and McMillion made several changes from the script, the most notable being the scene in the third act where Chiron visits his mother. This was meant to be one of the first scenes in the third act, but the editors convinced Jenkins to move it later in the story.

McMillion became the first African-American woman to be nominated for an editing Oscar for her work on the film. She remains the only African-American woman to be nominated in the category.

=== Music ===
The score of Moonlight was composed by Nicholas Britell, who applied the chopped and screwed technique from hip hop remixes to orchestral music, producing a "fluid, bass-heavy score". The soundtrack, released on October 21, 2016, consists of eighteen original cues by Britell along with others by Goodie Mob, Boris Gardiner, and Barbara Lewis. A chopped and screwed version was released by OG Ron C and DJ Candlestick of The Chopstars.

== Themes ==
Peter Bradshaw of The Guardian, lists "love, sex, survival, mothers and father figures" among its themes, particularly the lack of a nurturing father. However, A. O. Scott of The New York Times cites the character Juan as an example of how the film "evokes clichés of African-American masculinity in order to shatter them." In his review in Variety, Peter Debruge suggests that the film demonstrates that the African American identity is more complex than has been portrayed in films of the past. For example, while Juan plays the role of Little's defender and protector, he is also part of the root cause of at least some of the hardship the young boy endures.

A major theme of Moonlight is the black male identity and its interactions with sexual identity. The film takes a form similar to a triptych in order to explore the path of a man from a neglected childhood, through an angry adolescence, to self-realization and fulfillment in adulthood.

This particular story of Chiron's sexuality is also seen as a story of race in a 'post-Obama' era. The film amalgamates art film with hood film in its portrayal of African-American characters on-screen. Many technical film techniques are employed to juxtapose the characters and action on scene, including the use of an orchestral score done in the melody of popular R&B and hip-hop motifs. This specifically deals with the theme of recuperating identity, especially in terms of Blackness. The characters operate in an urban working-class city in Florida but are portrayed through art house conventions to create a new space for Black characters in cinema. This mirrors Chiron's own odyssey to learning who he is, as he constantly struggles with trying to find some essentialism to his identity, yet consistently fails in doing so. The triptych structure helps to reiterate the fragmented personality to the film and Chiron.

=== Black masculinity ===
The film's co-writer, Tarell Alvin McCraney, speaks on the topic of black masculinity in the film, explaining why Chiron went to such lengths to alter his persona. He argues that communities without privilege or power seek to gain it in other ways. He says one way males in such communities do this is by trying to enhance their masculine identity, knowing that it often provides a means to more social control in a patriarchal society.

Masculinity is portrayed as rigid and aggressive throughout the film, apparent in the behavior displayed by the young black men in Chiron's teenage peer group. The expression of hyper-masculinity among black men has been associated with peer acceptance and community. Being a homosexual within the black community, on the other hand, has been associated with social alienation and homophobic judgement by peers because black gay men are seen as weak or effeminate. In the film, Chiron is placed in this divide as a black gay man and alters his presentation of masculinity as a strategy to avoid ridicule because homosexuality is viewed as incompatible with black masculine expectations. As young kids, Kevin hides his sexuality in order to avoid being singled out like Chiron is. As Chiron grows older, he recognizes the need to conform to a heteronormative ideal of black masculinity in order to avoid abuse and homophobia. As an adult, Chiron chooses to embrace the stereotypical black male gender performance by becoming muscular and a drug dealer.

Moonlight explores the effects of this felt powerlessness in black males. As McCraney explains, coping with this feeling often coincides with attempts to overstate one's masculinity, in a way that can easily become toxic. He says one unfortunate side effect of leaning into masculinity too much is that men no longer want to be "caressed, or nurtured, or gentle", which is why a character like Juan may be puzzling to some audiences.

=== Intersection of blackness, masculinity, and vulnerability ===
Blackness, masculinity, and vulnerability are major focuses of this film. In the beach scene with Chiron, Juan, his father figure in the film, emphasizes the importance of black identity. Juan says, "There are black people everywhere. Remember that, okay? No place you can go in the world ain't got no black people. We was the first on this planet." As Juan speaks about the relevance and importance of the black experience, he also thinks about a time in his youth when a stranger told him "in moonlight, black boys look blue." This is an image that the audience gets to see as the director, Barry Jenkins, supplies numerous shots of Chiron in the moonlight. It seems that Juan seems to associate this image with vulnerability, given that he tells Chiron that he eventually shed the nickname "Blue" in order to foster his own identity. The scenes depicting Chiron in the moonlight are almost always the ones in which he's vulnerable, his intimate night on the beach with Kevin included. Throughout the film, this dichotomy between black and blue stands in for that between tough and vulnerable, with the black body often hovering between the two. In Chiron's situation, the black body, which can be seen as inherently vulnerable in American society, must be tough in order to survive, as seen by Chiron's final, very masculine and dominant identity.

== Release ==
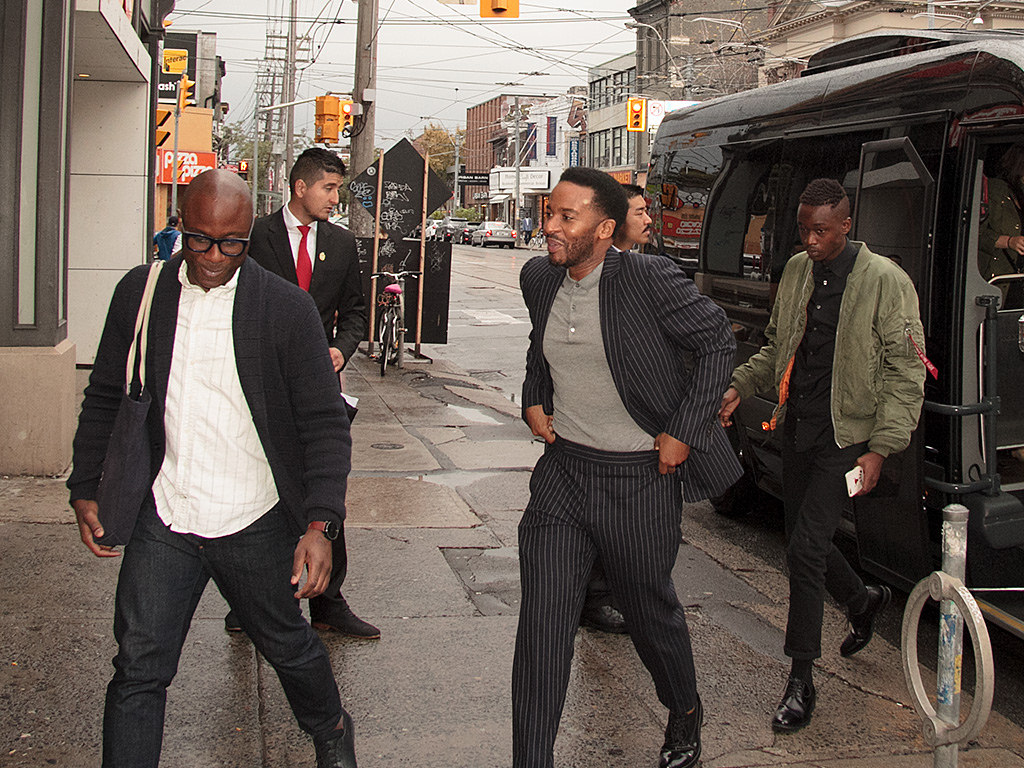
Jenkins, Holland, and Sanders in Toronto

The film had its world premiere at the 43rd Telluride Film Festival on September 2, 2016. It also screened at the Toronto International Film Festival on September 10, 2016, the New York Film Festival on October 2, 2016, the BFI London Film Festival on October 6, 2016 and the Vancouver International Film Festival on October 7, 2016. The film was released to select theaters on October 21, 2016, before beginning a wide release on November 18, 2016. The full UK cinema release was on February 17, 2017.

As part of a partnership between A24 and IMAX, the film was re-released in IMAX theaters on February 26, 2025.

=== Marketing ===
The film's poster reflects its triptych structure, combining the three actors portraying Chiron into a single face. The trailer for the film was released on August 11, 2016, in time for festival season. Mark Olsen of the Los Angeles Times referred to it "as one of the most anticipated films for fall".

On February 27, 2017, the day after the Academy Awards, Calvin Klein released an underwear advertising campaign featuring four of the male actors in the film. On March 7, 2017, Beijing-based streaming video service iQiyi announced that it has acquired the rights to stream the film in China. The film is also available in home media format through iTunes and DVD.

== Reception ==
=== Box office ===
Moonlight grossed $28 million in the United States and Canada and $39 million in other territories for a worldwide gross of $67 million, against a production budget of $1.5 million.

The film originally played in four theaters in its limited October 21, 2016, release, grossing $402,072 (a per-theater average $100,519). The film's theater count peaked at 650 in its wide opening on November 18, 2016, before expanding to 1,014 theaters in February. After the Oscars ceremony, A24 announced that the film would be played at 1,564 theaters. In the weekend following its Oscar wins the film grossed $2.5 million, up 260% from its previous week and marking the highest-grossing weekend of its entire theatrical release. It was also a higher gross than the previous two Best Picture winners, Spotlight ($1.8 million) and Birdman ($1.9 million), had in their first weekend following the Academy Awards.

=== Critical response ===
On Rotten Tomatoes, the film holds an approval rating of 98% based on 402 reviews, with an average rating of 9/10. The website's critical consensus reads, "Moonlight uses one man's story to offer a remarkable and brilliantly crafted look at lives too rarely seen in cinema." On Metacritic, the film holds a score of 99 out of 100, based on 53 critics, indicating "universal acclaim". On both websites, it was the highest-scoring film released in 2016.

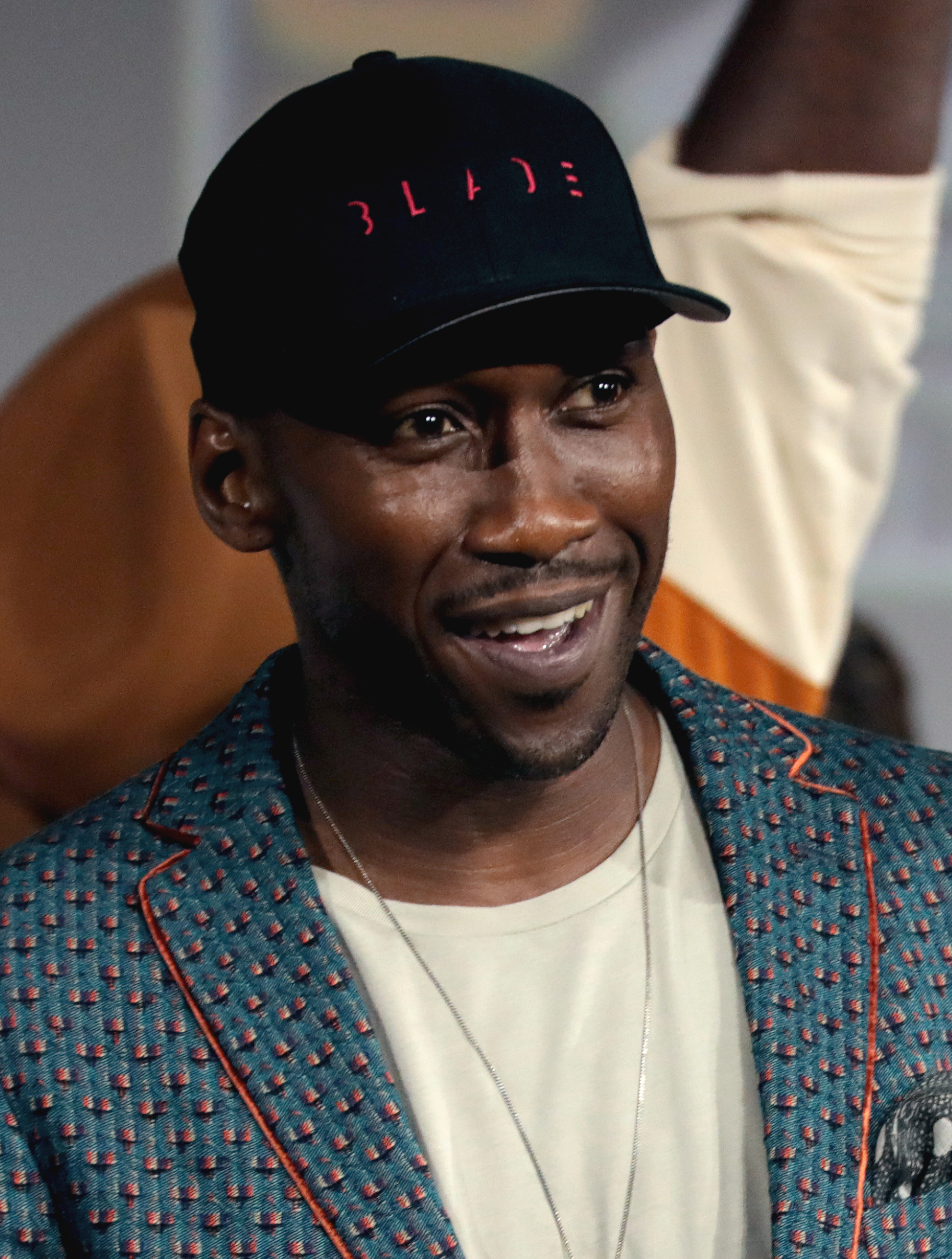
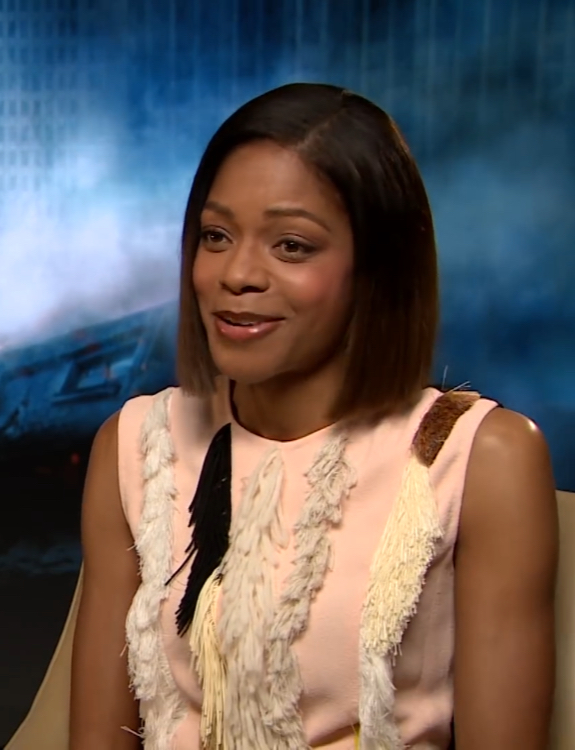
The performances of Mahershala Ali and Naomie Harris were critically acclaimed and nominated for Academy Awards, with Ali winning.

David Rooney of The Hollywood Reporter wrote a positive review after Moonlight premiered at the 2016 Telluride Film Festival. He praised the actors' performances and described the cinematography of James Laxton as "fluid and seductive, deceptively mellow, and shot through with searing compassion". Rooney concluded that the film "will strike plangent chords for anyone who has ever struggled with identity, or to find connections in a lonely world". In a uniformly positive review for Time Out New York, Joshua Rothkopf gave Moonlight five stars out of five and praised Barry Jenkins's direction.

Brian Formo of Collider gave Moonlight an 'A−' grade rating, applauding the performances and direction but contending that the film "is more personal and important than it is great". Similarly, Jake Cole of Slant Magazine praised the acting, but criticized the screenplay, and argued that "so much of the film feels old-hat". In a review for The Verge, Tasha Robinson lamented the plot details omitted between the film's three acts, but wrote that "what does make it to the screen is unforgettable".

While discussing the film after its screening at the 2016 Toronto International Film Festival, Justin Chang of the Los Angeles Times described Moonlight as "achingly romantic and uncommonly wise", and an early Oscar contender. Chang further wrote: "[Barry Jenkins] made a film that urges the viewer to look past Chiron's outward appearance and his superficial signifiers of identity, climbing inside familiar stereotypes in order to quietly dismantle them from within ... [Moonlight] doesn't say much. It says everything".

Writing for The London Review of Books in February 2017, Michael Wood characterized the film as a study of an inherited intergenerational tragedy:

[By the end of the film] there are still ten minutes of late Ingmar Bergman to go. The film keeps showing us Chiron's handsome, inscrutable face. The silence doesn't tell us anything, it just asks us to feel sorry for him ... All is not lost, though, because as we gaze at Chiron, we can think of something else: his resemblance to Juan (his father figure). Does it mean that Juan was once a Chiron ... Not quite that perhaps, but the last shot of the film is of the young Chiron sitting on the beach ... looking out at the ocean ... His wide eyes suggest all the desolation and promise that Juan saw in him at the beginning. If we started again, would things be different?

Camilla Long of The Times wrote that the film's "story has been told countless times, against countless backdrops", and that the film is not "relevant" to a predominantly "straight, white, middle class" audience. Catherine Shoard, however, pointed out that "critics' opinions are subjective, and are supposed to be", but also noted her dismay for Long's "struggle to feel for those who aren't like you." Moreover, David McAlmont of The Huffington Post referred to Long's review as "not a review ... [but] a waspish response to other reviews."

On a list of the top ten lists of the decade on Metacritic, it was tied for the second-most number ones and ranked second in overall mentions on lists of the top ten films of the decade. Moonlight was listed on over 180 critics' top-ten lists for 2016, including 65 first-place rankings and 33 second-place rankings. IndieWire writers ranked Moonlight as the 16th best American screenplay of the 21st century, stating that Jenkins and McCraney "dig deep into three brief moments and ask the audience to make connections [...] the bold and risky choices of the Moonlight screenplay pay off in ways that make this masterpiece only improve with time and repeat viewings." In 2021, members of Writers Guild of America West (WGAW) and Writers Guild of America, East (WGAE) ranked its screenplay 6th in WGA's 101 Greatest Screenplays of the 21st Century (so far). In 2025, the film ranked number 5 on The New York Times' list of "The 100 Best Movies of the 21st Century" and number 18 on the "Readers' Choice" edition of the list. In July 2025, it ranked number 3 on Rolling Stone's list of "The 100 Best Movies of the 21st Century."

=== Accolades ===
At the 74th Golden Globe Awards, Moonlight received six nominations, the second highest of all film nominees. The film won the Golden Globe Award for Best Motion Picture – Drama, with additional nominations for five more: Best Director, Best Supporting Actor (for Ali), Best Supporting Actress (for Harris), Best Screenplay (for Jenkins) and Best Original Score (for Britell).

Moonlight received four nominations at the 70th British Academy Film Awards: Best Film, Best Actor in a Supporting Role, Best Actress in a Supporting Role and Best Original Screenplay.

Moonlight received eight nominations at the 89th Academy Awards, the second highest of all nominees, including Best Picture, Best Director, Best Supporting Actor (for Ali), Best Supporting Actress (for Harris) and Best Adapted Screenplay. The film won three awards: for Best Picture, Best Supporting Actor and Best Adapted Screenplay. At the ceremony, presenter Faye Dunaway read La La Land as the winner of Best Picture. Co-presenter Warren Beatty subsequently stated that he had been mistakenly given the duplicate envelope for the Best Actress award, which Emma Stone had won for her role in La La Land several minutes earlier. When the mistake was realized, La La Land producer Jordan Horowitz came forward to announce Moonlight as the actual winner. The Best Picture envelope is on display at the Academy Museum of Motion Pictures in Los Angeles. Beatty wrote a congratulatory note to Jenkins, which is also on display at the Academy Museum.

During his keynote presentation at the 2018 SXSW Festival, Jenkins read the acceptance speech he had prepared in the event of Moonlight winning Best Picture at the Academy Awards. He had been unable to deliver the intended speech at the ceremony due to the confusion over La La Land being mistakenly announced as the winner.

Because the film's screenplay was based on a play that had not been previously produced or published, different awards had different rules as to whether Moonlight qualified in the original or adapted screenplay categories. It was classified as an original screenplay by both the Writers Guild of America Awards and the BAFTAs, but was ruled an adapted screenplay according to Academy Award rules.

Nat Sanders and Joi McMillon were nominated for Best Film Editing, making McMillon the first black woman to earn an Academy Award nomination in film editing. It is also the first LGBTQ film to win Best Picture at the Academy Awards.

=== Cultural impact ===
The film is referenced in "Moonlight", a song from Jay-Z's 2017 studio album 4:44. In the closing of The Simpsons episode "Haw-Haw Land" it is stated that the episode was supposed to be a parody of the film rather than La La Land (itself parodying the mistake at the 89th Academy Awards).

== See also ==
- List of Black Academy Award winners and nominees
- List of hood films – Film genre originating in the United States
- List of LGBT-related films
- List of LGBTQ Academy Award winners and nominees
- New queer cinema – Movement in queer-themed independent filmmaking
