= The Enemy Within (TV series) =

2019 American drama television series

- Genre: Drama
- Created by: Ken Woodruff
- Starring: Jennifer Carpenter; Morris Chestnut; Raza Jaffrey; Cassandra Freeman; Kelli Garner; Noah Mills
- Composer: Bobby Krlic
- Country of origin: United States
- Original language: English
- No. of seasons: 1
- No. of episodes: 13

Production
- Executive producers: Ken Woodruff; Mark Pellington; Vernon Sanders
- Production locations: Bergen Community College, Bergen County, New Jersey; Meadowlands Arena, East Rutherford, New Jersey
- Cinematography: James Hawkinson; Frank Prinzi; Frankie DeMarco
- Editors: Finnian Murray; Mike Banas; Leon Martin; Elba Sanchez-Short; Chris Cibelli; James Kilton; Cary Israel; Nick Towle; Michael Ruscio
- Running time: 43–44 minutes
- Production companies: 82nd West; Universal Television

Original release
- Network: NBC
- Release: February 25 – May 20, 2019

The Enemy Within is an American drama television series created by Ken Woodruff, which aired on NBC from February 25 to May 20, 2019. The series was cancelled after one season on May 30, 2019.

== Plot ==
In 2015, Erica Shepherd is the CIA Deputy Director of Operations. When Russian master terrorist Mikhail Vassily Tal threatens her daughter Hannah, Erica is forced to reveal the names of four agents: Steven Haibach, Nyimbili Eliya, Desiree Villareal, and Laine Heffron. The agents are killed, and Erica is arrested by FBI agent Will Keaton and sentenced to 15 consecutive life sentences without possibility of parole. Three years later, Tal strikes again, and Keaton is ordered to bring Erica out of ADX Florence to join the hunt for Tal and his growing network of spies.

== Cast and characters ==
=== Main ===
- Jennifer Carpenter as Erica J. Shepherd, a brilliant codebreaker and former CIA Deputy Director of Operations, serving life in prison for espionage and treason. She is recruited by Will Keaton to stop terrorist Mikhail Tal.
- Morris Chestnut as Will Keaton, the FBI special agent in charge of the hunt for Tal, and a rising star in the FBI Counterintelligence Division. The agent who arrested Shepherd, he reluctantly enlists her help in hopes of avenging his fiancée Laine.
- Raza Jaffrey as Daniel Zain, an FBI interrogator and Keaton's confidant.
- Kelli Garner as Kate Ryan, a technical analyst with the FBI Cyber Division.
- Cassandra Freeman as Jaquelyn Pettigrew, a training instructor at the FBI Academy.
- Noah Mills as Jason Bragg, an FBI agent and former Army Ranger.

=== Recurring ===
- Lev Gorn as Mikhail Vassily Tal, a former Russian SVR agent and the elusive mastermind behind a series of terrorist attacks against the United States with a network of hidden operatives. Until "Decoded," only his voice is heard (provided by an uncredited Alex Feldman).
- Coral Peña as Anna Cruz, a junior CIA analyst who works as a mole for Tal.
- James Carpinello as Anthony Cabrera, the CIA's new Deputy Director of Operations.
- Sophia Gennusa as Hannah Shepherd, Erica's daughter.
- Noah Bean as Christopher Shepherd, Erica's ex-husband.

=== Guest ===
- Edward Akrout as International Assassin Aslan Aksoy.
- John Finn as Richard Bregman, the FBI's Assistant Director of Counterintelligence and Keaton's superior.
- Florencia Lozano as Elizabeth Cordova, the Deputy Director of National Intelligence.
- Kathleen McNenny as Grace Molinero, the Deputy Director of the Federal Bureau of Investigation who distrusts Shepherd.
- Pawel Szajda as Victor Nemec, one of Tal's top lieutenants who was responsible for killing Steven Haibach and Desiree Villareal. He was later killed by Anna Cruz.
- Chelsea Watts as Laine Heffron, a CIA agent and Keaton's fiancée who was killed in a plane crash orchestrated by Tal.
- Robert Gossett as Thomas Heffron, Laine's father.
- Michael O'Keefe as Paul Backus, a National Security Advisor that is on Tal's side.
- Ana Kayne as Carla Mendoza, Tal's top lieutenant and confidant.
- Michael Braun as Dr. Alan Novak, a physician in Tal's organization.
- Dale Pavinsky as Alexander Chigorin, Tal's senior lieutenant who was responsible for Laine's death and was recruited by Tal when he was just a teenager.
- Michael James Shaw as Desmond Visser, a commando-turned-independent security analyst who only met Tal through transaction.
- Margaret Colin as Evelyn Bell, a former CIA black ops-turned-congresswoman from Florida who used Erica's conviction to start off her political career.

== Episodes ==
No.	Title	Directed by	Written by	Original release date	U.S. viewers (millions)
1	"Pilot"	Mark Pellington	Ken Woodruff	February 25, 2019	5.76
In 2015, CIA Deputy Director of Operations Erica Shepherd is arrested by FBI Agent Will Keaton following the deaths of four of her agents, including Keaton’s fiancée Laine, and is convicted of aiding terrorist Mikhail Tal. Three years later, Tal orchestrates another attack, and Keaton is ordered to recruit the incarcerated Shepherd onto his team, including FBI agents Daniel Zain, Kate Ryan, and Jason Bragg. Shepherd’s deductive abilities and knowledge of tradecraft lead the team to Victor Nemec, one of Tal’s operatives who has kidnapped CIA analyst Anna Cruz. Shepherd escapes custody to see her daughter and is recaptured, while Keaton arrests Nemec and rescues Cruz. Shepherd tells Keaton the truth about her treasonous choice: in a flashback, she receives a call from Tal, who forces her to give up her agents by threatening her daughter’s life. Shepherd reveals that Tal has thousands of highly-trained spies in the United States. Cruz receives a call from Tal, revealing herself as his mole.
2	"Black Bear"	Charles Beeson	Ken Woodruff	March 4, 2019	5.32
On a commuter train outside Richmond, Virginia, Tal’s operatives seize a laptop and password from former CIA agent Dean Merriman before killing him. Shepherd agrees to assist Keaton’s investigation in exchange for guaranteeing her daughter Hannah’s protection. At Merriman’s storage unit, they discover he was also investigating Tal and fend off another operative. Despite Zain’s interrogation, Nemec remains uncooperative and Cruz spies on Keaton’s investigation. Shepherd is allowed to see Hannah, but is unable to tell her the truth: that she only betrayed her agents in order to save Hannah. Shepherd and Agent Ryan realize that the codename “Black Bear” in Merriman’s files refers to his coworker Beverly Brooks. Tal’s men storm Merriman’s office and Brooks manages to download Merriman’s secret files from the office server before being rescued by Keaton’s team. She tells Keaton her suspicion that Merriman’s death is somehow connected to Cuba. Cruz garrotes Nemec in his cell. Hannah finds a secret message from her mother in the hat she dropped.
3	"The Ambassador's Wife"	Richard Lewis	David Appelbaum	March 11, 2019	5.05
A DEA patrol is killed off the coast of Colombia by the Morales drug cartel, who Keaton’s team determine have been sold classified American intel. Shepherd deduces that U.S. Ambassador Dennis Gordon is the cartel’s source, and Agent Bragg recruits FBI instructor Jaquelyn Pettigrew to help investigate Gordon. Nemec’s death is ruled a suicide, and Shepherd struggles with her separation from Hannah. Shepherd persuades Gordon’s wife Elizabeth to take down her husband for the sake of their son. Cruz asks to join Keaton’s team, and invites him to a memorial service for her colleagues. During a party at her home, Elizabeth plants a tracker on the DEA file but is discovered by Dennis. As the FBI raid the house, Elizabeth holds Dennis at gunpoint. He tries to seize the gun and is fatally shot when it goes off. Keaton assures Elizabeth that she acted in self-defense. Joining Cruz at the CIA Memorial Wall, Keaton invites her onto the team, and allows Shepherd to leave an emotional voicemail for her daughter, which Hannah listens to over and over.
4	"Confessions"	David Boyd	Jason Wilborn	March 18, 2019	4.34
International assassin Aksoy is detained at a US-Canada border checkpoint, but subdues the CBP agents and makes his way into the United States. In a flashback, Shepherd is on trial with Keaton, Laine's father Thomas, Hannah, and Shepherd's husband Christopher present. She is sentenced to life in prison at ADX Florence without possibility of parole. In the present, Shepherd alerts the team to Aksoy’s prowess with poisons and bomb-making. FBI Deputy Director Grace Molinero questions Shepherd’s inclusion on Keaton’s team, which now includes Pettigrew and Cruz. Shepherd reconnects with Hannah, and the team tracks Aksoy to the Port of Baltimore; he escapes with MRI components. Thomas confronts Keaton over his collaboration with Shepherd. Senator Martin Covington arrives at BWI Airport, where Aksoy, posing as a baggage handler, uses the MRI coil to create a portable EMP, disrupting air traffic control and grounding all flights. The team searches the airport, and Keaton subdues Aksoy after he sprays the senator with a toxin. Aksoy is taken into custody and the senator is successfully treated. Cruz tries to access classified files on Tal. Believing Shepherd tried to hack the files, Keaton confronts her, and she tells him Cruz is Tal’s mole.
5	"Havana"	Martha Mitchell	Andi Bushell	March 25, 2019	5.10
While planting false evidence at a cabin in Elkins, West Virginia, Cruz murders a nosy neighbor. Shepherd tells Keaton that she baited Cruz with Tal’s files. Keaton surprises Cruz at her apartment, where her lack of personal belongings convinces him she is a spy. The team prepares to turn Cruz as an asset, while Shepherd is haunted by memories of failing to protect a past asset. Luring Cruz into meeting Zain in a SCIF room, the team clones her cell phone. Shepherd suspects Cruz was groomed as Tal’s spy from a young age. Cruz invites Keaton to follow up on a lead in Elkins with her; despite the team’s misgivings, Keaton accepts. As they reach the cabin, Cruz realizes she has been made, and holds Keaton at gunpoint. Just as he persuades her to turn against Tal and start a new life, Cruz is killed by Tal’s operative Ray Fontaine, who is then killed by Keaton. Answering Cruz’s phone, Keaton finds himself speaking to Tal, who insinuates that Cruz was not his only spy within the FBI.
6	"Eye of Horus"	Ben Bray	Tony Camerino	April 1, 2019	4.38
A bomb detonates in Jersey City, killing eight civilians. The team uses Cruz’s phone to track Tal’s mobile network, leading to the capture of his communications expert Sam Malek. They learn Tal’s operatives have stolen enough ammonium nitrate to build nine more bombs. Malek agrees to cooperate in exchange for the name of the man who killed his girlfriend Nadia, a protest leader in the Arab Spring, after she was apprehended by the Mukhabarat. The team black-bags Gamal, an Egyptian contact of Shepherd’s, who informs her Nadia’s killer died in a car accident two years ago. Satisfied, Malek points the team to international investment firm Crossroads Bank, a front for CIA black ops. The team evacuate the building, and Keaton and Bragg subdue Tal’s men and circumvent the bombs. Malek gives Daniel Nadia’s Eye of Horus pin. Disturbed that the agency was compromised by Cruz, Deputy Director Molinero threatens to end Keaton’s task force in the event of another mistake. Shepherd, accompanied by Keaton, is allowed to attend her daughter’s piano recital.
7	"Decoded"	Melanie Mayron	Matt Corman & Chris Ord	April 8, 2019	4.11
NSA analyst Jane Eaton, a spy for Tal, steals a piece of financial cloaking software and is killed in a car crash trying to avoid a deer. Keaton’s team recovers the software and an encrypted message from Tal, which Shepherd decodes as the location where Eaton was to deliver the software. There, Shepherd poses as Eaton and hands off the software to Braden Decker, an unwitting cutout. He uploads the software to Tal, who the team realize is in the United States. Tal meets with an ally in Washington, D.C. and places a contract on Decker’s life. Keaton decides to protect Decker at the risk of alerting Tal. The team follows Decker to a racetrack where a hacker friend offers to buy the software, but Decker refuses. Bragg neutralizes one hitman and Pettigrew is wounded by another as Keaton and Zain track Tal to a warehouse but arrive too late. Tal’s ally is revealed to be the National Security Advisor Paul Backus who assures Tal that he will prevent further FBI interference. Shepherd uses a stolen cell phone to tell a contact in Russia that she needs to speak with Tal.
8	"An Offer"	Jono Oliver	Ken Woodruff	April 15, 2019	3.89
In a flashback to 2015, Shepherd and Cabrera monitor a CIA operation in Croatia; the mission is compromised, but Agents Desiree Villareal and Steven Haibach escape with vital documents. The aftermath of Tal’s call to Shepherd is revealed: after blowing her four agents’ covers to save her daughter, Shepherd tracks Hannah’s cell phone to a park and learns Hannah was picked up by Tal’s operatives posing as police officers. Meanwhile, Haibach, Villareal, and Agent Brian Lanich are killed and Nemec retrieves the documents. Shepherd subdues and wounds another operative tailing her who tells her Hannah has been returned home. There, Shepherd is confronted by Tal himself, who offers to free her eventually from her inevitable incarceration in exchange for her future assistance. Keaton is informed by Director Mayer that Laine’s airplane has gone down with no survivors. Two weeks later, he, Zain, and Ryan uncover Shepherd’s role in the agents’ deaths. Keaton confronts Shepherd at Laine’s memorial ceremony with a veiled warning, and later arrests her near the United States Capitol on her way to pick up Hannah. In the present, Shepherd calls Tal from her cell and offers her help, declaring that she is “not going to die in a cage.”
9	"Homecoming"	Lily Mariye	David Appelbaum & Erin Donovan	April 22, 2019	3.91
Tal’s operatives rescue Carla Mendoza, one of his top lieutenants, from a CIA convoy in Norfolk, Virginia. Mendoza is shot but escapes, aided by a CIA contractor. Alan Novak, a doctor in Tal’s organization, offers to help the CIA recapture Mendoza, and demands to speak with an agent he made contact with four years earlier – an alias of Shepherd, who is brought to Langley for the first time since her arrest. Keaton’s team identifies the rogue contractor as Luke Bowman, an expert extraction specialist. Shepherd deduces that the CIA is preparing a high-level operation in Cuba. Keaton’s team find Bowman, who is killed by Bragg to save a hostage. Novak is summoned to treat Mendoza; the CIA follows but Novak disappears. Bowman’s phone directs them to another location; Keaton and Shepherd infiltrate the house, and the FBI captures Mendoza and places Novak and his family in witness protection. Keaton trades Mendoza to Cabrera in exchange for sharing information: Tal’s captured operatives are being held at a CIA black site in the Sierra Maestra, which Dean Merriman was researching. Keaton reaches out to Laine’s father. Mendoza briefly breaks free from the guards and warns Shepherd to prove herself to Tal soon.
10	"Chigorin"	David Tuttman	Andi Bushell & Aireka Muse	April 29, 2019	3.68
A plane carrying executives of Alcon International, a CIA defense contractor, is mysteriously rerouted. Keaton’s team boards the plane to find the executives dead, while the assassins escape with a laptop. The team finds Alcon consultant Kathy Hong, meant to be on the flight and now on the run with bodyguards, and bring her in. They learn Tal is after a laptop with files on a self-sustaining facility, which Keaton and Shepherd realize is the Sierra Maestra black site. The air traffic control recording of the flight’s takeoff reveals that the pilot is the same assassin responsible for the plane crash that killed Laine, and Shepherd’s previous investigation uncovers his name: Alexander Chigorin, Tal's senior lieutenant. Shepherd’s ex-husband Christopher confronts her for meeting with Hannah behind his back and the trauma Shepherd’s arrest caused her family. The FBI tracks Chigorin to an underground Russian social club. Recalling Mendoza’s warning, Shepherd sends a call which warns Tal’s network and Chigorin narrowly escapes Keaton, leaving the laptop. The files confirm the Sierra Maestra facility. After confronting Cabrera about the missing black box from Laine’s flight, Keaton listens to the recording. Chigorin meets with Tal, who decides to bring Shepherd in.
11	"The Embassy"	Marisol Adler	Mellori Velasquez & Jason Wilborn	May 6, 2019	3.74
Commando-turned-independent security analyst Desmond Visser awaits a visa at the Swiss embassy in D.C. to flee the country. Keaton’s team prepares an operation to learn what Visser knows of Tal’s plans in Cuba. Molinero tells Pettigrew that Shepherd once withheld information on an operation, endangering the mission and Shepherd’s own life; in a flashback, Shepherd evades a team of Russian assassins. Bragg and Pettigrew infiltrate an embassy reception monitored by Keaton, Zain, and Shepherd from the embassy’s security room, and the team try unsuccessfully to remotely access Visser’s cell phone. Realizing he has been compromised, Visser takes the ballroom hostage. While Keaton and Zain ready the Hostage Rescue Team, Shepherd steals a cache of weapons and convinces Visser that she is joining his escape. They flee, and Shepherd learns Visser was merely a one-time associate of Tal; with no information on Sierra Maestra, Visser mentions that Tal is planning a massive attack on a major tourist attraction in D.C. Shepherd lets her FBI-implanted transponder lead Keaton’s team to her and, having surreptitiously disarmed Visser, he is taken into custody. Pettigrew declines to spy on the team for Molinero while Shepherd shares Visser’s information with Keaton.
12	"Sequestered"	Andrew McCarthy	Matt Corman & Chris Ord	May 13, 2019	3.67
In a flashback, Tal recruits Paul Backus with the promise to make him National Security Advisor. In the present, Visser's information leads Keaton's team to thwart Tal’s attempted assassination of Congresswoman Evelyn Bell. After Backus takes the team off the Tal case, Keaton directs them to investigate Backus. Confronting Bell at an FBI safe house, Keaton and Shepherd deduce she is former CIA black ops. Tal's operatives attack the house and Keaton and Shepherd escape with Bell. She reveals she was part of an operation during the Second Chechen War that recruited Tal. The CIA reneged on its promised extraction and Tal's brothers were killed in an airstrike, catalyzing Tal's vendetta against the CIA. Bell believes Tal's next attack is likely to occur the following day on the anniversary of his brothers' deaths. As Keaton's team prepares a false flag operation to entrap Backus, Molinero interrogates Zain for illegally investigating Backus, but Zain refuses to incriminate Keaton and is suspended until further notice. Lured into arranging another failed attempt on Bell's life, Backus is arrested. Undeterred, Tal and Chigorin prepare for their D.C. attack. After visiting Hannah, possibly for the last time, Shepherd tells Keaton, "Let's end this."
13	"Sierra Maestra"	Steve Shill	Ken Woodruff	May 20, 2019	4.27
Shepherd calls Tal, offering herself as an asset, and is told to join him in Cuba. A raid on Tal’s D.C. hideout turns out to be a trap, and Shepherd persuades Keaton to send her to Cuba alone. Zain deduces that Tal will attack the CIA, and a call to Cabrera reveals the likely target: an agency graduation ceremony. In Havana, Shepherd electrocutes herself to disable her FBI transponder and is brought to meet Tal. Keaton’s team arrives at the ceremony, with all CIA senior leadership in attendance, and Tal’s operatives attack; Keaton and Bragg manage to kill them all, including Chigorin. As Tal’s forces prepare to free his captured operatives from Sierra Maestra, Keaton arrives with a CIA team but is captured. Appearing to have joined Tal, Shepherd shoots Keaton in the clavicle before killing Tal’s remaining men, wounding Tal, and radioing for help. Tal tells Shepherd he was assisted by a powerful individual in U.S. intelligence, and she shoots him dead when he goes for his weapon. One week later, Shepherd attends Hannah’s volleyball game where Keaton arrives to bring her back into custody to continue assisting his team. Shepherd keeps Tal’s revelation to herself.

== Production ==
=== Development ===
On January 22, 2018, it was announced that NBC had given the production a pilot order. The pilot was written by Ken Woodruff who was also expected to executive produce alongside Vernon Sanders. Production companies involved with the pilot were set to include Universal Television. On February 16, 2018, it was reported that Mark Pellington would direct the pilot episode. On May 7, 2018, it was announced that NBC had given the production a series order. It was also reported that Pellington would act as an executive producer for the series. A few days later, it was announced that the series would premiere as a mid-season replacement in the spring of 2019. On December 18, 2018, it was announced that the series would premiere on February 25, 2019 and air weekly on Mondays during the 10 PM time slot. On May 30, 2019, NBC canceled the series after a single season.

=== Casting ===
In February 2018, it was announced that Raza Jaffrey, Jennifer Carpenter, and Morris Chestnut had been cast in lead roles in the pilot. In March 2018, it was reported that Cassandra Freeman and Kelli Garner had joined the main cast. On June 28, 2018, it was announced that Noah Mills had been cast in a series regular role. In December 2018, it was reported that Coral Peña and Robert Gossett would appear in a recurring capacity.

=== Filming ===
In October 2018, filming for the series took place at Bergen Community College in Bergen County, New Jersey. Scenes are also shot on soundstages installed in the East Rutherford Meadowlands Arena, former home to the New Jersey Devils and New Jersey Nets, now known as the Brooklyn Nets.

== Reception ==
=== Ratings ===
Viewership and ratings per episode of The Enemy Within
No.	Title	Air date	Rating/share (18–49)	Viewers (millions)	DVR (18–49)	DVR viewers (millions)	Total (18–49)	Total viewers (millions)
1	"Pilot"	February 25, 2019	1.2/6	5.76	0.6	3.19	1.8	8.95
2	"Black Bear"	March 4, 2019	0.9/4	5.32	0.7	3.11	1.6	8.43
3	"The Ambassador's Wife"	March 11, 2019	0.9/4	5.05	0.7	2.99	1.6	8.05
4	"Confessions"	March 18, 2019	0.8/4	4.34	0.6	3.22	1.4	7.56
5	"Havana"	March 25, 2019	0.8/4	5.10	0.6	2.81	1.4	7.91
6	"Eye of Horus"	April 1, 2019	0.8/4	4.38	0.6	2.91	1.4	7.30
7	"Decoded"	April 8, 2019	0.6/3	4.11	0.6	2.86	1.2	6.97
8	"An Offer"	April 15, 2019	0.6/3	3.89	0.5	2.69	1.1	6.58
9	"Homecoming"	April 22, 2019	0.6/3	3.91	0.5	2.69	1.1	6.60
10	"Chigorin"	April 29, 2019	0.6/3	3.68	0.6	2.67	1.2	6.35
11	"The Embassy"	May 6, 2019	0.6/3	3.74	0.4	2.49	1.0	6.23
12	"Sequestered"	May 13, 2019	0.6/3	3.67	Unknown	Unknown	Unknown	Unknown
13	"Sierra Maestra"	May 20, 2019	0.6/3	4.27	0.5	2.48	1.1	6.75

=== Critical response ===
On review aggregator Rotten Tomatoes, the series holds an approval rating of 43% based on 14 reviews, with an average rating of 5.33/10. The website's critical consensus reads, "Despite a set of stellar performances led by the capable Jennifer Carpenter, The Enemy Within stumbles into an overly formulaic narrative that fails to produce any real spark." On Metacritic, it has a weighted average score of 55 out of 100, based on 10 critics, indicating "mixed or average reviews".
