= The Future of Film Is Female =

Nonprofit organization and film distribution company

The Future Of Film Is Female
- Industry: Film industry
- Founder: Caryn Coleman
- Website: www.futureoffilmisfemale.com

The Future of Film Is Female is a nonprofit organization and film distribution company founded by Caryn Coleman.

== History ==
In 2018, Caryn Coleman launched The Future of Film Is Female, a non-profit organization which offers grants to women and non-binary filmmakers to complete production and post-production on short films. Coleman began selling t-shirts with the company's name, with the profits going to fund the program.

In 2024, the organization launched a distribution division with The Graduates directed by Hannah Peterson. It will also distribute Sunfish (& Other Stories on Green Lake) by Sierra Falconer.

In April 2025, the organization partnered with Neon to finance short films revolving around life in Los Angeles.

The organization has supported the works of Chloë Levine, Hannah Peterson, Gabrielle A. Moses, Elizabeth Rao, Brydie O'Connor, Alexandra Pechman, Sophy Romvari, Raven Jackson, Amber Sealey, Natalie Jasmine Harris, Alessandra Lacorazza Samudio, Aurora Brachman and LaTajh Weaver.
