= Alex R. Hibbert =

American actor

- Born: July 4, 2004 (age 22); New York City, U.S.
- Occupation: Actor
- Years active: 2016–present

Alex R. Hibbert (born July 4, 2004) is an American actor. He is best known for playing "Little" in Moonlight (2016) and Kevin Williams on The Chi.

== Early life ==
Hibbert was born in New York City, and relocated with his mother to Miami, Florida, in 2011. Hibbert attended Norland Middle School in Miami Gardens.

== Career ==
In 2016, Hibbert's middle school drama teacher suggested that he audition for the film Moonlight which was filming in Miami. Hibbert was cast as "Little", the youngest iteration of the film's protagonist Chiron.

In 2017, he was cast on the Showtime series The Chi as Kevin Williams.

In 2023, he was cast as Ed2, the son of protagonist Ed, in Good Burger 2.

In 2018, he featured in the blockbuster movie Black Panther, where he had a small role towards the end of the movie.

== Filmography ==
Television
Year	Title	Role	Notes
2018–2023	The Chi	Kevin Williams	Main role

Film
Year	Title	Role	Notes
2016	Moonlight	Little	
2018	Black Panther	Young Oakland Kid	
2023	Story Ave	Maurice Moe Hernandeez	
2023	The Graduates	Ben	
2023	Good Burger 2	Ed 2	
