= 44th Daytime Emmy Awards =

- Official poster
- Awarded for: Outstanding achievement in all fields of daytime television
- Date: April 30, 2017
- Location: Pasadena Civic Auditorium; Pasadena, California, U.S.
- Presented by: National Academy of Television Arts and Sciences
- Hosted by: Mario Lopez; Sheryl Underwood
- Preshow host: Carolyn Hennesy

Highlights
- Most nominations: The Young and the Restless (25)
- Outstanding Drama Series: General Hospital
- Outstanding Game Show: Jeopardy!
- Website: emmyonline.com/daytime

Television/radio coverage
- Network: Facebook Live; Periscope Producer
- Produced by: Michael Levitt; David Michaels; David Parks

The 44th Daytime Emmy Awards, presented by the National Academy of Television Arts and Sciences (NATAS), "recognizes outstanding achievement in all fields of daytime television production and are presented to individuals and programs broadcast from 2:00 a.m. to 6:00 p.m. during the 2016 calendar year". The ceremony took place on April 30, 2017 at the Pasadena Civic Auditorium, in Pasadena, California, and began at 5:00 p.m. PST / 8:00 p.m. EST. The ceremony, livestreamed in the United States by Facebook Live and Periscope Producer, was executively produced by Michael Levitt, David Parks, and the Senior Vice President of the Daytime Emmy Awards, David Michaels. Actors and television hosts Mario Lopez and Sheryl Underwood hosted the ceremony for the first time.

In related events, the Academy held its 44th Daytime Creative Arts Emmy Awards ceremony also at the Pasadena Civic Auditorium on April 28, 2017. On January 26, 2017, the Lifetime Achievement Award was presented to Mary Hart. Soap Opera Digest reported that former All My Children star Susan Lucci would make an appearance at the ceremony, as part of a segment paying tribute to the serial's creator, Agnes Nixon.

== Category and rule changes ==
The National Academy of Television Arts and Sciences announced and implemented some category and rule changes for the 44th Daytime Emmy Awards:

- For the Blue Ribbon Final round of judging, the pre-nominees of the six Drama performer categories can create a reel of scenes/appearances that have aired during the 2016 calendar year, that is up to four episodes and reaches a length of 20 minutes long. This is a change from last year, where performers were only to submit a 20-minute reel containing just two episodes.
- In the categories of (Outstanding Drama Series Directing Team and Outstanding Drama Series Writing Team, other than one sole episode, the series may now select 2 episodes from the 2016 Calendar year to submit for evaluation.
- Talk Shows categories (Outstanding Talk Show/Entertainment and Outstanding Talk Show/Informative) can now submit any two episodes from the 2016 calendar year, rather than from one single episode as had been done for several previous years.

== Winners and nominees ==
The nominees for the 44th Daytime Emmy Awards were announced on March 22, 2017, during an episode of CBS's daytime talk show The Talk. The Young and the Restless led all nominees with 25 nominations; The Bold and the Beautiful came in second with 23.

=== Awards ===
Winners are listed first, highlighted in boldface, and indicated with a double dagger (‡).

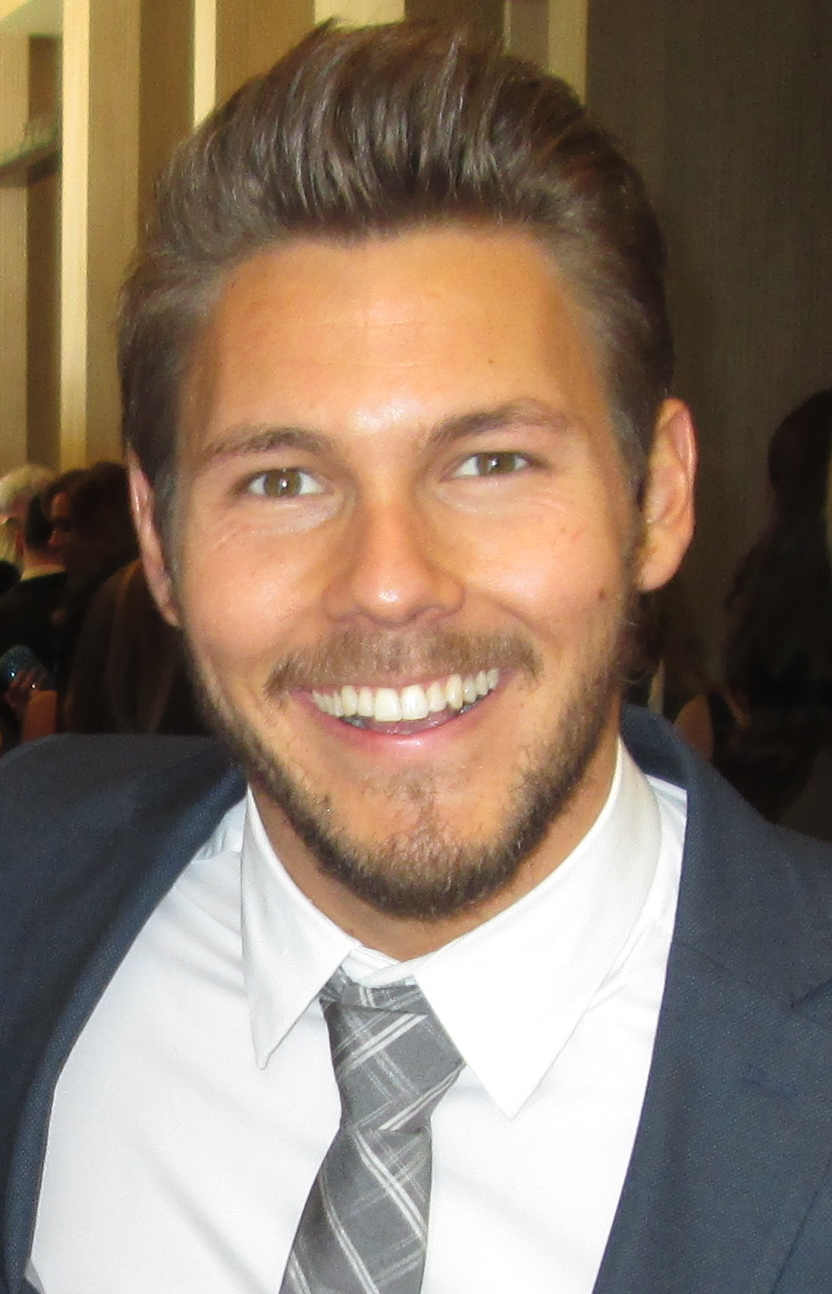
Scott Clifton, Outstanding Lead Actor in a Drama Series winner

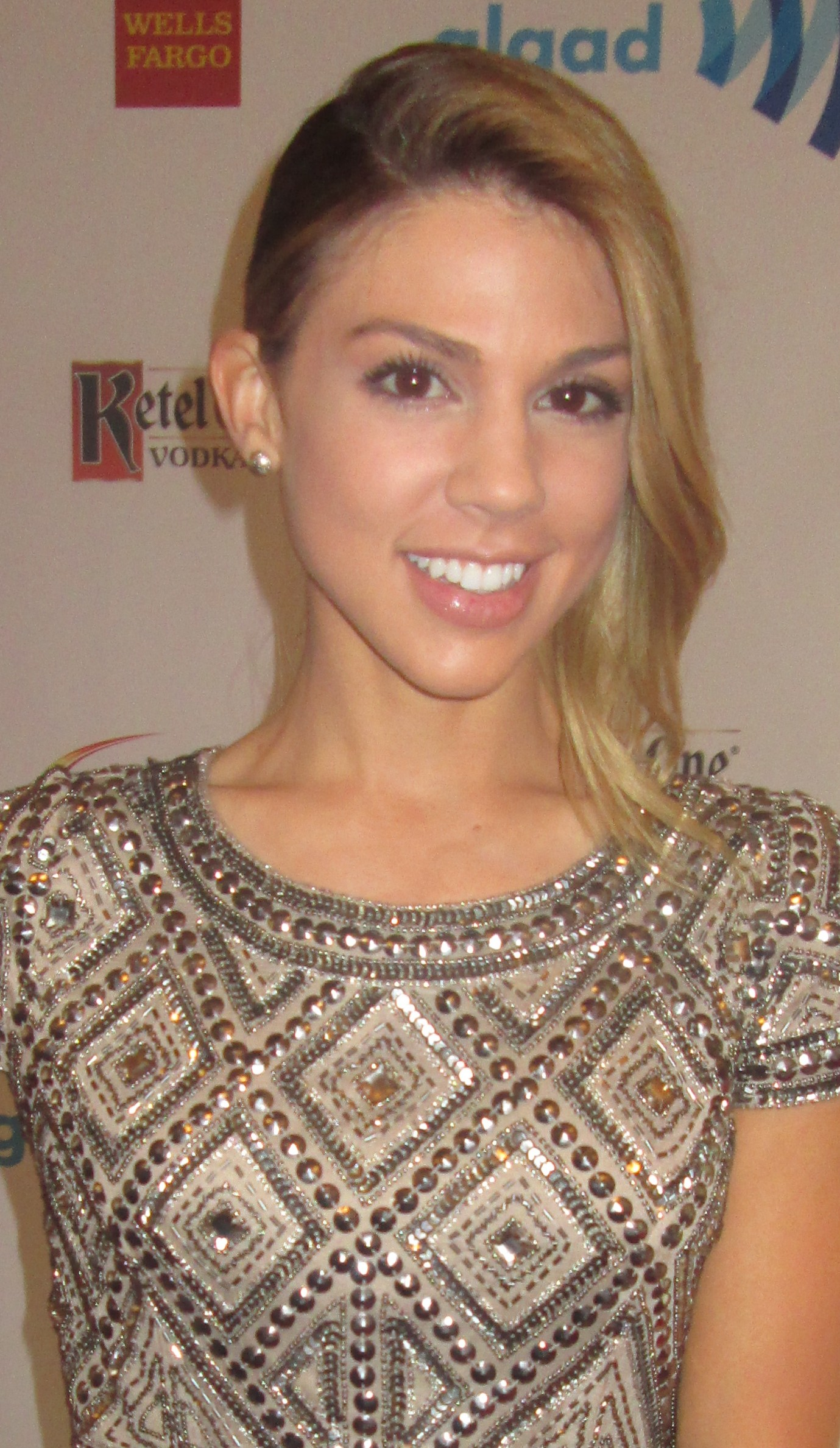
Kate Mansi, Outstanding Supporting Actress in a Drama Series winner

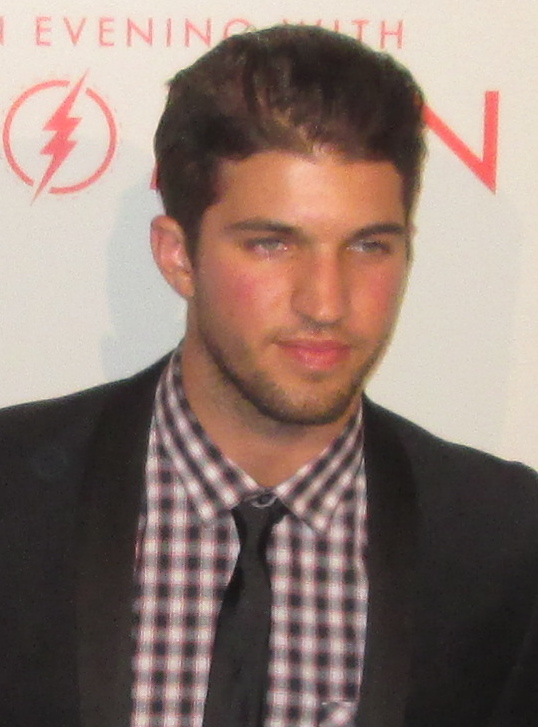
Bryan Craig, Outstanding Younger Actor in a Drama Series winner

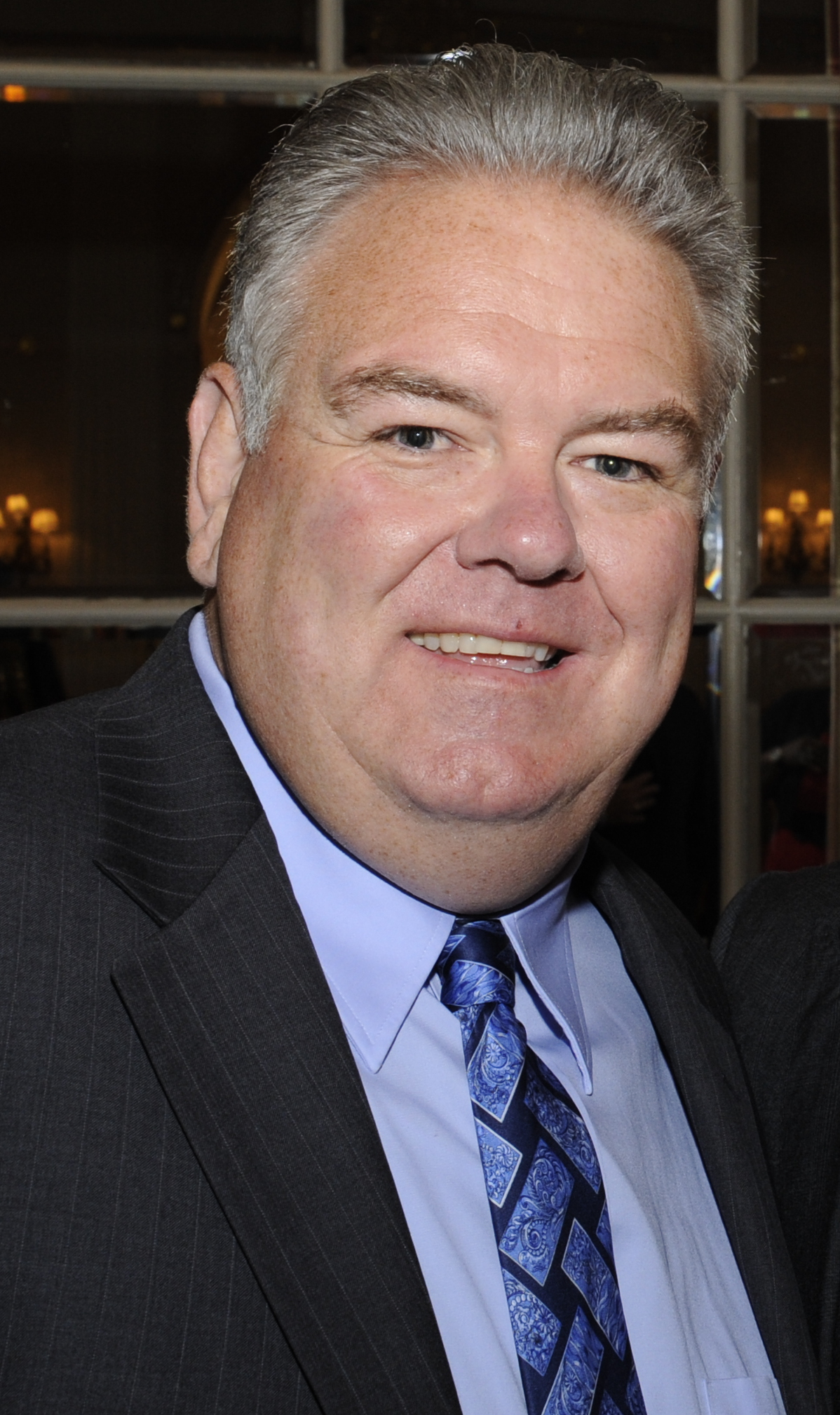
Jim O'Heir, Outstanding Guest Performer in a Drama Series winner

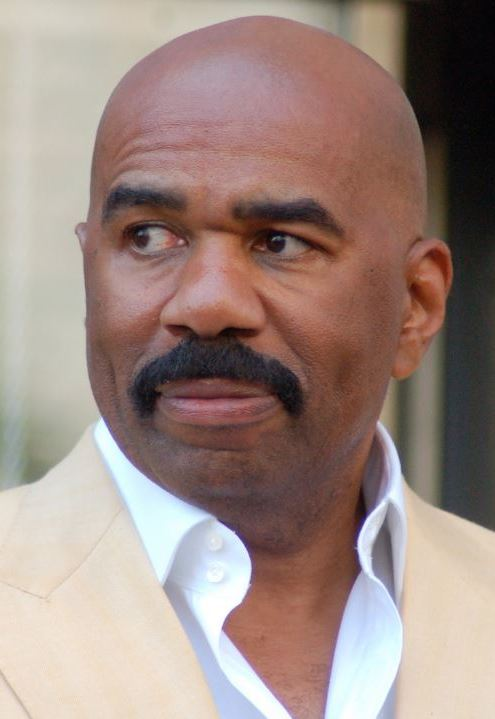
Steve Harvey, Outstanding Game Show Host & Informative Talk Show Host winner

Category	Winners and nominees
Outstanding Drama Series	**General Hospital (ABC)** ‡; The Bold and the Beautiful (CBS); Days of Our Lives (NBC); The Young and the Restless (CBS)
Outstanding Game Show	**Jeopardy! (Syndicated)** ‡; Celebrity Name Game (Syndicated); Family Feud (Syndicated); Let's Make a Deal (CBS); The Price Is Right (CBS)
Outstanding Morning Program	**Good Morning America (ABC)** ‡; CBS Sunday Morning (CBS); CBS This Morning (CBS); The Today Show (NBC)
Outstanding Talk Show/Informative	**The Dr. Oz Show (Syndicated)** ‡; Steve Harvey (Syndicated); The Chew (ABC); The Kitchen (Food Network); Larry King Now (Ora TV)
Outstanding Talk Show/Entertainment	**The Ellen DeGeneres Show (Syndicated)** ‡; Live! with Kelly (Syndicated); Maury (Syndicated); The Talk (CBS); The View (ABC)
Outstanding Entertainment News Program	**Entertainment Tonight (CBS)** ‡; Access Hollywood (NBC); E! News (E!); Extra (Syndicated); Inside Edition (Syndicated)
Outstanding Entertainment Program in Spanish	**Destinos (CNN en Español)** ‡; El Gordo y la Flaca (Univision); LAnzate (Univision); SuperLatina with Gaby Natale (V-me); Jackeline Cacho Presenta Triunfo Latino (V-me)
Outstanding Lead Actress in a Drama Series	**Gina Tognoni as Phyllis Summers on The Young and the Restless (CBS)** ‡; Nancy Lee Grahn as Alexis Davis on General Hospital (ABC); Heather Tom as Katie Logan on The Bold and the Beautiful (CBS); Jess Walton as Jill Abbott on The Young and the Restless (CBS); Laura Wright as Carly Corinthos on General Hospital (ABC)
Outstanding Lead Actor in a Drama Series	**Scott Clifton as Liam Spencer on The Bold and the Beautiful (CBS)** ‡; Peter Bergman as Jack Abbott on The Young and the Restless (CBS); Billy Flynn as Chad DiMera on Days of Our Lives (NBC); Vincent Irizarry as Deimos Kiriakis on Days of Our Lives (NBC); Kristoff St. John as Neil Winters on The Young and the Restless (CBS)
Outstanding Supporting Actress in a Drama Series	**Kate Mansi as Abigail Deveraux on Days of Our Lives (NBC)** ‡; Stacy Haiduk as Patty Williams on The Young and the Restless (CBS); Anna Maria Horsford as Vivienne Avant on The Bold and the Beautiful (CBS); Finola Hughes as Anna Devane on General Hospital (ABC); Kelly Sullivan as Sage Newman on The Young and the Restless (CBS)
Outstanding Supporting Actor in a Drama Series	**Steve Burton as Dylan McAvoy on The Young and the Restless (CBS)** ‡; John Aniston as Victor Kiriakis on Days of Our Lives (NBC); Chad Duell as Michael Corinthos on General Hospital (ABC); Jeffrey Vincent Parise as Carlos Rivera / Joe Rivera on General Hospital (ABC); James Reynolds as Abe Carver on Days of Our Lives (NBC)
Outstanding Younger Actress in a Drama Series	**Lexi Ainsworth as Kristina Corinthos Davis on General Hospital (ABC)** ‡; Reign Edwards as Nicole Avant on The Bold and the Beautiful (CBS); Hunter King as Summer Newman on The Young and the Restless (CBS); Chloe Lanier as Nelle Hayes on General Hospital (ABC); Alyvia Alyn Lind as Faith Newman on The Young and the Restless (CBS)
Outstanding Younger Actor in a Drama Series	**Bryan Craig as Morgan Corinthos on General Hospital (ABC)** ‡; Pierson Fodé as Thomas Forrester on The Bold and the Beautiful (CBS); James Lastovic as Joey Johnson on Days of Our Lives (NBC); Tequan Richmond as TJ Ashford on General Hospital (ABC); Anthony Turpel as R.J. Forrester on The Bold and the Beautiful (CBS)
Outstanding Special Guest Performer in a Drama Series	**Jim O'Heir as Matt Cannistra on The Bold and the Beautiful (CBS)** ‡; Tobin Bell as Yo Ling on Days of Our Lives (NBC); Don Harvey as Tom Baker on General Hospital (ABC); Monica Horan as Kieran Cannistra on The Bold and the Beautiful (CBS); Nichelle Nichols as Lucinda Winters on The Young and the Restless (CBS)
Outstanding Daytime Talent in a Spanish Language Program	**Gaby Natale – SuperLatina with Gaby Natale (VmeTV)** ‡; Bárbara Bermudo – Primer Impacto (Univision); Jackeline Cacho – Jackeline Cacho Presenta Triunfo Latino (V-me); Tanya Charry – El Gordo y la Flaca (Univision); Camilo Egaña – Eucentro (CNN en Español)
Outstanding Game Show Host	**Steve Harvey – Family Feud (Syndicated)** ‡; Wayne Brady – Let's Make a Deal (CBS); Craig Ferguson – Celebrity Name Game (Syndicated); Pat Sajak – Wheel of Fortune (Syndicated); Alex Trebek – Jeopardy! (Syndicated)
Outstanding Informative Talk Show Host	**Steve Harvey – Steve Harvey (Syndicated)** ‡; Mario Batali, Carla Hall, Clinton Kelly, Daphne Oz and Michael Symon – The Chew (ABC); Dr. Mehmet Oz – The Dr. Oz Show (Syndicated); Sunny Anderson, Katie Lee, Jeff Mauro, Marcela Valladolid and Geoffrey Zakarian – The Kitchen (Food Network); Larry King – Larry King Now (Ora TV); Chris Hedges – On Contact (RT America)
Outstanding Entertainment Talk Show Host	**Julie Chen, Sara Gilbert, Sharon Osbourne, Aisha Tyler, and Sheryl Underwood – The Talk (CBS)** ‡; Harry Connick Jr. – Harry (Syndicated); Kelly Ripa – Live! with Kelly (Syndicated); Tamar Braxton, Adrienne Houghton, Loni Love, Jeannie Mai, and Tamera Mowry-Housley – The Real (Syndicated); Joy Behar, Jedediah Bila, Candace Cameron Bure, Paula Faris, Whoopi Goldberg, Sara Haines, Sunny Hostin, and Raven-Symoné – The View (ABC); Wendy Williams – The Wendy Williams Show (Syndicated)
Outstanding Drama Series Writing Team	**The Young and the Restless (CBS)** ‡; The Bold and the Beautiful (CBS); Days of Our Lives (NBC); General Hospital (ABC)
Outstanding Drama Series Directing Team	**General Hospital (ABC)** ‡; The Bold and the Beautiful (CBS); Days of Our Lives (NBC); The Young and the Restless (CBS)

=== Lifetime Achievement Award ===
- Mary Hart, former long-running host of Entertainment Tonight

== Presenters and performances ==
The following individuals presented awards or performed musical acts.

=== Presenters (in order of appearance) ===
Name(s)	Role
Christian Lanz	Announcer for the 44th Annual Daytime Emmy Awards
Adrienne Houghton; Loni Love; Jeannie Mai; Tamera Mowry-Housley	Presenters of the award for Outstanding Supporting Actor in a Drama Series
Dr. Mehmet Oz	Presenter of the award for Outstanding Morning Program
Kelly Monaco; Donnell Turner	Presenters of the award for Outstanding Younger Actress in a Drama Series
Margaret Cho; Ross Matthews	Presenters of the award for Outstanding Game Show
Natalie Morales	Special tribute of the 65th Anniversary of Today
Larry King; Garcelle Beauvais	Presenters of the award for Outstanding Guest Performer in a Drama Series
Mark Steines; Debbie Matenopoulos	Presenters of the award for Outstanding Daytime Talent in a Spanish Language Program
Chris Hansen; Erika Jayne	Presenters of the award for Outstanding Drama Series Directing Team
Susan Lucci	Special tribute to Agnes Nixon
Carla Hall; Daphne Oz	Presenters of the award for Outstanding Supporting Actress in a Drama Series
Brandon McMillan	Presenter of the award for Outstanding Younger Actor in a Drama Series
Harry Connick Jr.	Presenter of the award for Outstanding Informative Talk Show Host
Tim Allen	Presenter of the Lifetime Achievement Award
Sara Gilbert; Sharon Osbourne; Aisha Tyler; Sheryl Underwood	Presenters of the award for Outstanding Talk Show/Informative
Trisha Yearwood	Presenter of the award for Outstanding Talk Show/Entertainment
Vanna White	Presenter of the award for Outstanding Drama Series Writing Team
Kevin Frazier; Nancy O'Dell	Presenters of the award for Outstanding Game Show Host
Jeffrey Vincent Parise; Stephanie Reichert	Presenters of the award for Entertainment Program in Spanish
Katherine Kelly Lang; John McCook	Special tribute of the 30th Anniversary of The Bold and the Beautiful
Bryton James; Mishael Morgan	Presenters of the award for Outstanding Culinary Program
Tarek El Moussa; Christina El Moussa	Presenters of the award for Outstanding Entertainment News Program
Alex Trebek	Presenter of the In Memoriam tribute
Chuck Dages (NATAS Chairman)	Special presentation highlighting the benefits of daytime television and diversity
Billy Flynn; Marci Miller	Presenters of the award for Outstanding Entertainment Talk Show Host
Sherri Shepherd; Blair Underwood	Presenters of the award for Outstanding Lead Actress in a Drama Series
Jane Pauley	Presenter of the award for Outstanding Lead Actor in a Drama Series
Gladys Knight	Presenter of the award for Outstanding Drama Series

=== Performers ===
Name(s)	Role	Performed
Caleb Martin and The Remotes	Music Director	Band
Nadia Bjorlin; Reign Edwards; Tristan Lake Leabu; Eric Martsolf; Karla Mosley; Robert Palmer Watkins; Jacob Young; Crenshaw High School Choir	Performers	"Seasons of Love"
Max Ehrich	Performer	"Hallelujah" during the annual In Memoriam tribute
