= My Dad, John McCain =

Book by Meghan McCain

- Author: Meghan McCain
- Illustrator: Dan Andreasen
- Cover artist: Andreasen
- Language: English
- Genre: Children's literature, picture book, biography
- Publisher: Aladdin Books
- Publication date: 2008
- Publication place: United States of America
- Media type: Print (Hardcover)
- Pages: 32
- ISBN: 1-4169-7528-4
- OCLC: 230206464
- Dewey Decimal: 328.73092 B 22
- LC Class: E840.8.M26 M38 2008

My Dad, John McCain is an illustrated children's picture book based on the life of politician John McCain, written by his daughter, Meghan McCain, and published through Aladdin Paperbacks. It was released on September 2, 2008. The book's images were illustrated by Dan Andreasen. The book was intended to support John McCain's candidacy for President of the United States in 2008.

== Book ==
Eight years later, he decided to run for president again. Things didn’t look great at first. His campaign nearly ran out of money. People were starting to say he didn't have a chance. But my dad never gives up.

— Meghan McCain in My Dad, John McCain

The book focuses on John McCain's military service and his presidential run. Although the book is aimed at children, it deals with John McCain's capture and imprisonment as a prisoner of war for five and a half years during the Vietnam War, and even depicts violent scenes of John McCain being poked with hot iron prods as well as a man being stabbed repeatedly with a small knife by a Viet Cong insurgent. For its initial pressing, over 200,000 copies were printed. The book has been described as "less a children's book than one written for wide-eyed adults with very nice drawings."
