= 49th Daytime Emmy Awards =

- Date: June 24, 2022
- Location: Pasadena Convention Center; Pasadena, California, U.S.
- Presented by: National Academy of Television Arts and Sciences
- Hosted by: Kevin Frazier; Nischelle Turner

Highlights
- Most awards: General Hospital (5)
- Outstanding Drama Series: General Hospital
- Outstanding Game Show: Jeopardy!

Television/radio coverage
- Network: CBS; Paramount+
- Viewership: 2.945 million

The 49th Daytime Emmy Awards, presented by the National Academy of Television Arts and Sciences (NATAS), honored the best in U.S. daytime television programming in 2021. The award ceremony was held live on June 24, 2022, at the Pasadena Convention Center in Pasadena, California. The ceremony was broadcast in the U.S. on CBS and streamed on Paramount+. Nominations were announced on Thursday, May 5, 2022.

Kevin Frazier and Nischelle Turner, co-anchors of the syndicated entertainment newsmagazine Entertainment Tonight, hosted the ceremony for the first time.

In response to the growth of streaming television, this was the first year under a major realignment of the Daytime and Primetime Emmy Awards, where the two ceremonies' scopes now revolve more around factors such as the themes, format, and style characteristics, instead of strictly dayparts.

== Ceremony information ==
=== Emmys realignment ===
In December 2021, the Academy of Television Arts & Sciences (ATAS) and the National Academy of Television Arts and Sciences (NATAS) announced a major realignment of the Emmy Award ceremonies. This was in response to the growth of streaming television, which blurred the lines in determining which shows should fall under the Daytime or Primetime Emmys. The two ceremonies' scopes will now revolve around factors such as the themes and frequency of such programming, rather than strictly dayparts.

Among the major changes that will take effect at the 49th Daytime Emmy Awards in June 2022 and at the 74th Primetime Emmy Awards in September 2022:

- Daytime dramas, as defined as "any multi-camera, weekday daily serial, spin-off or reboot", remain at the Daytime Emmys but most other scripted dramas and comedies will have to enter into the Primetime Emmys. For example, the streaming limited series Days of Our Lives: Beyond Salem may still enter into the Daytime Emmys because it is a spin-off of the daytime soap opera Days of Our Lives, but a previous Daytime Emmy winner like The Bay would have to move to the Primetime Emmys.
- Talk shows will now be divided between the Daytime and Primetime Emmys based on "format and style characteristics reflective of current programming in the daytime or late night space". Such programs may petition to switch ceremonies, such as the previous Daytime Emmy winner The Ellen DeGeneres Show, whose format is more similar to the late night talk shows awarded at the Primetime Emmys.
- All children's programming categories have been moved to the new Children's & Family Emmy Awards.
- Categories for morning shows have been moved from the Daytime Emmys to the News & Documentary Emmy Awards. Such programs may instead enter into the Daytime Emmys' talk show categories depending on their format.

Categories for game shows and instructional programming will remain split this year between the Daytime and Primetime Emmys, with their realignment to be determined in 2023.

=== Other rule changes ===
The maximum age limit for those eligible for Outstanding Younger Performer in a Drama Series has been lowered from 25 to 21 (it was further lowered to 18 in 2023).

== Winners and nominees ==
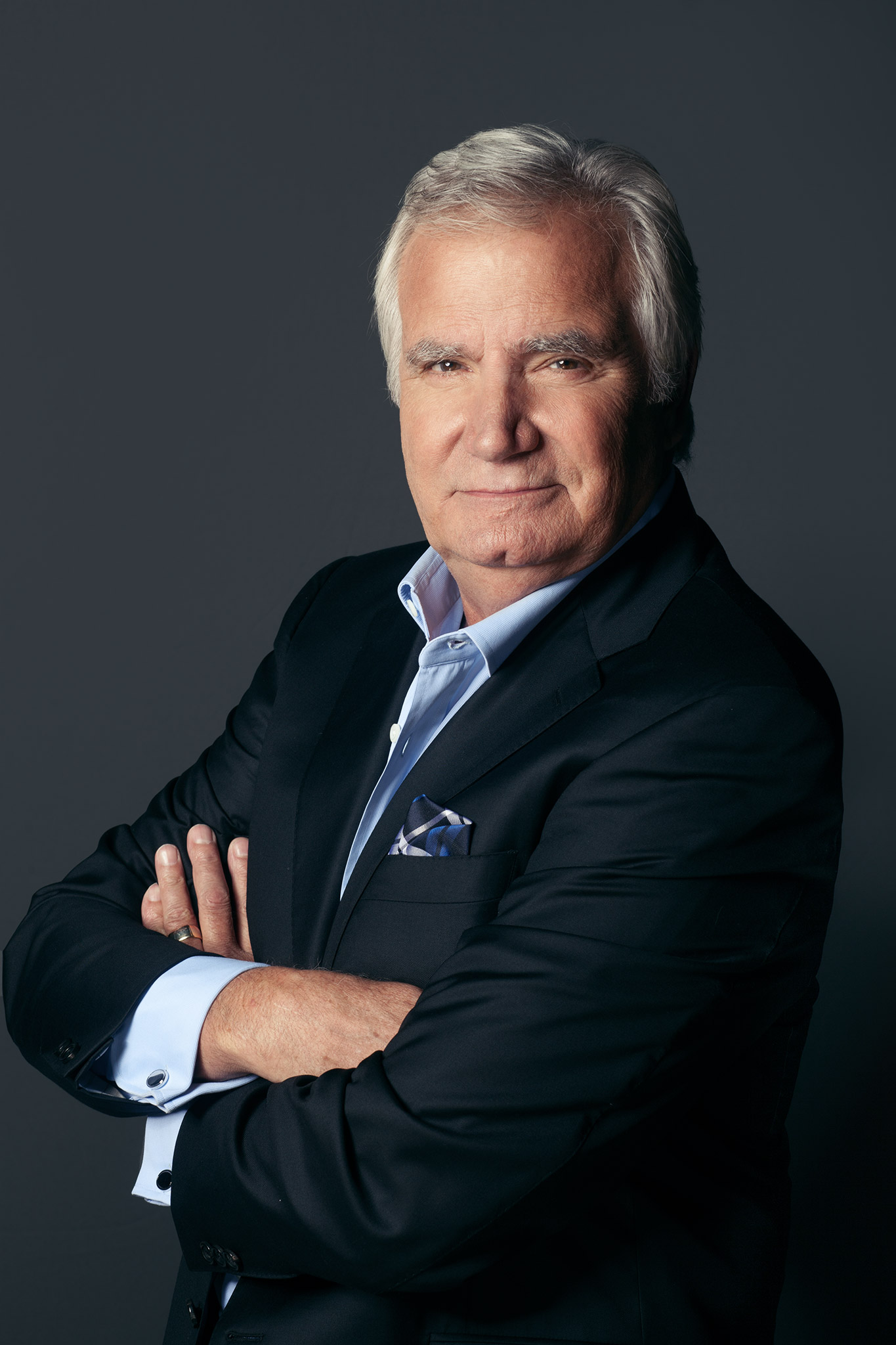
John McCook, Outstanding Performance by a Lead Actor in a Drama Series winner

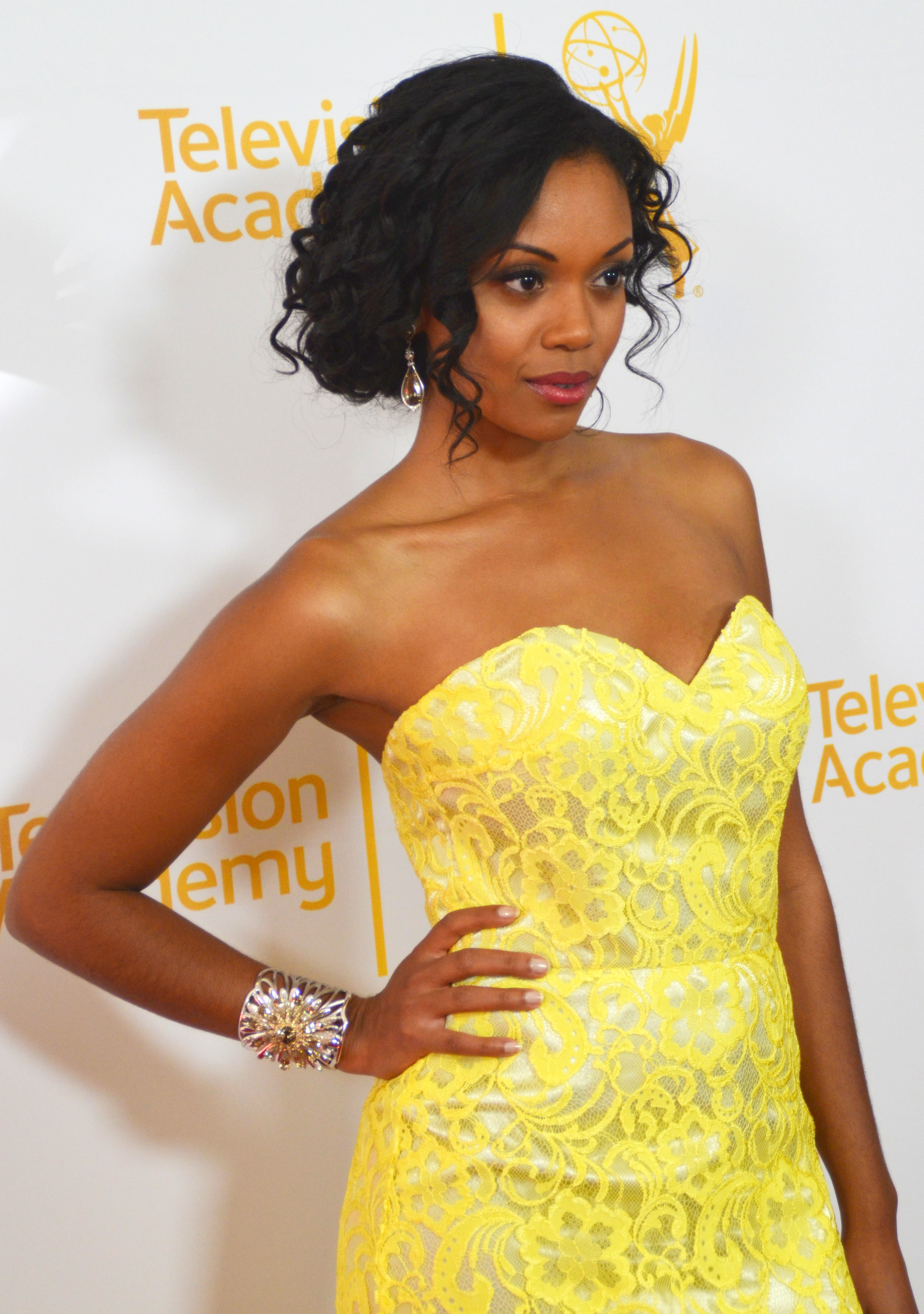
Mishael Morgan, Outstanding Performance by a Lead Actress in a Drama Series winner

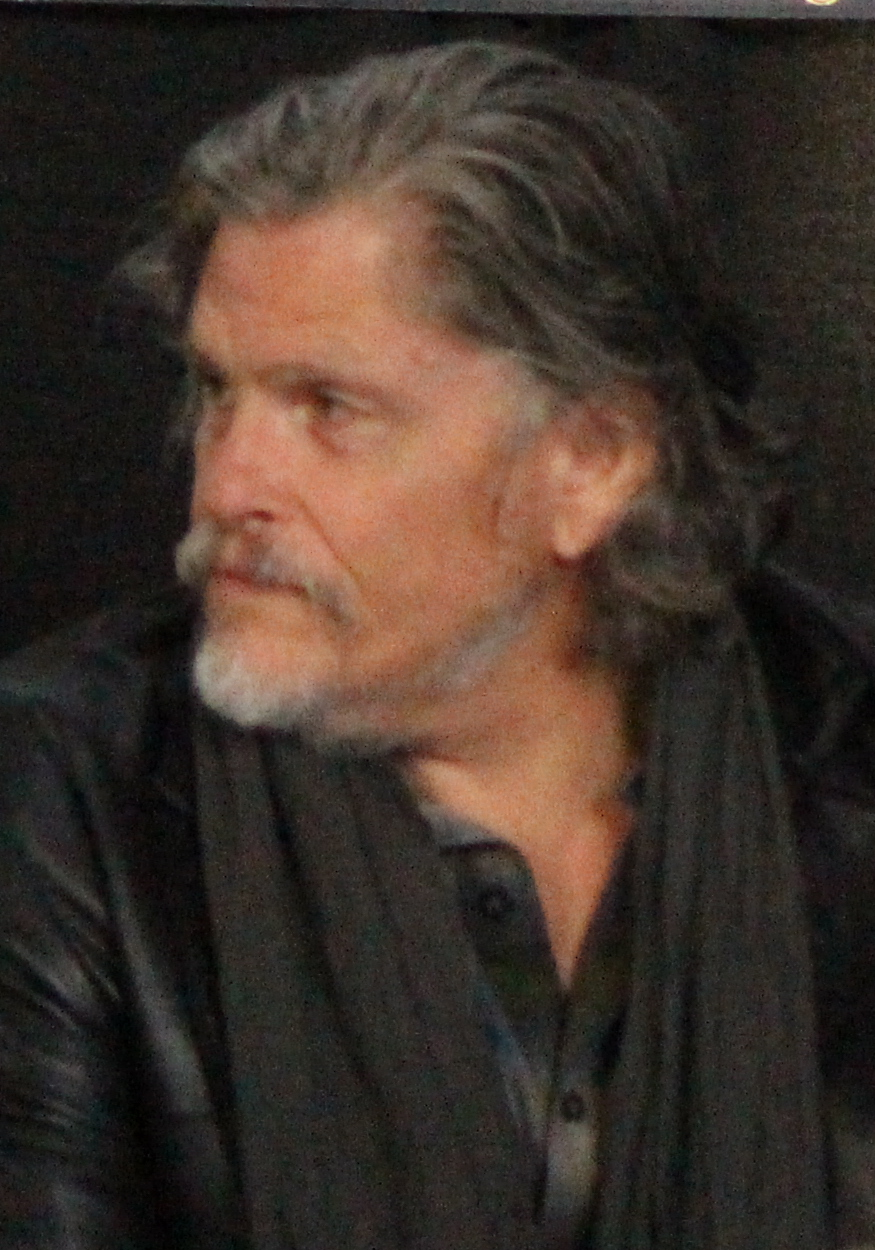
Jeff Kober, Outstanding Performance by a Supporting Actor in a Drama Series winner

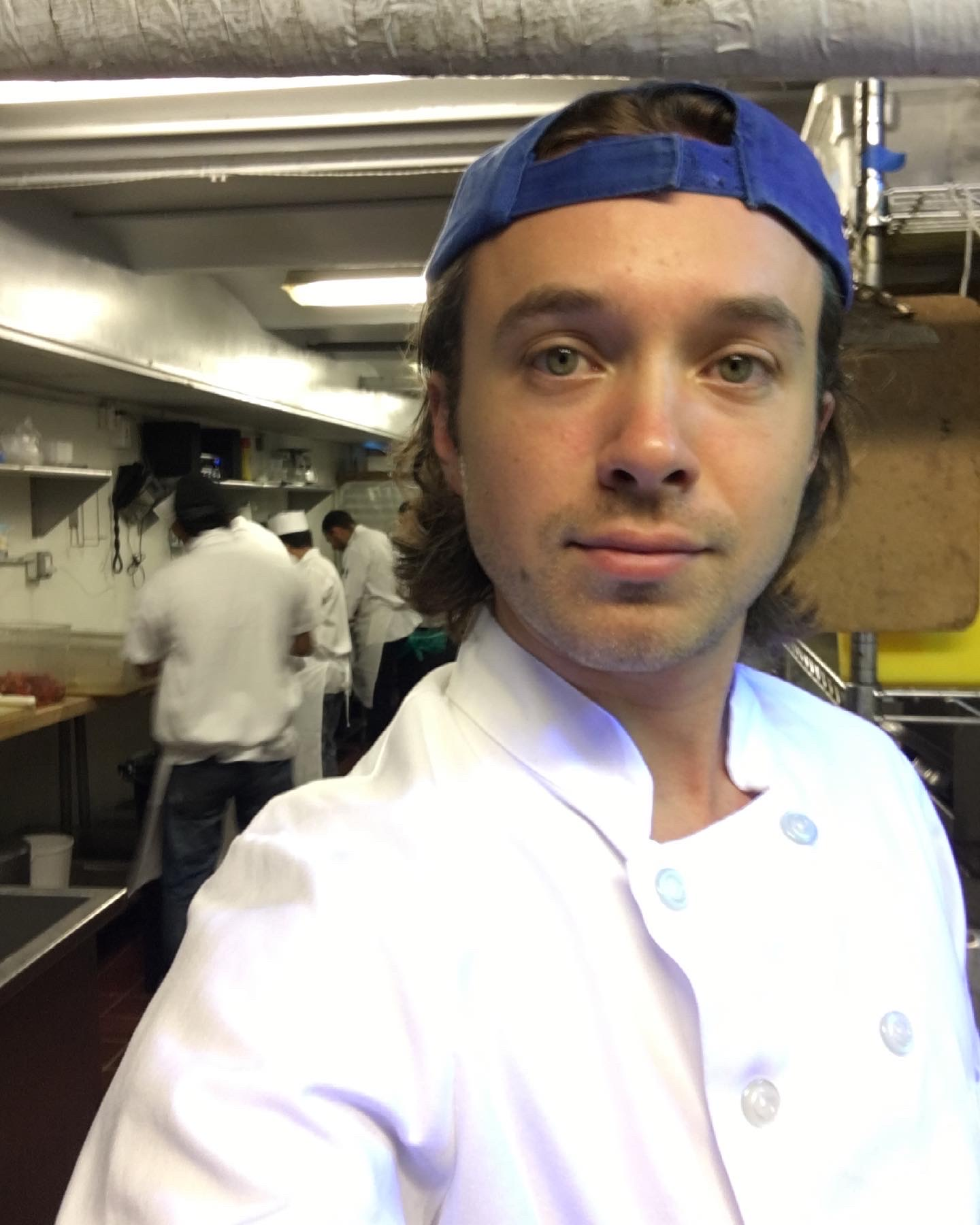
Frankie Celenza, Outstanding Culinary Show Host winner

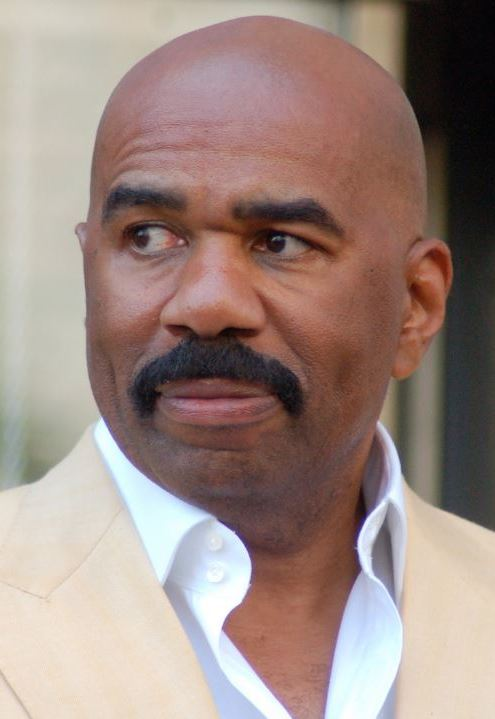
Steve Harvey, Outstanding Game Show Host winner

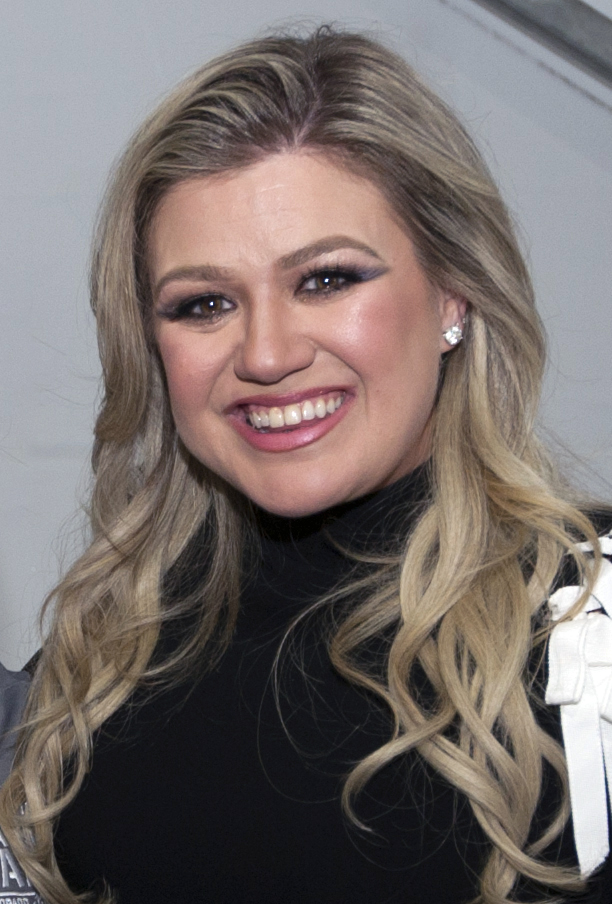
Kelly Clarkson, Outstanding Entertainment Talk Show Host winner

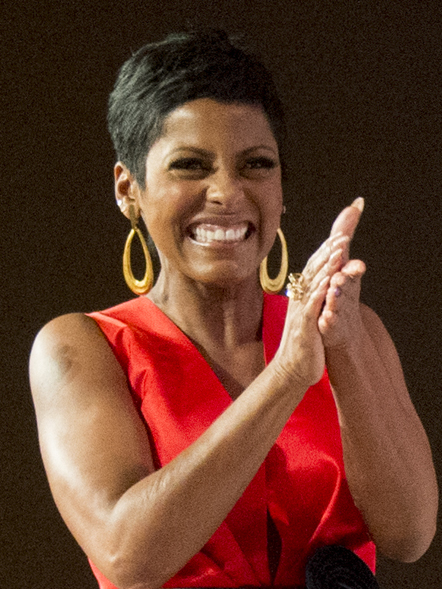
Tamron Hall, Outstanding Informative Talk Show Host winner

The nominations for both the 49th Daytime Emmy Awards and the Creative Arts & Lifestyle Daytime Emmy Awards were announced on May 5, 2022. Winners in each category are listed first, in boldface.

=== Programming ===
Programming
**Outstanding Drama Series**: **General Hospital (ABC)**; Beyond Salem (Peacock); The Bold and the Beautiful (CBS); Days of Our Lives (NBC); The Young and the Restless (CBS)	**Outstanding Entertainment Talk Show**: **The Kelly Clarkson Show (Syndicated)**; The Drew Barrymore Show (Syndicated); Hot Ones (YouTube); Live with Kelly and Ryan (Syndicated); Today with Hoda & Jenna (NBC)
**Outstanding Game Show**: **Jeopardy! (Syndicated)**; Family Feud (Syndicated); Let's Make a Deal (CBS); The Price Is Right (CBS); Wheel of Fortune (Syndicated)	**Outstanding Legal/Courtroom Program**: **Judy Justice (IMDbTV)**; Caught in Providence (Facebook Watch); Judge Mathis (Syndicated); The People's Court (Syndicated)
**Outstanding Informative Talk Show**: **Turning the Tables with Robin Roberts (Disney+)**; GMA3: What You Need To Know (ABC); Peace of Mind with Taraji (Facebook Watch); Red Table Talk (Facebook Watch); Red Table Talk: The Estefans (Facebook Watch); Tamron Hall (Syndicated)	**Outstanding Entertainment News Series**: **Entertainment Tonight (Syndicated)**; Access Hollywood (Syndicated); Extra (Syndicated); Inside Edition (Syndicated)

=== Acting ===
Acting
**Outstanding Performance by a Lead Actor in a Drama Series**: **John McCook as Eric Forrester on The Bold and the Beautiful (CBS)**; Peter Bergman as Jack Abbott on The Young and the Restless (CBS); Eric Martsolf as Brady Black on Days of Our Lives (NBC); James Reynolds as Abe Carver on Days of Our Lives (NBC); Jason Thompson as Billy Abbott on The Young and the Restless (CBS)	**Outstanding Performance by a Lead Actress in a Drama Series**: **Mishael Morgan as Amanda Sinclair on The Young and the Restless (CBS)**; Marci Miller as Abigail DiMera on Days of Our Lives (NBC); Cynthia Watros as Nina Reeves on General Hospital (ABC); Laura Wright as Carly Corinthos on General Hospital (ABC); Arianne Zucker as Nicole Walker on Days of Our Lives (NBC)
**Outstanding Performance by a Supporting Actor in a Drama Series**: **Jeff Kober as Cyrus Renault on General Hospital (ABC)**; Bryton James as Devon Hamilton on The Young and the Restless (CBS); Aaron D. Spears as Justin Barber on The Bold and the Beautiful (CBS); James Patrick Stuart as Valentin Cassadine on General Hospital (ABC); Jordi Vilasuso as Rey Rosales on The Young and the Restless (CBS)	**Outstanding Performance by a Supporting Actress in a Drama Series**: **Kelly Thiebaud as Dr. Britt Westbourne on General Hospital (ABC)**; Kimberlin Brown as Sheila Carter on The Bold and the Beautiful (CBS); Nancy Lee Grahn as Alexis Davis on General Hospital (ABC); Stacy Haiduk as Kristen DiMera on Days of Our Lives (NBC); Melissa Ordway as Abby Newman on The Young and the Restless (CBS)
**Outstanding Younger Performer in a Drama Series**: **Nicholas Chavez as Spencer Cassadine on General Hospital (ABC)**; Lindsay Arnold as Allie Horton on Days of Our Lives (NBC); Alyvia Alyn Lind as Faith Newman on The Young and the Restless (CBS); William Lipton as Cameron Webber on General Hospital (ABC); Sydney Mikayla as Trina Robinson on General Hospital (ABC)	**Outstanding Guest Performer in a Drama Series**: **Ted King as Jack Finnegan on The Bold and the Beautiful (CBS)**; Robert Gossett as Marshall Ashford on General Hospital (ABC); Michael Lowry as Dr. Clay Snyder on Days of Our Lives (NBC); Naomi Matsuda as Dr. Li Finnegan on The Bold and the Beautiful (CBS); Ptosha Storey as Naya Benedict on The Young and the Restless (CBS)

=== Hosting ===
Hosting
**Outstanding Culinary Show Host**: **Frankie Celenza – Struggle Meals (Tastemade)**; Lidia Bastianich – Lidia's Kitchen (PBS); Daym Drops – Fresh, Fried & Crispy (Netflix); Ina Garten – Barefoot Contessa: Modern Comfort Food (Food Network); Christopher Kimball – Milk Street (PBS)	**Outstanding Game Show Host**: **Steve Harvey – Family Feud (Syndicated)**; Wayne Brady – Let's Make a Deal (CBS); Leah Remini – People Puzzler (Game Show Network); Pat Sajak – Celebrity Wheel of Fortune (ABC); Pat Sajak – Wheel of Fortune (Syndicated)
**Outstanding Entertainment Talk Show Host**: **Kelly Clarkson – The Kelly Clarkson Show (Syndicated)**; Drew Barrymore – The Drew Barrymore Show (Syndicated); Hoda Kotb and Jenna Bush Hager – Today with Hoda & Jenna (NBC); Kelly Ripa and Ryan Seacrest – Live! with Kelly and Ryan (Syndicated)	**Outstanding Informative Talk Show Host**: **Tamron Hall – Tamron Hall (Syndicated)**; Gloria Estefan, Emily Estefan and Lili Estefan – Red Table Talk: The Estefans (Facebook Watch); Whoopi Goldberg, Joy Behar, Sunny Hostin, Sara Haines, Ana Navarro, Meghan McCain – The View (ABC); Taraji P. Henson & Tracie Jade – Peace of Mind with Taraji (Facebook Watch); Robin Roberts – Turning the Tables with Robin Roberts (Disney+)

=== Directing/Writing ===
Directing/Writing
**Outstanding Directing Team for a Drama Series**: General Hospital (ABC): Directors: Frank Valentini; William Ludel; Gary Tomlin; Phideaux Xavier; Denise Van Cleave; Tina Keller; Robert Markham; Allison Reames Smith; Associate directors: Teresa Cicala; Christine Magarian Ucar; Marika Kushel; Jillian Dedote; Peter Fillmore; Paul Glass; Dave MacLeod; Stage managers: Craig McManus; Kyle Bell; Production associates: Nate Hapke; Kelli Kuschman; Beyond Salem (Peacock): Directors: Albert Alarr; Scott McKinsey; Noel Maxam; Sonia Blangiardo-Goins; Associate directors: Joseph Lumer; Michael Fiamingo; Lugh Powers; Jenee Muyeau; Kevin Church; Stage managers: Lucy Yalenian; Jessie Harrison; Production associates: Sara Peterson-McCormick; Holly Metts; Alexis Straiten; Days of Our Lives (NBC): Directors: Albert Alarr; Scott McKinsey; Noel Maxam; Sonia Blangiardo-Goins; Associate directors: Joseph Lumer; Michael Fiamingo; Lugh Powers; Jenee Muyeau; Kevin Church; Stage managers: Lucy Yalenian; Jessie Harrison; Production associates: Sara Peterson-McCormick; Holly Metts; Alexis Straiten; The Young and the Restless (CBS): Directors: Michael Eilbaum; Sally McDonald; Owen Renfroe; Steven Williford; Associate directors: Derek Berlatsky; Andrew Hachem; Robbin Phillips; Stage managers: Fritz Brekeller; Brendan Higgins; Production associates: Kristin Doherty; Alexandra Jensen; Nancy Ortenberg	**Outstanding Writing Team for a Drama Series**: Days of Our Lives (NBC): Head writer: Ron Carlivati; Associate writer: Ryan Quan; Writer: Fran Myers; Breakdown writers: Lorraine Broderick; Jeanne Marie Ford; Jamey Giddens; Dave Ryan; Katherine Schock; Elizabeth Snyder; Script writers: Joanna Cohen; Carolyn Culliton; Richard Culliton; David Kreizman; Rebecca McCarty; Beyond Salem (Peacock): Head writer: Ron Carlivati; Associate writer: Ryan Quan; Writer:Fran Myers; Breakdown writers: Lorraine Broderick; Jeanne Marie Ford; Jamey Giddens; Dave Ryan; Katherine Schock; Script writers: Joanna Cohen; Carolyn Culliton; Richard Culliton; David Kreizman; Rebecca McCarty; General Hospital (ABC): Head writers: Chris Van Etten; Dan O'Connor; Associate head writer: Anna Theresa Cascio; Writers: Barbara Bloom; Suzanne Flynn; Charlotte Gibson; Lucky Gold; Kate Hall; Elizabeth Korte; Shannon Peace; Dave Rupel; Lisa Seidman; Scott Sickles; The Young and the Restless (CBS): Head writer: Josh Griffith; Associate head writer: Amanda L. Beall; Writers: Susan Banks; Jeff Beldner; Sara Bibel; Brent Boyd; Michael Conforti; Susan Dansby; Christopher Dunn; Sara Endsley; Janice Ferri Esser; Marin Gazzaniga; Lynn Martin; Natalie Minardi Slater; Teresa Zimmerman

== Lifetime Achievement Award ==
- John Aniston, long-running actor on Days of Our Lives who has played Victor Kiriakis since 1985.

== Multiple wins ==
Shows with multiple major wins
Wins	Show	Network
5	General Hospital	ABC
2	The Kelly Clarkson Show	Syndicated
2	The Bold and the Beautiful	CBS

== Presenters and performances ==
The following individuals presented awards or performed musical acts.

=== Presenters (in order of appearance) ===
Name	Role
Sylvia Villagran	Announcer for the 49th Annual Daytime Emmy Awards
Tanner Novlan; Krista Allen	Presenters of the award for Outstanding Supporting Actress in a Drama Series
Galen Gering; Camila Banus	Presenters of the award for Outstanding Supporting Actor in a Drama Series
Drew Carey	Presenter of the special tribute to the 50th Anniversary of The Price Is Right
James Reynolds	Presenter of Beyond Salem on the Outstanding Daytime Drama Series segment
Kevin Frazier; Nischelle Turner	Presenters of the award for Outstanding Informative Talk Show and Outstanding Informative Talk Show Host
Lawrence Saint-Victor	Presenter of The Bold and the Beautiful on the Outstanding Daytime Drama Series segment
Jerry O'Connell; Natalie Morales	Presenter of the award for Outstanding Directing Team for a Drama Series
Susan Lucci	Presenter of the In Memoriam tribute
Kevin Frazier; Nischelle Turner	Presenter of the special tribute to the conclusion of The Ellen DeGeneres Show and Maury
Scott Evans	Presenter of the award for Outstanding Entertainment Talk Show and Outstanding Entertainment Talk Show Host
Suzanne Rogers; Jennifer Aniston	Presenters of the Lifetime Achievement Award to John Aniston
Deidre Hall	Presenter of Days of Our Lives on the Outstanding Daytime Drama Series segment
Deborah Norville	Presenter of the award for Outstanding Younger Performer in a Drama Series
Tamron Hall	Presenter of the award for Outstanding Entertainment News Series
Laura Wright	Presenter of General Hospital on the Outstanding Daytime Drama Series segment
Terry O'Reilly (NATAS Chairman)	Special presentation highlighting the benefits of daytime television and diversity
Ted King	Presenter of the award for Outstanding Writing Team for a Drama Series
Tracey E. Bregman	Presenter of The Young and the Restless on the Outstanding Daytime Drama Series segment
Kevin Frazier; Nischelle Turner	Presenters of the award for Outstanding Game Show and Outstanding Game Show Host
Tanisha Harper; Cameron Mathison	Presenters of the award for Outstanding Lead Actor in a Drama Series
Sean Dominic; Christian LeBlanc	Presenters of the award for Outstanding Lead Actress in a Drama Series
Kevin Frazier; Nischelle Turner	Introducers of Michael Bolton
Drew Barrymore	Presenter of the award for Outstanding Daytime Drama Series

=== Performers ===
Name(s)	Role	Performed
Michael Bolton	Performer	"How Am I Supposed to Live Without You" during the annual In Memoriam tribute
Michael Bolton	Performer	"Beautiful World"
