= Jedediah Bila =

American television host

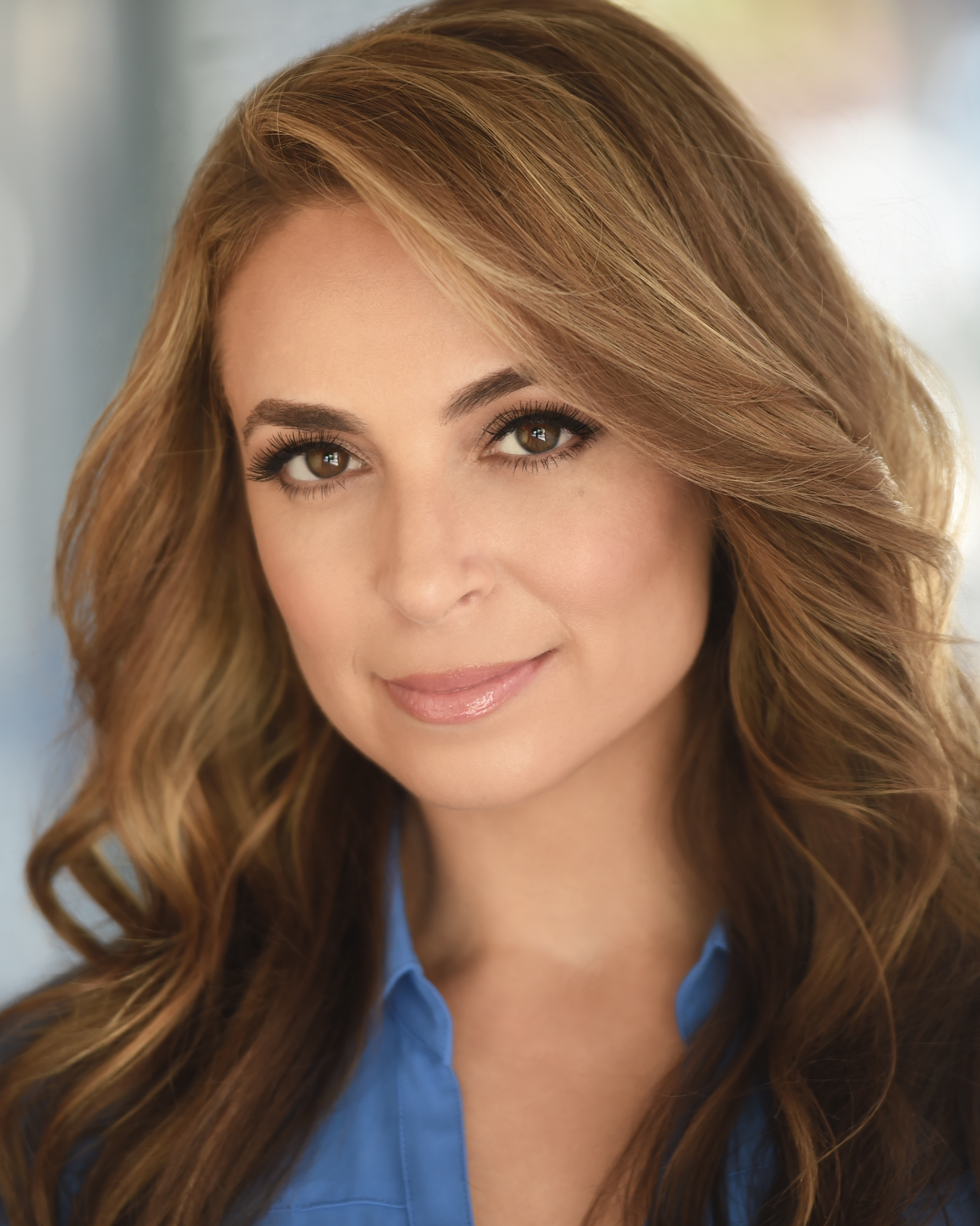
- Bila in 2016
- Born: Jedediah Louisa Bila; January 29, 1979 (age 47); New York City, New York, U.S.
- Education: Wagner College (BA); Columbia University (MA)
- Occupations: Television host, podcaster, author
- Spouse: Jeremy Scher (m. 2018)
- Children: 1
- Website: Official website

Jedediah Louisa Bila (born January 29, 1979) is an American podcast host and former television host. She is known for her time as a co-host on the daytime talk show The View from 2016 to 2017 and as an anchor on the weekend edition of the morning news and talk program Fox & Friends from 2019 to 2021. She has also written two books. She now hosts her own podcast.

== Life and career ==
=== Background ===
Bila was born and raised in Staten Island. She is of Italian descent. She is a graduate of Wagner College, and has a Master of Arts degree from Columbia University. In 2005, she began teaching in New York. She taught creative writing, Spanish, and improvisation to middle school, high school, and college students. She has also served as an academic dean at a private school in New York City.

=== Television career ===
Bila's transition from education to politics came in 2009, when she reviewed radio host Mark Levin's book Liberty and Tyranny: A Conservative Manifesto on her blog. Levin later read the review on air, prompting television host Sean Hannity to invite her on his Fox News program, Hannity. She joined Fox News as a contributor in 2013. In April 2014, she began appearing as a panelist on the daytime talk show Outnumbered. She also appeared regularly on the talk show The Five.

In August 2016, Bila departed Fox News to join the ABC daytime talk show The View as a permanent co-host during its 20th season. While on the show, she served as the conservative voice to contrast the liberal co-hosts. In 2017, she interviewed television personality Abby Lee Miller for the special Abby Tells All on Lifetime. That same year, Bila departed The View on September 18.

She rejoined Fox News as a contributor in November 2018. In April 2019, she was named a permanent co-host of the morning news and talk program Fox & Friends Weekend. Bila parted ways with Fox News in May 2021.

=== Podcast and Internet Personality ===
A year after her departure from Fox, Bila started her own podcast on Valuetainment entitled Jedediah Bila LIVE on June 8, 2022.

After hosting for a year, she took time off before returning with a “revamped” show in March 2025.

=== Books ===
Bila published her first book, Outnumbered: Chronicles of a Manhattan Conservative, in 2011. It is an autobiographical recounting of her experiences as a conservative living and teaching in Manhattan during the 2008 United States presidential election. In 2018, her second book, titled #DONOTDISTURB: How I Ghosted My Cell Phone to Take Back My Life, was published by HarperCollins.

== Personal life ==
Bila married Jeremy Scher in February 2018. They have one child together, a son.

Bila describes herself as "having libertarian political leanings".

== Awards and nominations ==
Year	Award	Category	Result	Ref.
2017	Daytime Emmy Award	Outstanding Entertainment Talk Show Host (shared with Joy Behar, Candace Cameron Bure, Paula Faris, Whoopi Goldberg, Sara Haines, Sunny Hostin, and Raven-Symoné)	Nominated	
2018	Daytime Emmy Award	Outstanding Entertainment Talk Show Host (shared with Joy Behar, Paula Faris, Whoopi Goldberg, Sara Haines, Sunny Hostin, and Meghan McCain)	Nominated	

== See also ==
- New Yorkers in journalism

Media offices
Preceded by Michelle Collins	The View co-host 2016–2017	Succeeded by Meghan McCain
