= Dirty Sexy Politics =

Book by Meghan McCain

- Authors: Meghan McCain
- Language: English
- Publisher: Hyperion
- Publication date: August 31, 2010

Dirty Sexy Politics is a 2010 political memoir written by Meghan McCain, the daughter of Republican Senator John McCain, about the 2008 United States presidential election.

== Content ==
In this political memoir, Meghan McCain, the daughter of Republican Senator John McCain and heiress to the Hensley & Co. beer distribution fortune through her maternal grandfather, Jim Hensley, recounts her experiences while campaigning for her father during the 2008 United States presidential election.

== Critical reception ==
The Huffington Post mocked the book cover, asking, "Beyond Sex With an Elephant, Meghan, What Are You Trying to Tell Me?". The American Spectator remarked that "Meghan cries a lot in this brief book." They added that it was hard to take her political ideas seriously, concluding that it would be "an effort that can only end in tears."

RedState blogger Leon Wolf criticized the book in The New Ledger (a web publication founded and edited by McCain's future husband Ben Domenech). Wolf argued it showed "her unbearable narcissism, delusions of persecution, anti-religious bigotry, and mendacity' as well as 'her manifestly below-average intelligence." They added, "that a publishing company let this authorial abortion go to print is an insult to the collective self-worth of our thinking nation." Wolf went on to say that the book "contain[ed] not one citation or reference to any factual source," adding that it was 'predictably disastrous.' They added that the book included examples of "spoiled-brattishness" and demonstrated "her sense of entitlement."

The Washington Post described it as a "youthful narrative" with a "healthy sense of humor." They went on to say that it was "as much a scathing critique of the Republican Party as it is a passionate tale of life on the campaign trail." However, they added that she "writes movingly of election day," but that she "felt gloomy enough to imagine the worst for the party." Out & About Newspaper agreed, suggesting, "the most striking element in this book is her naivete and, at times, the brashness of youth she embodies." They stressed "her lack of experience and her raw feelings," adding that she was "unschooled in groupthink – which she regards as counter to individual freedom," yet "undaunted and energized."

The Christian Science Monitor suggested she did not toe the Republican Party line, but opined that was because she was "the daughter of a maverick." They concluded that she told the reader "tell us more than [they] wanted to know."
