= Paula Faris =

American television correspondent

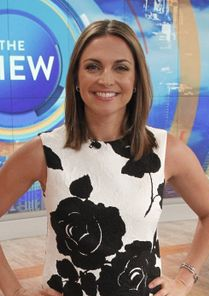
- Born: October 26, 1975 (age 50); Jackson, Michigan, U.S.
- Education: Cedarville University (BA)
- Occupation: Television correspondent
- Years active: 1997–present
- Spouse: John Krueger (m. 2000)
- Children: 3

Paula Faris (born October 26, 1975) is an American journalist and television correspondent, formerly of ABC News. She is known for her tenure as co-anchor of Good Morning America Weekend from 2014 to 2018 and as co-host of The View from 2015 to 2018. Prior to this, Faris co-anchored World News Now and America This Morning.

== Early life and education ==
Faris was born on October 26, 1975, in Jackson, Michigan, where she attended Jackson Christian School. She is a 1997 graduate of Cedarville University with a degree in broadcasting, an emphasis in television production.

== Career ==
After graduation, Faris held several communications-related jobs including an operations position at Mills/James Productions in Columbus, Ohio. She held a job in radio sales, due to limited television opportunities. She eventually found work for a year as a production assistant at WKEF/WRGT and later to occasionally report and anchor. From 2002 to 2005 she was the weekend sports anchor and weekday sports anchor at WCPO-TV in Cincinnati. After her contract expired, she became a sports reporter and anchor at the NBC affiliate WMAQ-TV in Chicago from November 2005 to December 2011.

In December 2011, it was announced that Faris has been hired by ABC's news division, ABC News. She made her debut for the network for its World News Now and America This Morning on January 2, 2012. During this time she occasionally appeared as a fill-in on Good Morning America as well as a correspondent. Faris was later promoted to a New York-based correspondent for all ABC News programs. Her final episode of World News Now and America This Morning was January 22, 2013.

On August 9, 2014, Faris made her debut as co-anchor of Good Morning America Weekend, following the departure of Bianna Golodryga, who moved to Yahoo! News. On August 25, 2015, ABC announced Faris would join The View as a co-host for season 19. On August 3, 2016, it was announced that they have renewed Faris's contract for its twentieth season. She was also renewed as co-host for Season 21. During the series' 20th and 21st seasons, Faris mostly appeared during the program's Friday episodes.

On July 18, 2018, ABC announced Faris would be departing both Good Morning America Weekend and The View to take on a new role within ABC News as well as to start a podcast that takes on the topic of faith produced by the network. She made her final appearance as co-host of The View on July 20, while her final episode as co-anchor of Good Morning America Weekend aired on September 29.

In September 2018, Faris became the senior national correspondent for ABC News. Her podcast, titled Journeys of Faith with Paula Faris, launched on November 14.

== Personal life ==
Faris is of half Lebanese descent; her paternal grandparents were born in Lebanon. Faris met her husband, John Krueger, while at Cedarville University. They married in 2000 and have three children, Caroline Grace (b. 2007), JJ (b. 2009), and Landon (b. January 2014).

Faris is a Christian who speaks openly about her faith.

== Awards and nominations ==
Year	Award	Category	Result	Ref.
2016	Daytime Emmy Award	Outstanding Entertainment Talk Show Host (shared with Joy Behar, Candace Cameron Bure, Michelle Collins, Whoopi Goldberg, Rosie Perez, Raven-Symoné, and Nicolle Wallace)	Nominated	
2017	Daytime Emmy Award	Outstanding Entertainment Talk Show Host (shared with Joy Behar, Jedediah Bila, Candace Cameron Bure, Whoopi Goldberg, Sara Haines, Sunny Hostin, and Raven-Symoné)	Nominated	
2018	Daytime Emmy Award	Outstanding Entertainment Talk Show Host (shared with Joy Behar, Jedediah Bila, Whoopi Goldberg, Sara Haines, Sunny Hostin, and Meghan McCain)	Nominated	

Media offices
Preceded by Rosie Perez; Nicolle Wallace	The View co-host 2015–2018	Succeeded by Abby Huntsman
