= Sunny Hostin =

American lawyer and TV host (born 1968)

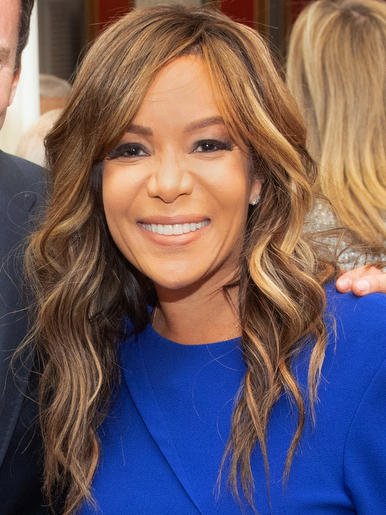
- Hostin in 2020
- Born: Asunción Cummings; October 20, 1968 (age 58); The Bronx, New York, U.S.
- Education: Binghamton University (BA); University of Notre Dame (JD)
- Occupations: Lawyer; Television presenter
- Employer: ABC News
- Notable credits: American Morning legal analyst (2007–2011); The View co-host (2016–present)
- Spouse: Emmanuel Hostin (m. 1998)
- Children: 2
- Website: sunnyhostin.com

Asunción "Sunny" Cummings Hostin (/ˈhɒstɪn/; née Cummings; born October 20, 1968) is an American lawyer, author, and television host. She is a co-host on ABC's morning talk show The View, for which she has received nominations for Daytime Emmy Awards, as well as the Senior Legal Correspondent and Analyst for ABC News. She was also the host and executive producer of Investigation Discovery's true crime series Truth About Murder with Sunny Hostin.

== Early life ==
Hostin was born on October 20, 1968, in New York City to a Puerto Rican mother, Rosa Beza, and an African American father, William Cummings. Her maternal grandfather was a Sephardic Jew.

In 2024, on the PBS series Finding Your Roots, Hostin learned that she has a large amount of Spanish ancestry, is a descendant of Spanish colonists and her fourth great-grandfather was a slave trader. She is 7 percent indigenous Puerto Rican.

Hostin was raised in The Bronx, New York City, attended the all-girls Dominican Academy, and is bilingual in English and Spanish. She received a Bachelor of Arts in English and Rhetoric from Binghamton University and a Juris Doctor from Notre Dame Law School.

== Career ==
Hostin began her career as a law clerk to retired Chief Judge of the Maryland Court of Appeals Robert M. Bell and later became a trial attorney in the United States Department of Justice Antitrust Division. Hostin left the Antitrust Division to become a federal prosecutor, specializing in child sex crimes.

She began her television career as a commentator for Court TV and began using the stage name "Sunny Hostin" after host Nancy Grace was unable to pronounce "Asunción" and asked if she had a nickname she could use instead. Hostin was then offered a spot on the Fox News program The O'Reilly Factor, where she appeared on the show's "Is It Legal?" segments, regularly debating with Bill O'Reilly and Megyn Kelly. She signed with CNN in September 2007 as the legal analyst for its morning show American Morning. In March 2016, it was announced that Hostin was joining ABC News as Senior Legal Correspondent and analyst. She became a permanent co-host of The View beginning the show's twentieth season in September 2016. In 2017, Hostin made a cameo appearance as herself in the comedy film Girls Trip.

In 2019, Hostin hosted and executive-produced the six-episode documentary series Truth About Murder With Sunny Hostin on Investigation Discovery, on which she travels to various parts of the US to explore the stories behind some of the nation's most notorious homicides. She also hosted a podcast titled Have You Seen This Man?, produced by ABC. Hostin released I Am These Truths, a memoir, in 2020. The following year, she released a novel, titled Summer on the Bluffs. The book was to be adapted into a television series. In 2020, Hostin was set to executive-produce The Counsel, a drama television series inspired by her life and career. In 2026, Hostin shared that she had signed with startup Fountain 0 to produce AI films based on her books. She noted "gatekeeping" of Black voices in the entertainment industry, while others noted that this choice would limit the number of jobs created for human Black creatives.

== Personal life ==
Hostin is a member of Alpha Kappa Alpha. She is married to Spanish and Haitian orthopedic surgeon Emmanuel Hostin. In January 2025, he was among 199 defendants accused of insurance fraud in a civil lawsuit filed under the Racketeer Influenced and Corrupt Organizations Act (RICO) in New York.

They have two children, a son and daughter. The family resides in the hamlet of Purchase in the town of Harrison, New York; and own a second home in the Martha's Vineyard community of Oak Bluffs, Massachusetts. Hostin is Catholic.

In June 2026, her son Gabriel Hostin was issued a citation for trespassing in New Rochelle, New York; Hostin is representing him at a court appearance scheduled for July 31. While Gabriel was being detained by police, his mother asserted that she was a federal prosecutor.

In September 2026, Hostin claimed that she was the holdout juror in the 1991 trial of Daniel Rakowitz, known as the "Butcher of Tompkins Square Park". Hostin stated that she successfully persuaded the jury to acquit Rakowitz by reason of insanity, a decision that prevented a guilty verdict and kept him out of prison. Hostin was quoted in The New York Times in February 1991: "We don't think [Rakowitz] intended to kill [Beerle]. But once he did, he dismembered her body in an effort to commit the perfect crime."

== Awards and nominations ==
Year	Award	Category	Result	Ref.
2017	Daytime Emmy Award	Outstanding Entertainment Talk Show Host (shared with Joy Behar, Jedediah Bila, Candace Cameron Bure, Paula Faris, Whoopi Goldberg, Sara Haines, and Raven-Symoné)	Nominated	
2018	Daytime Emmy Award	Outstanding Entertainment Talk Show Host (shared with Joy Behar, Jedediah Bila, Paula Faris, Whoopi Goldberg, Sara Haines, and Meghan McCain)	Nominated	
2019	Daytime Emmy Award	Outstanding Entertainment Talk Show Host (shared with Joy Behar, Whoopi Goldberg, Sara Haines, Abby Huntsman, and Meghan McCain)	Nominated	
2020	Daytime Emmy Award	Outstanding Informative Talk Show Host (shared with Joy Behar, Whoopi Goldberg, Abby Huntsman, Meghan McCain, and Ana Navarro)	Nominated	
2022	Daytime Emmy Award	Outstanding Informative Talk Show Host (shared with Joy Behar, Whoopi Goldberg, Sara Haines, Meghan McCain, and Ana Navarro)	Nominated	
2024	Daytime Emmy Award	Outstanding Daytime Talk Series Host (shared with Joy Behar, Whoopi Goldberg, Alyssa Farah Griffin, Sara Haines, and Ana Navarro)	Nominated	

== See also ==
- New Yorkers in journalism
- Nuyorican
- Puerto Ricans in New York City

Media offices
Preceded by Michelle Collins	The View co-host 2016–present	Incumbent
