= Sara Haines =

American television host and journalist (born 1977)

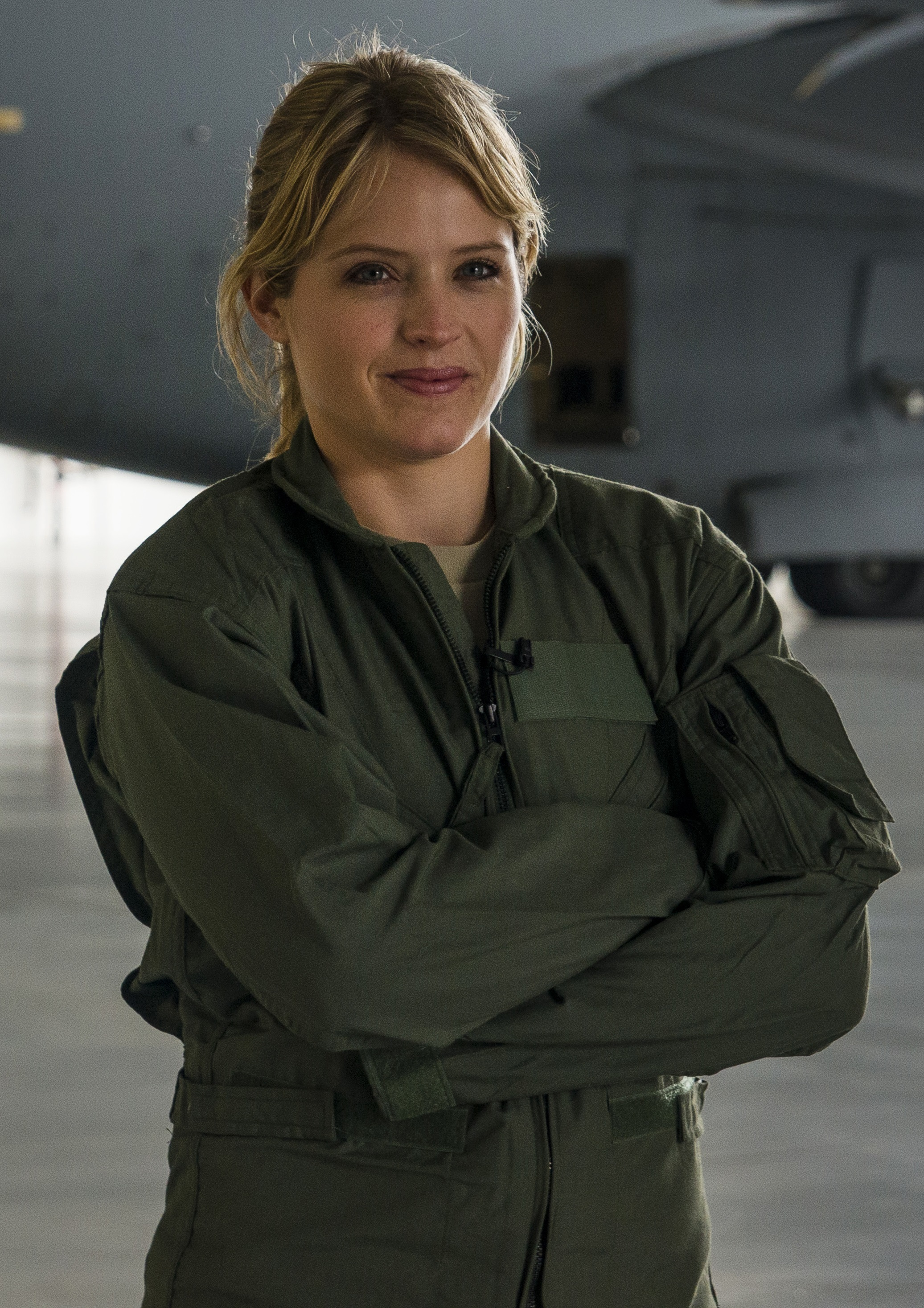
- Haines at the Charleston Air Force Base, 2013
- Born: Sara Hilary Haines; September 18, 1977 (age 49); Newton, Iowa, U.S.
- Education: Smith College (BA)
- Occupations: Television host, journalist
- Known for: The View, Good Morning America, Today
- Spouse: Max Shifrin (m. 2014)
- Children: 3

Sara Hilary Haines (born September 18, 1977) is an American television host and journalist. She is known as one of the co-hosts of the ABC daytime talk shows The View and Strahan, Sara and Keke and the host of the game show The Chase. For her work on the first two series, she received Daytime Emmy Award nominations. She has also worked as a correspondent on Today, ABC News, and Good Morning America.

== Early life and education ==
Haines was born in Newton, Iowa, and raised there with her three siblings. She attended Smith College in Northampton, Massachusetts, where she received a Bachelor of Arts degree in government in 2000. At Smith, Haines played basketball and volleyball.

== Career ==
Haines began her career in the NBC Page Program. After nine months in the program, she became the production coordinator for NBC's Today at Rockefeller Center in 2002. In 2009, Haines became the show's fourth-hour's contributing correspondent until departing in 2013.

In 2013, Haines became an ABC News correspondent as well as the pop news anchor for the weekend editions of Good Morning America. After multiple appearances as a guest co-host, Haines joined The View as a permanent co-host in the show's 20th season, which premiered on September 6, 2016. On July 23, 2018, ABC announced that she would not return to The View for season 22 and that she would co-host GMA Day, later renamed Strahan and Sara, with Michael Strahan. Haines made her final appearance as a co-host during the 21st season's penultimate episode on August 2.

Haines's debuted as co-host of GMA Day during the series premiere on September 10, 2018. In August 2019, the program was renamed GMA3: Strahan, Sara and Keke, with the addition of Keke Palmer as a third co-host. Haines returned to The View as a frequent guest co-host in 2020. Following the reformatting of GMA3 that same year, Haines permanently returned to The View for its 24th season. In November 2020, it was reported that Haines would host a revival of The Chase on ABC. The series premiered in January 2021. She made an appearance as herself in the second episode of the Disney+ superhero series The Falcon and the Winter Soldier, interviewing the character John Walker about his role as the new Captain America.

== Recognition ==
On her birthday in 2022, in appreciation of her accomplishments as a journalist and TV host, Newton's mayor Mike Hanson proclaimed September 18 as "Sara Haines Day" in Newton, Iowa.

== Personal life ==
Haines married attorney Max Shifrin in November 2014 after initially meeting online. The couple resides in New Jersey. Their first child was born in March 2016, followed by their second in December 2017, and their third in June 2019. Haines had postpartum depression following the birth of her first child, which lasted approximately a year. She is Christian.

Haines grew up in what she describes as a "conservative household" and identifies as a "left-leaning moderate".

== Awards and nominations ==
Year	Award	Category	Result	Ref.
2017	Daytime Emmy Awards	Outstanding Entertainment Talk Show Host for The View (shared with Joy Behar, Jedediah Bila, Candace Cameron Bure, Paula Faris, Whoopi Goldberg, Sunny Hostin, and Raven-Symoné)	Nominated	
2018	Daytime Emmy Awards	Outstanding Entertainment Talk Show Host for The View (shared with Joy Behar, Jedediah Bila, Paula Faris, Whoopi Goldberg, Sunny Hostin, and Meghan McCain)	Nominated	
2019	Daytime Emmy Awards	Outstanding Entertainment Talk Show Host for The View (shared with Joy Behar, Whoopi Goldberg, Sunny Hostin, Abby Huntsman, and Meghan McCain)	Nominated	
2020	Daytime Emmy Awards	Outstanding Entertainment Talk Show Host for GMA3 (shared with Keke Palmer and Michael Strahan)	Nominated	
2022	Daytime Emmy Awards	Outstanding Informative Talk Show Host for The View (shared with Joy Behar, Whoopi Goldberg, Sunny Hostin, Meghan McCain, and Ana Navarro)	Nominated	
2024	Daytime Emmy Awards	Outstanding Daytime Talk Series Host (shared with Joy Behar, Whoopi Goldberg, Alyssa Farah Griffin, Sunny Hostin, and Ana Navarro)	Nominated	
