= Meghan McCain =

American television personality (born 1984)

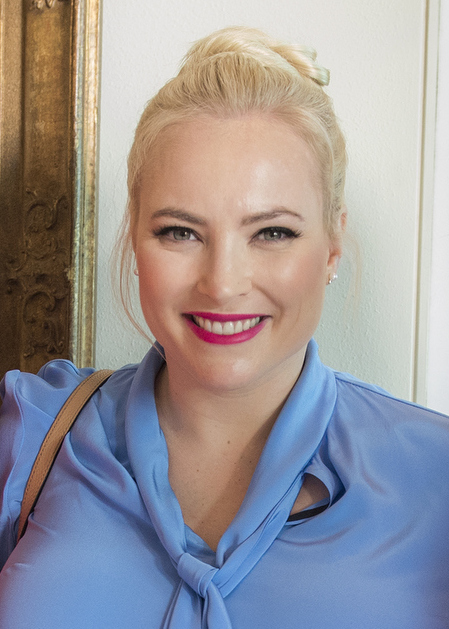
- McCain in 2018
- Born: Meghan Marguerite McCain; October 23, 1984 (age 42); Phoenix, Arizona, U.S.
- Education: Columbia University (BA)
- Occupations: Television personality; columnist; author
- Political party: Republican (2008–present); Independent (2002–2008)
- Spouse: Ben Domenech (m. 2017)
- Children: 3
- Parents: John McCain (father); Cindy McCain (mother)
- Relatives: McCain family

Meghan Marguerite McCain (born October 23, 1984) is an American television personality, columnist, and author. She has worked for ABC News, Fox News, and MSNBC. She is the daughter of politician John McCain and diplomat Cindy McCain. McCain has been a public figure for much of her life, first appearing at the 1996 Republican National Convention.

McCain received media attention in 2007 for her blog, McCain Blogette. On the blog, she documented life during the John McCain 2008 presidential campaign. In 2009, she became a contributing writer for The Daily Beast. From 2016 to 2017, she co-hosted the daytime talk show Outnumbered. She joined the daytime talk show The View shortly thereafter, co-hosting it until 2021. McCain became a columnist for the Daily Mail website following her departure from The View. Since 2023 she has also hosted her own podcast called Citizen McCain.

== Early life and education ==
McCain is the eldest of the four children of Senator John McCain and Cindy McCain. She was born on October 23, 1984, in Phoenix, Arizona, and attended Phoenix Country Day School and Xavier College Preparatory, an all-girl private Catholic high school. She appeared at the 1996 Republican National Convention when she was 11 years of age. On April 5, 2003, McCain was presented to society at the Board of Visitors Debutante Ball at the Camelback Inn in Paradise Valley, Arizona.

She attended Columbia University, where she earned her Bachelor of Arts in art history in 2007. McCain originally planned to become a music journalist and interned at Newsweek and Saturday Night Live.

== Career ==
=== 2008 presidential election ===
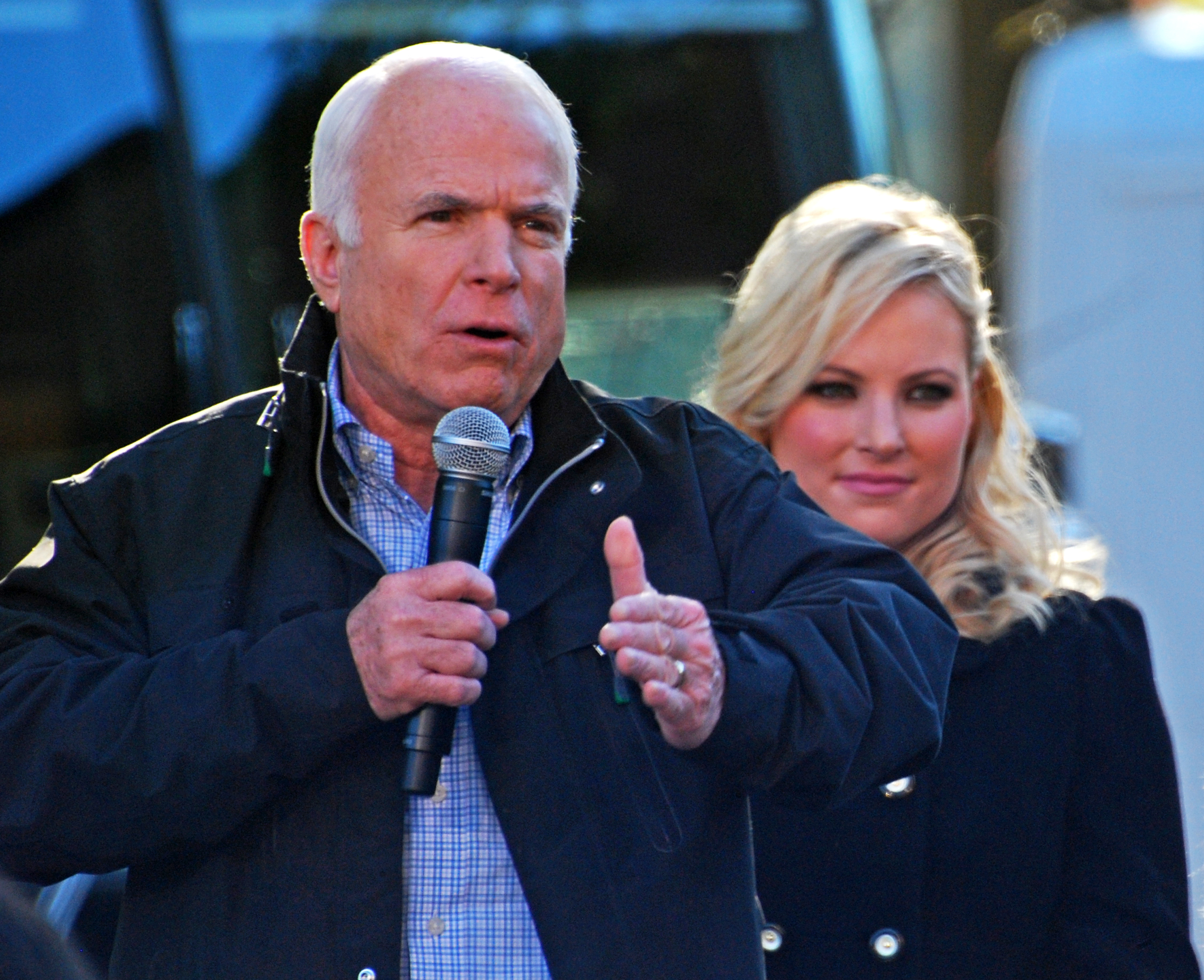
McCain campaigning with her father in 2008

McCain launched a blog entitled McCain Blogette in 2007, documenting her father's presidential campaign as well as musing about fashion, music, and pop culture. On June 12, 2008, McCain wrote on her blog that she had changed her party registration to Republican. She said she did so "as a symbol of my commitment to my dad and to represent the faith I have in his ability to be an effective leader for our country and to grow and strengthen the Republican party when he is elected president of the United States." In her book Dirty Sexy Politics, McCain states that she nearly overdosed on Xanax on Election Day. In 2008, she published a book entitled My Dad, John McCain.

Although her blogging was devoted to gaining support for her father among the Millennial electorate, by October 2008, Steve Schmidt and other McCain campaign staffers substantially limited her appearances on the campaign trail because they deemed her "too controversial". Furthermore, Schmidt and other staffers on the campaign have also claimed that McCain was verbally abusive to staff throughout the campaign and would throw "tantrums" that included "raging, screaming, [and] crying" at Secret Service officials, campaign staff and make-up staff. At one point, she was reportedly not allowed on her father's plane. While McCain has denied the allegations, she herself writes in her book, that she was "fired" from the campaign, because she was perceived by those in charge to be "a curse, a brat, a diva, a monstrous daughter-of".

McCain's campaign memoir, Dirty Sexy Politics, was published in September 2010. In it, she expresses opinions about Sarah Palin and describes her relationship with McCain campaign staff. She states that the Republican Party seemed "to have lost its way in the last ten years" and added that the conservative movement seemed "hell-bent on restricting our freedoms rather than expanding them". The New York Times described McCain's book as a coming-of-age narrative about herself. Other reviews were more scathing. Leon H. Wolf wrote, "It is impossible to read Dirty, Sexy Politics and come away with the impression that you have read anything other than the completely unedited ramblings of an idiot". During the promotional tour for the book, McCain canceled an appearance at Juniata College owing to what she called "unforeseen professional circumstances". According to her Twitter feed, she was actually in Las Vegas on a girls' weekend after having been dumped by a boyfriend via e-mail. Politico stated that while John McCain did not emerge victorious from the 2008 election, "his Bud Light–drinking, talk-show–appearing, insouciantly Twittering 24-year-old daughter" did.

=== Media career ===
McCain began writing for The Daily Beast in January 2009. In March 2009, McCain wrote an article for The Daily Beast entitled "My Beef With Ann Coulter." In this article, McCain questioned why Republicans support Coulter, calling her "offensive, radical, insulting, and confusing". While Coulter did not respond, conservative radio talk show host Laura Ingraham challenged McCain's article by comparing her to a "valley girl." Ingraham also mocked McCain: "Ok, I was really hoping that I was going to get that role in The Real World, but then I realized that, well, they don't like plus-sized models." McCain responded to Ingraham in another article for The Daily Beast entitled "Quit Talking About My Weight, Laura Ingraham": "Instead of intellectually debating our ideological differences about the future of the Republican Party, Ingraham resorted to making fun of my age and weight, in the fashion of the mean girls in high school".

In September 2009 and February 2010, McCain had repeat stints as guest co-host of The View.

In September 2010, she appeared on the NPR news quiz show Wait, Wait, Don't Tell Me and won a prize for a listener.

In May 2011, McCain joined celebrities like Brandy Norwood, Tatyana Ali and Danielle Fishel in appearing naked in a public service announcement for skin cancer awareness.

In November 2011, McCain became an analyst on MSNBC. McCain clashed with 2012 Republican presidential candidate and former Speaker of the U.S. House Newt Gingrich saying that he was an "older candidate" with "old ideas".

A month-long road trip with comedian Michael Ian Black in the summer of 2011 led to a collaboration on the 2012 book America, You Sexy Bitch: A Love Letter to Freedom. In it, McCain lambasts Republican strategist Karl Rove for what she believes was his role in the attacks against her younger sister in her father's 2000 presidential campaign, castigates Bill Clinton for his actions in the Lewinsky scandal, but despite ideological differences, praises Hillary Clinton for having "pushed through many doors and shattered many glass ceilings for women in politics. I love women who don't put up with shit, and Hillary clearly doesn't."

In 2012, McCain posed for the April issue of Playboy wearing a red-sequined dress and blue stilettos and spoke to the magazine about a wide range of subjects, including her sex life.

In September 2013, her road-based talk show Raising McCain began on the start-up Pivot cable and satellite television channel. It was canceled in January 2014. She was later added as a co-host to the show TakePart Live on the same channel, appearing with Jacob Soboroff beginning in May 2014. The show was canceled in December 2014.

She signed on as a Fox News contributor in July 2015 and was named a regular co-host of the afternoon talk program Outnumbered on November 14, 2016. McCain left FOX News in September 2017.

Following her departure from both the program and the network in September 2017, McCain was named a permanent co-host of the ABC daytime talk show The View. She made her debut on the October 9, 2017, episode. She had previously guest co-hosted the show in 2008 and 2010. She announced her exit from the show after her fourth season in July 2021.

In September 2021, McCain became an opinion columnist for the tabloid newspaper the Daily Mail. As of July 2026, she still writes columns for the Daily Mail.

In April 2022, McCain published a memoir entitled Bad Republican. The memoir sold 244 copies in its opening week and was described by the conservative Washington Examiner and progressive Salon as a flop.

McCain launched her podcast, Meghan McCain Has Entered the Chat, in late 2023. She later renamed her podcast "Citizen McCain". It is a semiweekly podcast on the 2WAY Network hosted by Meghan McCain with her co-host Miranda Wilkins. The program combines political commentary with discussions of popular culture, current events, and American cultural themes. McCain has expanded the show by merging its YouTube format with a podcast, broadening the show's scope and audience. The show has featured numerous public figures; specifcally, the show highlights conservative women, including Usha Vance, Tulsi Gabbard, Winsome Earle-Sears, Sarah Huckabee Sanders, Elise Stefanik, and Lara Trump.

== Political positions ==
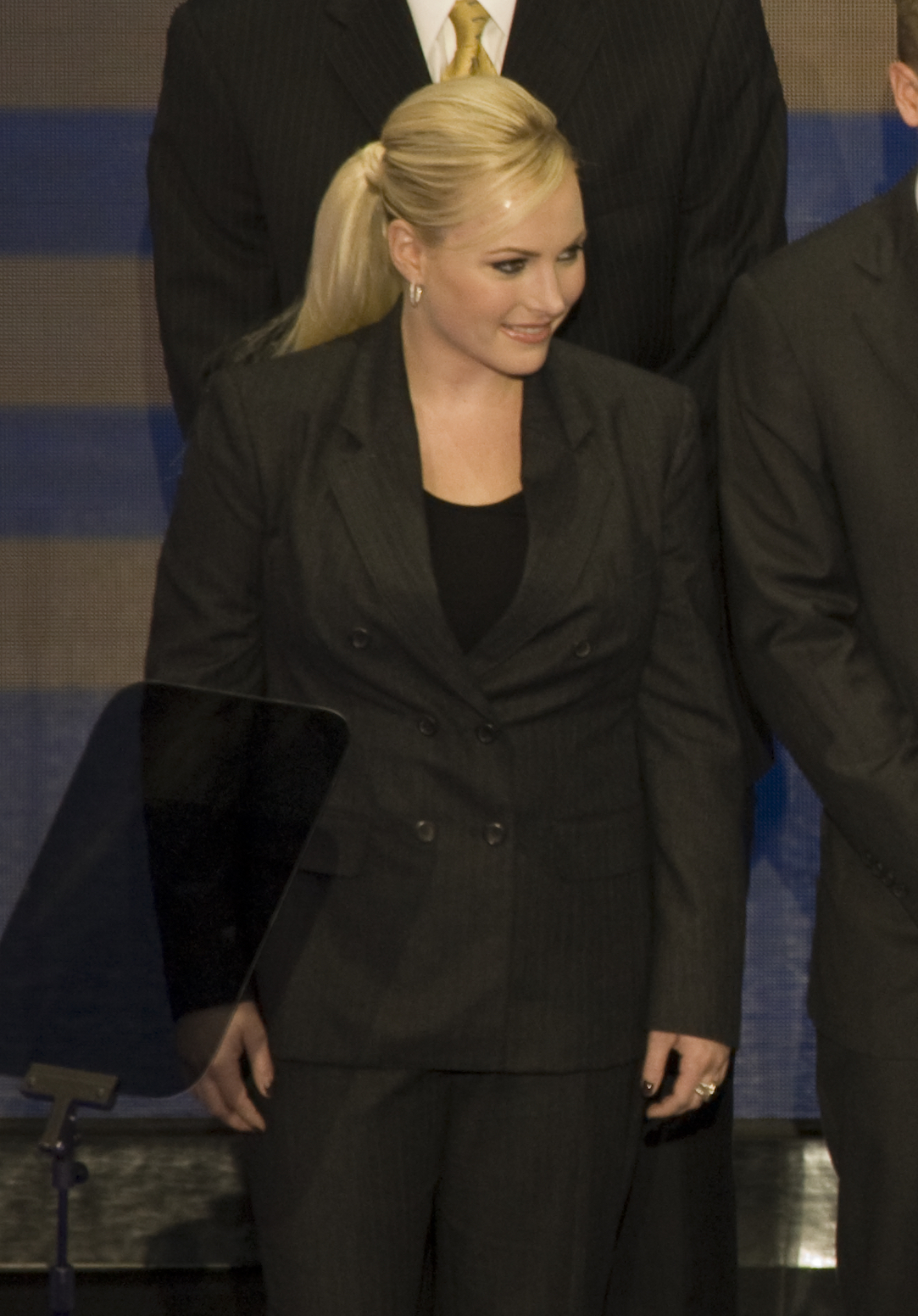
McCain at the 2008 Republican National Convention

McCain describes herself as "a woman who despises labels and boxes and stereotypes" and politically identifies as a Republican who is "liberal on social issues." She registered as an independent voter when she was 18 years old in 2002, but became a member of the Republican Party in 2008. McCain has also said, "All I am trying to be is a young, cool Republican woman for other Republican women."

Speaking at the 2009 Log Cabin Republican Convention, McCain said there was "a war brewing in the Republican Party" between the past and the future, and that "most of the old school Republicans are scared shitless of that future." Statements such as these led news reports and commentators including Rachel Maddow and Kathleen Parker to conclude that McCain had the same "maverick gene" as her father. After U.S. Senator Arlen Specter left the Republican Party for the Democratic Party in April 2009, conservative commentator Rush Limbaugh asserted that many Republicans wished both McCain and her father would leave the Republican Party as well. In response, McCain tweeted, "RED TIL I'M DEAD BABY!!! I love the republican party enough to give it constructive criticism, I love my party and sure as hell not leavin!".

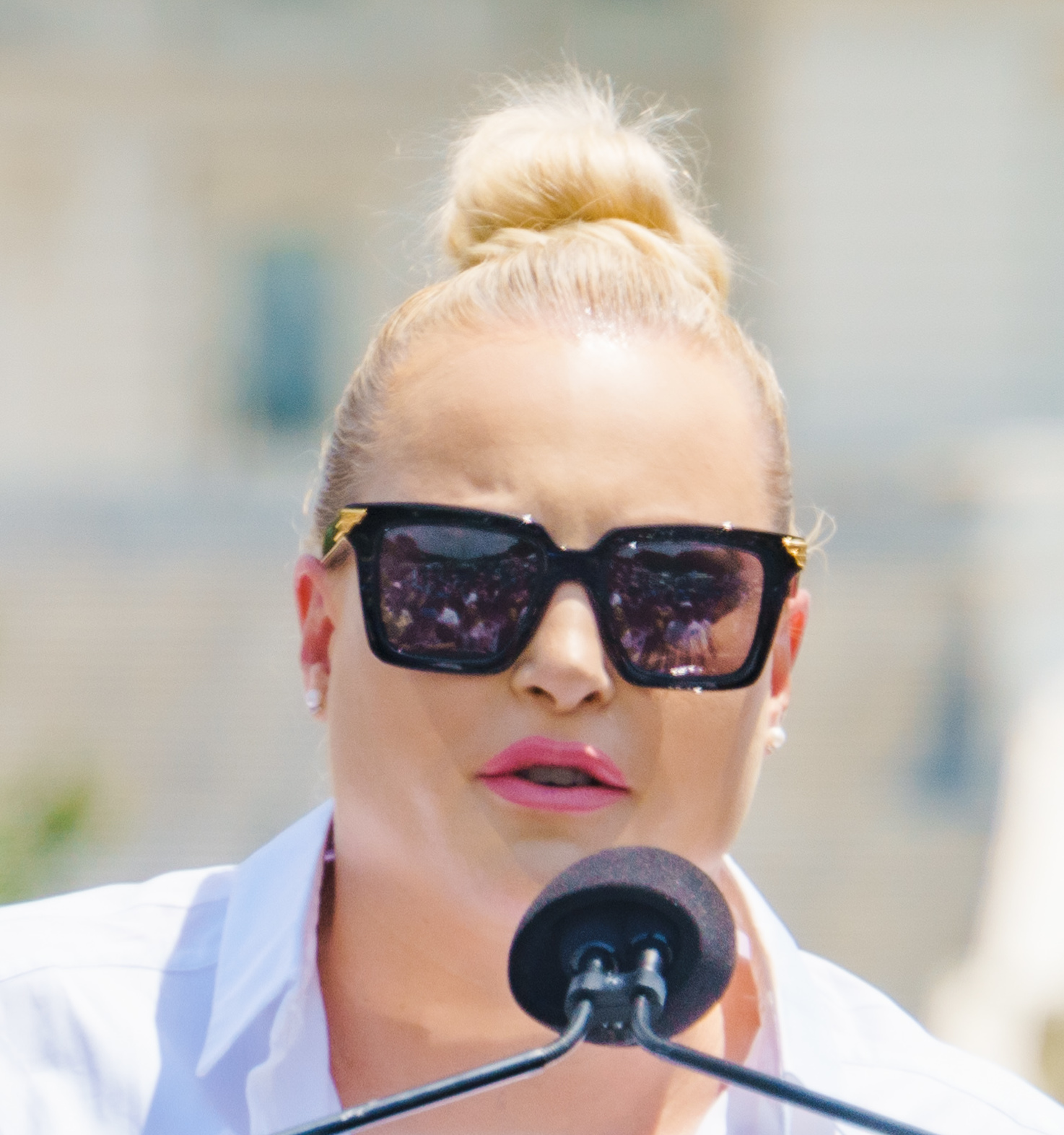
McCain speaking at the 'NO FEAR: Rally in Solidarity with the Jewish People' rally in Washington, DC. in 2021.

McCain has campaigned for gay rights, and she has commented that the cause of the gay community for equality is "one of the ones closest to my heart." She supports same-sex marriage and gay adoption. She was in favor of repealing "Don't ask, don't tell" and allowing gays and lesbians to serve openly in the U.S. military, a position her father adopted prior to his 2008 presidential run. In this way, she spoke at the Log Cabin Republicans convention in April 2009, describing her cultural and political perspectives with the declaration: "I am concerned about the environment. I love to wear black. I think government is best when it stays out of people's lives and business as much as possible. I love punk rock. I believe in a strong national defense. I have a tattoo. I believe government should always be efficient and accountable. I have lots of gay friends. And, yes, I am a Republican." After Joe the Plumber said he would not have "queers ... anywhere near my children" in mid-2009, Meghan McCain took aim at him, saying "Joe the Plumber—you can quote me—is a dumbass. He should stick to plumbing." In June 2009, McCain posed for the NOH8 Campaign, a celebrity photo project that protests California's Proposition 8 constitutional amendment banning same-sex marriage, which her mother Cindy also posed for. She also co-hosted GLAAD's Concert for Love and Acceptance in Nashville in 2015. McCain described the Trump administration's ban on transgender service as "an unfair, un-American, and dangerous policy."

She has stated she is anti-abortion as well as in favor of sex education and birth control. She has also, however, expressed an opinion that conservatives demonstrate hypocrisy regarding abortion: "They go on and on about how evil and wrong abortion is, but don't like to talk about how easy it is to not get pregnant." On a May 2009 episode of the Colbert Report, McCain stated her support for sex education and criticized Bristol Palin's sexual abstinence campaign, saying it was "not realistic for this generation". McCain also argued that the Republican Party "can be a party for a 24-year-old pro-sex woman. It can be."

At first, McCain had doubts about the 2003 invasion of Iraq but subsequently supported her father's pro-intervention position regarding it.

She voted for Democrat John Kerry in the 2004 presidential election over Republican George W. Bush.

She objected to the Arizona SB1070 anti-illegal immigration law, which her father supported.

In terms of economic policy, she once remarked on The Rachel Maddow Show: "I didn't even take econ[omics] in college. I don't completely understand it so I'd hate to make a comment one way or the other. That's—truly of all the things—I keep reading and I just don't understand it."

In the 2016 presidential election, she did not vote for Hillary Clinton or Donald Trump, instead writing in Evan McMullin.

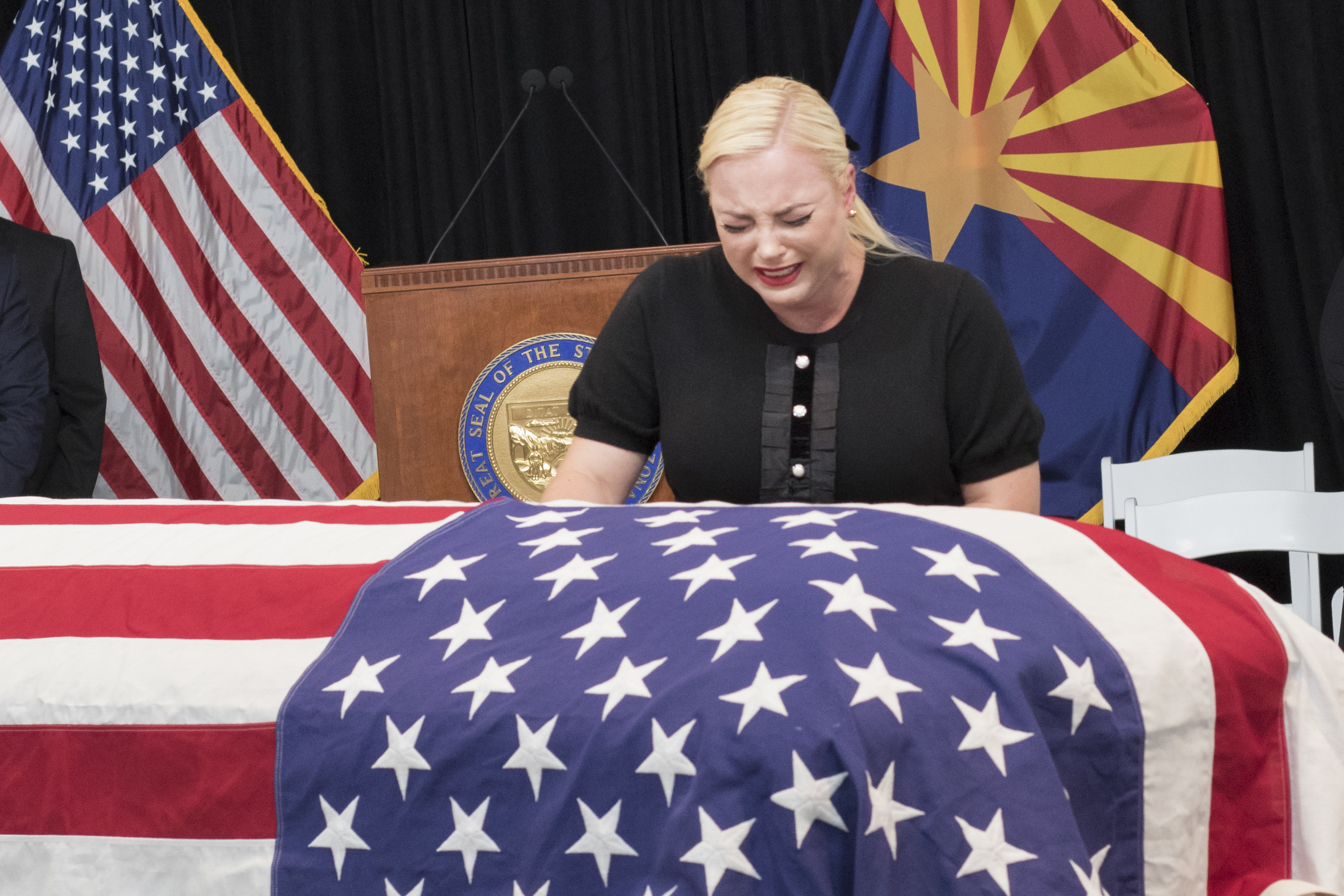
McCain weeps next to her father's casket laying in state at the Arizona State Capitol, Aug. 29, 2018.

On September 1, 2018, she delivered a eulogy at her father's funeral at Washington National Cathedral; McCain mourned her father's passing as the "passing of American greatness, the real thing." In what was widely seen as a sharp rebuke of Donald Trump, McCain remarked: "The America of John McCain has no need to be made great again because America was always great." McCain has publicly discussed her struggles with grief following the death of her father in 2018. In December 2019, McCain spoke at the annual End Well Symposium about challenging taboos and destigmatizing conversations about grief and death. McCain has since voiced regrets on her and her family's handling of her father's glioblastoma diagnosis saying, "I also have a lot of regrets almost a decade since my dad’s passing. My family should have forced him to step down the second he was diagnosed."

In 2019, she became a vocal critic of Ilhan Omar, the Democratic representative for Minnesota's 5th congressional district, over comments Omar made which some conservatives considered antisemitic. McCain criticized and repeated these comments after Omar apologized for them, and tried to link them to acts of antisemitic violence such as the Poway synagogue shooting, which was criticized by many as a false equivalence and a form of whataboutism deflecting from the white supremacist ideology of the shooter. Host Seth Meyers also accused McCain on his television show of conflating Omar's criticism of Israel with antisemitism, and diminishing death threats against Omar as a result of her previous comments.

In the 2020 presidential election, she voted for Democrat Joe Biden over Republican Donald Trump.

McCain spoke out against the 2021 United States Capitol attack, saying on The View: "I'm not against sending these people to Gitmo. ... These are domestic terrorists who attacked our own republic. They should be treated the same way we treat Al-Qaeda." She also said, "The bedrock of our democracy and the bedrock of who we are as Americans is the peaceful transition of power. And he is clearly a president who has turned into a mad king." She then called for the Twenty-fifth Amendment to the United States Constitution to be invoked and Trump to be removed from office.

In the 2024 presidential election, she did not vote for Kamala Harris or Donald Trump, instead writing in her deceased father John McCain. However, after Trump won and returned to the White House for his second term, McCain attended the swearing in of her "personal friend" Tulsi Gabbard as Director of National Intelligence where she said Trump was "very kind and very nice". McCain added that "the second President Trump term: I much prefer it, I really like the tone."

== Personal life ==
In July 2017, McCain became engaged to conservative writer and commentator Ben Domenech. They were married on November 21, 2017, at McCain's family ranch in Page Springs, Arizona. In July 2019, McCain revealed that she had miscarried earlier that year. She gave birth to the couple's first daughter in September 2020, who is the goddaughter of Tulsi Gabbard and her husband Abraham. She gave birth to a second daughter in January 2023, and a son in 2026.

== Awards and nominations ==
| Year | Award | Category | Nominated work | Result | Ref. |
|---|---|---|---|---|---|
| 2014 | GLAAD Media Award | Outstanding Talk Show Episode | Raising McCain | Nominated | |
| 2018 | Daytime Emmy Award | Outstanding Entertainment Talk Show Host (with Joy Behar, Jedediah Bila, Paula Faris, Whoopi Goldberg, Sara Haines and Sunny Hostin) | The View | Nominated | |
| 2019 | Daytime Emmy Award | Outstanding Entertainment Talk Show Host (with Joy Behar, Whoopi Goldberg, Sara Haines, Sunny Hostin and Abby Huntsman) | The View | Nominated | |
| 2020 | Daytime Emmy Award | Outstanding Informative Talk Show Host (with Joy Behar, Whoopi Goldberg, Sunny Hostin, Abby Huntsman and Ana Navarro) | The View | Nominated | |
| 2022 | Daytime Emmy Award | Outstanding Informative Talk Show Host (with Joy Behar, Whoopi Goldberg, Sara Haines, Sunny Hostin and Ana Navarro) | The View | Nominated | |

== Writings ==
- McCain, Meghan (2008). My Dad, John McCain. New York: Aladdin Paperbacks. ISBN 978-1-4169-7528-1. OCLC 230206464.
- McCain, Meghan (2010). Dirty Sexy Politics. Hyperion. ISBN 978-1-4013-2377-6.
- McCain, Meghan; Black, Michael Ian (2012). America, You Sexy Bitch: A Love Letter to Freedom. Da Capo Press. ISBN 978-0-307-99023-5.
- McCain, Meghan (2022). Bad Republican: A Memoir. BenBella Books. ISBN 978-1-637-74213-6.

== See also ==
- Broadcast journalism
- New Yorkers in journalism

Media offices
| Preceded by Jedediah Bila; Candace Cameron Bure; Raven-Symoné | The View co-host 2017–2021 | Succeeded by Alyssa Farah Griffin |
