= Daytime Emmy Award for Outstanding Entertainment Talk Show Host =

Television award category

- Awarded for: Outstanding Host in an Entertainment Talk Show
- Country: United States
- Presented by: NATAS/ATAS
- First award: April 26, 2015
- Final award: June 24, 2022
- Currently held by: Kelly Clarkson, The Kelly Clarkson Show (2022)
- Website: theemmys.tv/daytime/

The Daytime Emmy Award for Outstanding Entertainment Talk Show Host was an award annually presented by the National Academy of Television Arts and Sciences (NATAS) and Academy of Television Arts & Sciences (ATAS). The award was given in honor of a talk show host that was in the entertainment nature. It was awarded from the 42nd Daytime Emmy Awards ceremony, held in 2015, to the 49th Daytime Emmy Awards ceremony, held in 2022. During this period, the generic Outstanding Talk Show Host category was split into two specific categories: this award and Outstanding Informative Talk Show Host. In 2023, the NATAS will merge the two specific categories back into one.

== Winners and nominees ==
Listed below are the winners of the award for each year, as well as the other nominees.

Table key
‡	Indicates the winner

=== 2010s ===
Year	Host(s)	Program	Network	Ref
2015 (42nd)	Kelly Ripa and Michael Strahan ‡	Live! with Kelly and Michael	Syndicated	
2015 (42nd)	Julie Chen, Sara Gilbert, Sharon Osbourne, Aisha Tyler and Sheryl Underwood	The Talk	CBS	
2015 (42nd)	Wendy Williams	The Wendy Williams Show	Syndicated	
2016 (43rd)	Kelly Ripa and Michael Strahan ‡	Live! with Kelly and Michael	Syndicated	
2016 (43rd)	Adrienne Bailon, Tamar Braxton, Loni Love, Jeannie Mai and Tamera Mowry-Housley	The Real	Syndicated	
2016 (43rd)	Julie Chen, Sara Gilbert, Sharon Osbourne, Aisha Tyler and Sheryl Underwood	The Talk	CBS	
2016 (43rd)	Joy Behar, Candace Cameron Bure, Michelle Collins, Paula Faris, Whoopi Goldberg, Rosie Perez, Raven-Symoné and Nicolle Wallace	The View	ABC	
2016 (43rd)	Wendy Williams	The Wendy Williams Show	Syndicated	
2017 (44th)	Julie Chen, Sara Gilbert, Sharon Osbourne, Aisha Tyler and Sheryl Underwood ‡	The Talk	CBS	
2017 (44th)	Harry Connick Jr.	Harry	Syndicated	
2017 (44th)	Kelly Ripa	Live! with Kelly	Syndicated	
2017 (44th)	Tamar Braxton, Adrienne Houghton, Loni Love, Jeannie Mai and Tamera Mowry-Housley	The Real	Syndicated	
2017 (44th)	Joy Behar, Jedediah Bila, Candace Cameron Bure, Paula Faris, Whoopi Goldberg, Sara Haines, Sunny Hostin and Raven-Symoné	The View	ABC	
2017 (44th)	Wendy Williams	The Wendy Williams Show	Syndicated	
2018 (45th)	Adrienne Houghton, Loni Love, Tamera Mowry-Housley, and Jeannie Mai ‡	The Real	Syndicated	
2018 (45th)	Harry Connick Jr.	Harry	Syndicated	
2018 (45th)	Kelly Ripa and Ryan Seacrest	Live! with Kelly and Ryan	Syndicated	
2018 (45th)	Jedediah Bila, Joy Behar, Paula Faris, Whoopi Goldberg, Sara Haines, Sunny Hostin and Meghan McCain	The View	ABC	
2018 (45th)	Julie Chen, Sara Gilbert, Sharon Osbourne, Aisha Tyler and Sheryl Underwood	The Talk	CBS	
2019 (46th)	Kelly Ripa and Ryan Seacrest ‡	Live! with Kelly and Ryan	Syndicated	
2019 (46th)	Adrienne Houghton, Loni Love, Jeannie Mai, and Tamera Mowry-Housley	The Real	Syndicated	
2019 (46th)	Julie Chen, Sara Gilbert, Carrie Ann Inaba, Sharon Osbourne, Eve and Sheryl Underwood	The Talk	CBS	
2019 (46th)	Joy Behar, Abby Huntsman, Whoopi Goldberg, Sara Haines, Sunny Hostin and Meghan McCain	The View	ABC	
2019 (46th)	Wendy Williams	The Wendy Williams Show	Syndicated	

=== 2020s ===
Year	Host(s)	Program	Network	Ref
2020 (47th)	Kelly Clarkson ‡	The Kelly Clarkson Show	Syndicated	
2020 (47th)	Michael Strahan, Sara Haines, and Keke Palmer	GMA3: Strahan, Sara and Keke	ABC	
2020 (47th)	Kelly Ripa and Ryan Seacrest	Live! with Kelly and Ryan	Syndicated	
2020 (47th)	Maury Povich	Maury	Syndicated	
2020 (47th)	Sara Gilbert, Sharon Osbourne, Sheryl Underwood, Eve, Carrie Ann Inaba, and Marie Osmond	The Talk	CBS	
2021 (48th)	Kelly Clarkson ‡	The Kelly Clarkson Show	Syndicated	
2021 (48th)	Drew Barrymore	The Drew Barrymore Show	Syndicated	
2021 (48th)	Sean Evans	Hot Ones	YouTube	
2021 (48th)	Hoda Kotb and Jenna Bush Hager	Today with Hoda & Jenna	NBC	
2021 (48th)	Kelly Ripa and Ryan Seacrest	Live! with Kelly and Ryan	Syndicated	
2022 (49th)	Kelly Clarkson ‡	The Kelly Clarkson Show	Syndicated	
2022 (49th)	Drew Barrymore	The Drew Barrymore Show	Syndicated	
2022 (49th)	Hoda Kotb and Jenna Bush Hager	Today with Hoda & Jenna	NBC	
2022 (49th)	Kelly Ripa and Ryan Seacrest	Live! with Kelly and Ryan	Syndicated	

== Multiple wins ==
3 wins

- Kelly Clarkson
- Kelly Ripa

2 wins

- Michael Strahan

== Multiple nominations ==
8 nominations

- Kelly Ripa

6 nominations

- Sara Gilbert
- Sharon Osborne
- Sheryl Underwood

5 nominations

- Julie Chen
- Ryan Seacrest

4 nominations

- Joy Behar
- Whoopi Goldberg
- Adrienne Houghton
- Loni Love
- Jeannie Mai
- Tamera Mowry-Housley
- Aisha Tyler
- Wendy Williams

3 nominations

- Kelly Clarkson
- Paula Faris
- Sunny Hostin
- Sara Haines
- Michael Strahan

2 nominations

- Tamar Braxton
- Drew Barrymore
- Jedediah Bila
- Candace Cameron Bure
- Jenna Bush Hager
- Harry Connick Jr.
- Eve
- Carrie Ann Inaba
- Hoda Kotb
- Meghan McCain
- Raven-Symoné
