= Candace Cameron Bure =

American actress (born 1976)

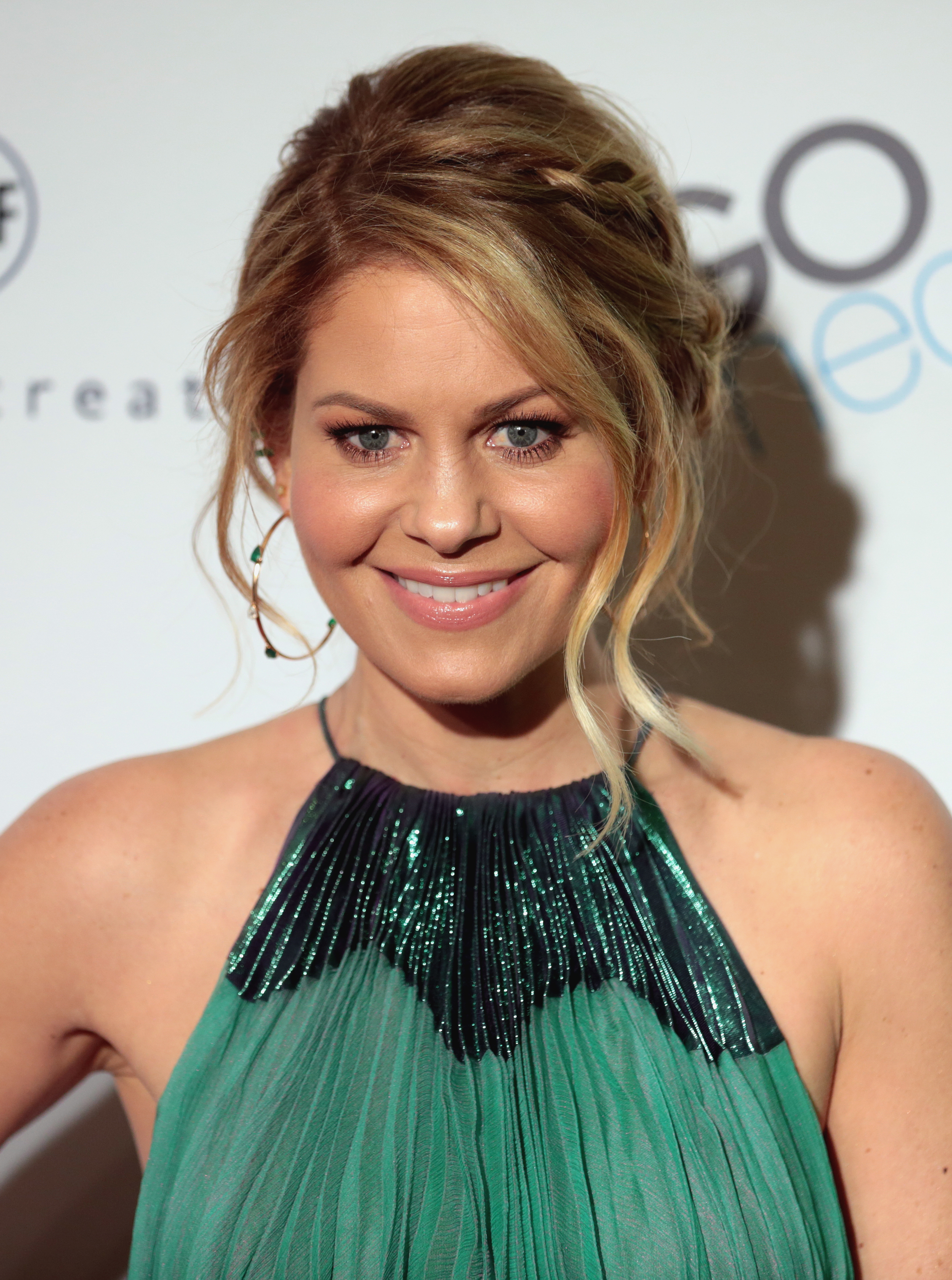
- Cameron Bure in 2018
- Born: Candace Helaine Cameron; April 6, 1976 (age 50); Los Angeles, California, U.S.
- Occupations: Actress; Author; Podcast Host; Public Speaker
- Years active: 1982–present
- Known for: D. J. Tanner on Full House and Fuller House; Aurora Teagarden on Aurora Teagarden Mysteries
- Political party: Republican
- Spouse: Valeri Bure (m. 1996)
- Children: 3
- Relatives: Kirk Cameron (brother); Bradley Steven Perry (son-in-law)
- Website: candacecbure.com

Candace Helaine Cameron Bure (/bʊˈreɪ/; born April 6, 1976) is an American actress, author and former talk show panelist best known as D. J. Tanner in Full House and Fuller House, Summer van Horne in Make It or Break It, and many Hallmark Channel original films—including the title character in their adaptations of the Aurora Teagarden novel series.

In 2014, she was a finalist on season 18 of Dancing with the Stars, finishing in third place. Bure also had minor roles as Cindy Nelson in Some Kind of Wonderful, Carrie Krytsick in Punchline, and voiced the titular character in F.R.E.D.I. From 2015 to 2016, she was a co-host of the daytime television talk show The View. In 2022, Bure became chief content officer of Great American Media.

== Early life ==
Candace Cameron was born in Panorama City, California. Her parents are Barbara (née Bausmith), a homemaker and manager for her children's early acting careers, and Robert Cameron, a former school teacher. She has three siblings, including former child actor and evangelist Kirk Cameron.

== Career ==
Cameron guest-starred in roles on shows such as St. Elsewhere, Growing Pains, and Who's the Boss?. In 1985, she portrayed Jennifer Bates in an episode of the sitcom Punky Brewster. In 1987, she had a role as the youngest sister of Eric Stoltz in the teen comedy Some Kind of Wonderful.

Also in 1987, at the age of 11, Cameron began the most prominent role of her career on the ensemble sitcom Full House, as Donna Jo "D. J." Tanner, the oldest daughter of Bob Saget's Danny Tanner. She was cast throughout the eight seasons of the series until its end in 1995.

While on Full House, Cameron was also featured in Camp Cucamonga, an adventure comedy. She guest-starred in the failed pilot Real Mature, and in an episode of Bill Nye the Science Guy as "Candace the Science Gal". She also appeared in the Tom Hanks and Sally Field feature film Punchline.

Cameron hosted the Nickelodeon Kids' Choice Awards in 1990 with Full House co-star Dave Coulier and David Faustino, and again in 1994 with Joey Lawrence and Marc Weiner.

=== After Full House ===
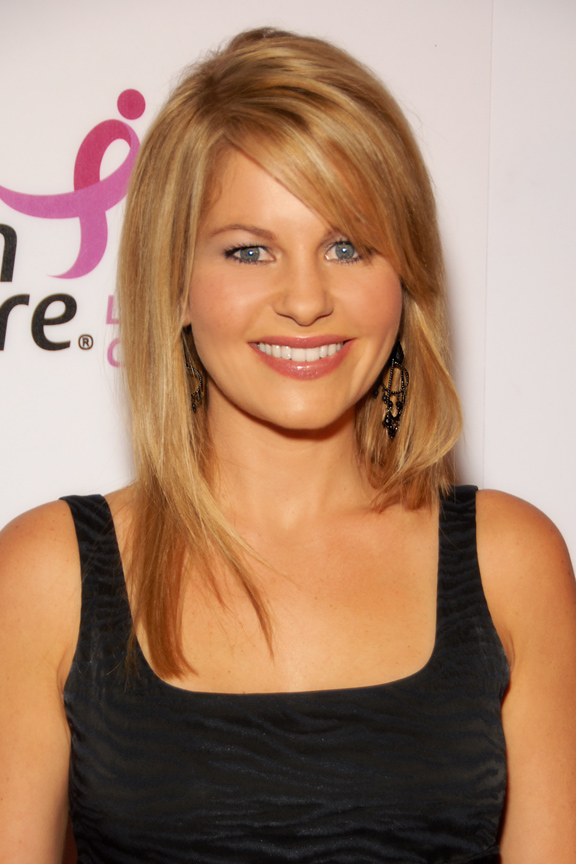
Bure at Susan G. Komen for the Cure in 2009

After Full House ended in 1995, Bure guest-starred on Cybill and Boy Meets World.

Bure also appeared in numerous NBC made for TV movies, including No One Would Tell, playing an abused teen; She Cried No, as a date-raped teen; and NightScream, a mystery.

After giving birth, Bure took a self imposed hiatus from television and film to focus on her family. In the 2000s, she appeared as an interviewee on the retrospective I Love the '80s and I Love the '80s Strikes Back. She would later co-host 50 Cutest Child Stars: All Grown Up on the E! network, along with Keshia Knight Pulliam of The Cosby Show fame.

In 2007, Bure guest-starred on the sitcom That's So Raven. The following year, she co-starred with Randy Travis in The Wager and starred with Tom Arnold in the television movie Moonlight and Mistletoe for the Hallmark Channel in 2008. Bure returned to television in 2009 and was cast in Make It or Break It, which ended in 2012.

On March 4, 2014, it was announced that Bure would compete on season 18 of Dancing with the Stars, partnering with Mark Ballas. The couple made it to the finals and ended in third place behind Meryl Davis and Amy Purdy who took first and second place, respectively.

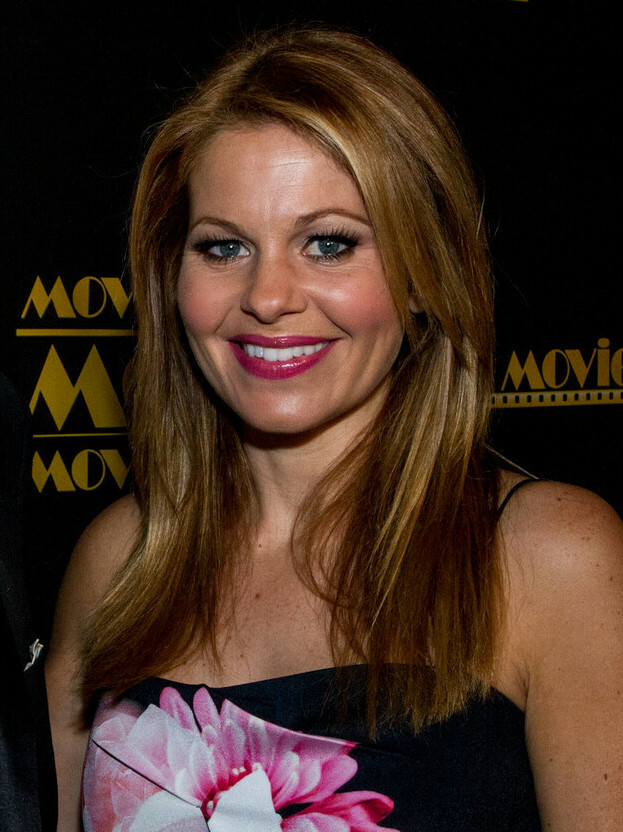
Bure at the Movieguide Awards in 2015

It was announced in 2015 that Bure would reprise her role as D. J. Tanner in the 2016 Netflix spinoff Fuller House, her character now going by D. J. Tanner-Fuller. Filming began in July 2015. Bure was a co-host of The View for seasons 19 and 20. In March 2016, Fuller House was picked up for a second season. On December 8, 2016, Bure announced that she was leaving The View due to commitment clashes between Fuller House and Hallmark Channel projects and family life. In January 2019, Fuller House was renewed for its fifth and final season to air later that year. The series concluded on June 2, 2020.

In July 2023, Fuller House actress Miss Benny indirectly accused Bure of attempting to remove Benny's character from the script of the show due to her character's queer identity. After facing online backlash, Bure denied the claims.

In 2025, Bure competed in season thirteen of The Masked Singer as "Cherry Blossom". As she was eliminated in the "Group C Premiere: Carnival Night", Bure stated that she did it in memory of Bob Saget where she recognized him as "Squiggly Monster" back in season four.

=== Hallmark Channel work ===
Bure has acted in over two dozen Hallmark Channel movies, including the 2017 Switched for Christmas, and as the titular character Aurora Teagarden in the eighteen-film Aurora Teagarden movie series for Hallmark Movies & Mysteries. Bure also produced and hosted the Hallmark Channel special Christmas in America. She also played in the 2015 special Christmas Detour. Bure served as the host of the 26th annual Movieguide Awards for the network on February 8, 2019, along with her daughter Natasha.

=== Great American Media ===
In April 2022, it was announced that Bure would take an executive role at GAC Media—a company led by former Hallmark Channel head Bill Abbott—to develop, produce, and star in original romantic comedy and holiday movies and series for GAC Family (now Great American Family) and GAC Living. Bure became chief content officer of the company.

In a November 2022 interview with The Wall Street Journal, Bure stated that she had left Hallmark because it was a "completely different network than when I started", and wanted to "tell stories that have more meaning and purpose and depth behind them"—including those with stronger faith-based themes (albeit not being "off-putting to the unbeliever or someone who shares a different faith"). Bure explained that Great American Media "wanted to promote faith programming and good family entertainment", and stated, "I think that Great American Family will keep traditional marriage at the core."

Bure's remarks were believed to be an allusion to a trend towards progressive themes, including recognition of the LGBT community, in Hallmark Channel productions. Abbott left Hallmark Channel in early 2020, shortly after it faced criticism for briefly pulling a Zola.com commercial depicting a lesbian couple. In response to criticism over the comments regarding "traditional" marriage by other celebrities such as Hilarie Burton and JoJo Siwa, Bure stated that people of various "identities" worked on Great American Media programming, and that "all of you who know me, know beyond question that I have great love and affection for all people." Of Bure's implication that Great American Media productions would never depict same-sex couples, Abbott stated to the Wall Street Journal, "It's certainly the year 2022, so we're aware of the trends. There's no whiteboard that says, 'Yes, this' or 'No, we'll never go here.'"

=== Books ===
Cameron Bure has written four books: A New York Times best seller, Reshaping It All: Motivation for Physical and Spiritual Fitness (ISBN 1433669730), published in January 2011; Balancing It All: My Story of Juggling Priorities and Purpose (ISBN 1433681846), published in January 2014; Dancing Through Life: Steps of Courage and Conviction (ISBN 1433686945), published in August 2015; and Kind Is the New Classy: The Power of Living Graciously (ISBN 0310350026), published in April 2018.

In a September 2015 interview, Bure revealed that Dancing Through Life discloses more personal issues than her first two books. In an April 2018 interview, Bure shared that Kind Is the New Classy conveyed the idea of staying centered and practicing graciousness towards others.

== Personal life ==
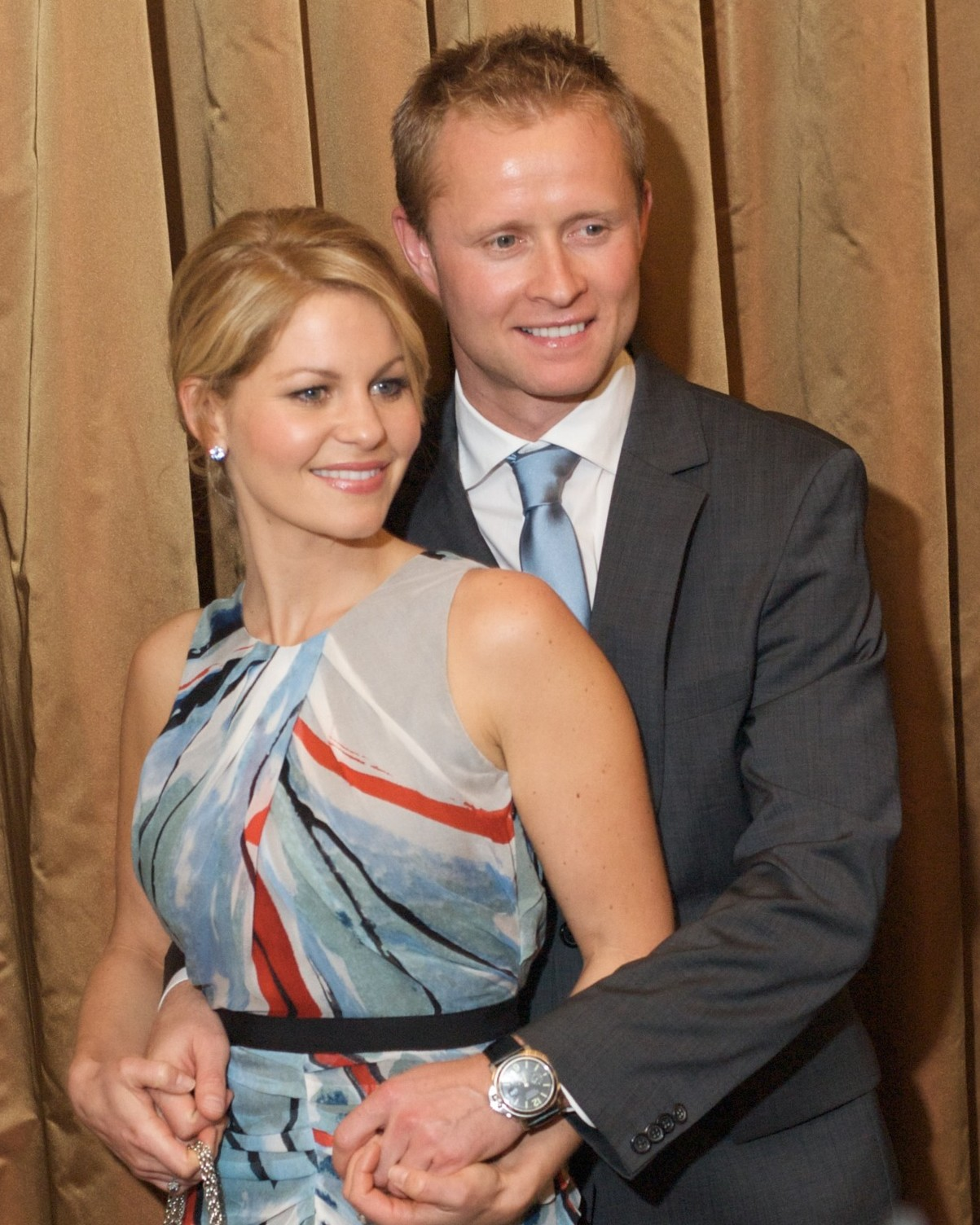
Bure and husband Valeri Bure in 2010

Bure married Russian-American NHL hockey player Valeri "Val" Bure on June 22, 1996. They were introduced at a charity hockey game by her Full House co-star Dave Coulier on August 18, 1994. They have three children, including Natasha, who is married to former child actor Bradley Steven Perry. She credits her Christian faith as being the binding force in her marriage. She and her husband reside in California.

Bure is a supporter of Compassion International, a Christian charity, and reportedly sponsored three children through the charity's humanitarian programs.

Bure is a conservative Republican. She became a Christian at the age of 12. Bure has said she opposes abortion. During the COVID-19 pandemic, she voiced opposition to vaccine mandates but clarified she was not anti-vaccine.

She was previously a member of Shepherd Church in Los Angeles before relocating to Napa.

In 2013, she revealed she suffered from bulimia nervosa in her early twenties.

== Filmography ==
=== Film ===
Year	Title	Role	Notes
1987	Some Kind of Wonderful	Cindy Nelson	Credited as Candace Cameron
1988	Punchline	Carrie	Credited as Candace Cameron
1995	Monster Mash	Mary	Credited as Candace Cameron
1996	No One Would Tell	Stacy Collins	
2001	The Krew	Chief Karls	
2007	The Wager	Cassandra	
2015	Faith of Our Fathers	Cynthia	
2018	F.R.E.D.I.	F.R.E.D.I. (voice)	
2024	Unsung Hero	Kay Albright	

=== Television ===
Year	Title	Role	Notes
1982–1984	St. Elsewhere	Megan White	Recurring role
1983	Alice	Child waiting in line for Santa	Episode: "Tis the Season to Be Jealous"
1984	T. J. Hooker	Tina	Episode: "The Confession"
1985	Punky Brewster	Julie Whitney / Jennifer Bates	Episode: "Milk Does a Body Good"
1986 & 1987	The Disney Sunday Movie	Julie / Samantha	Episodes: "Little Spies", "Bigfoot"
1987	Who's the Boss?	Young Mona	Episode: "Mona"
1987	Growing Pains	Jennifer "Jenny" Foster	Episode: "The Long Goodbye"
1987–1995	Full House	D. J. Tanner	Main role
1988	I Saw What You Did	Julia Fielding	Television film
1988	Growing Pains	Jenny Foster	Episode: "Fool for Love"
1990	The All New Mickey Mouse Club	D. J. Tanner	Episode: "Guest Day"
1990	Camp Cucamonga	Amber Lewis	Television film
1991	Nickelodeon Gets Real Mature	Herself	Television pilot
1994	Bill Nye The Science Guy	Herself	Episode: "Chemical Reactions"
1995	Sharon's Secret	Sharon Hartley	Television film
1995	Visitors of the Night	Katie English	Television film
1996	Cybill	Hannah	Episode: "When You're Hot, You're Hot"
1996	No One Would Tell	Stacy Collins	Television film
1996	Kidz in the Wood	Donna	Television film
1996	She Cried No	Melissa Connell	Television film
1997	NightScream	Drew Summers / Laura Fairgate	Television film
1997	Boy Meets World	Millie	Episode: "The Witches of Pennbrook"
2001	Twice in a Lifetime	Rose Hathaway	Episode: "Moonshine Over Harlem"
2007	That's So Raven	Courtney Dearborn	Episode: "Teacher's Pet"
2008	Moonlight and Mistletoe	Holly	Television film
2009–2012	Make It or Break It	Summer Van Horne	Main role
2011	Can't Get Arrested	Candace	Episode: "House of Pain"
2011	Truth Be Told	Annie Morgan	Television film
2011	The Heart of Christmas	Megan Walsh	Television film
2012	Puppy Love	Megan	Television film
2013	Finding Normal	Dr. Elizabeth "Lisa" Leland	Television film
2013	Let It Snow	Stephanie Beck	Television film
2014	Christmas Under Wraps	Dr. Lauren Brunell	Television film
2014	The Neighbors	Bella Bure	Episode: "There Goes the Neighbors' Hood"
2014	Dancing with the Stars	Herself	Contestant; finalist in season 18
2015–2022	Aurora Teagarden Mysteries	Aurora Teagarden	Main role; 18 films
2015	Just the Way You Are	Jennie Wreitz	Television film
2015	A Christmas Detour	Paige Summerlind	Television film
2015–2016	The View	Herself	Co-host
2016	Journey Back to Christmas	Hanna Norris	Television film
2016–2020	Fuller House	D. J. Tanner-Fuller	Main role; also director (3 episodes)
2017	Switched for Christmas	Kate/Chris	Television film
2018	A Shoe Addict's Christmas	Noelle Carpenter	Television film
2019	Christmas Town	Lauren Gabriel	Television film
2020	Nickelodeon's Unfiltered	Herself	Episode: "Zombies Eat Unicorns!"
2020	If I Only Had Christmas	Darcy	Television film
2021	The Christmas Contest	Lara	Television film
2022	A Christmas... Present	Maggie Larson	Television film
2022	Christmas on Candy Cane Lane	—N/a	Producer; Television film
2022	Reindeer in Here	Pinky (voice)	Television special
2023	My Christmas Hero	Nicole Ramsey	Television film
2024	Just in Time	—N/a	Producer; television film
2024	The Ainsley McGregor Mysteries: A Case for the Wine Maker	Ainsley McGregor	Television film
2024	A Christmas Less Traveled	Desi	Television film
2024	Home Sweet Christmas	Sophie Marlow	Television film
2025	The Ainsley McGregor Mysteries: A Case for the Yarn Maker	Ainsley McGregor	Television film
2025	The Masked Singer	Herself/Cherry Blossom	Season 13 contestant
2026	Special Forces: World's Toughest Test	Herself	Contestant; season 5

=== Music videos ===
- "Joy" (2018) by For King & Country, as News Anchor

== Awards and nominations ==
Year	Association	Category	Nominated work	Result
1988	Young Artist Awards	Outstanding Young Actors/Actresses Ensemble in Television or Motion Picture	Little Spies (shared with cast)	Nominated
1988	Young Artist Awards	Best Young Actress Guest Starring in a Television Comedy Series	Growing Pains (for episode "The Long Goodbye")	Nominated
1989	Young Artist Awards	Best Young Actress — Starring in a Television Comedy Series	Full House	Nominated
1990	Young Artist Awards	Best Young Actress Starring in a Television Series	Full House	Nominated
1991	Young Artist Awards	Best Young Actress Starring in a Television Series	Full House	Nominated
1992	Young Artist Awards	Best Young Actress Starring in a Television Series	Full House	Nominated
1993	Young Artist Awards	Best Young Actress Starring in a Television Series	Full House	Nominated
1994	Kids' Choice Awards	Favorite Television Actress	Full House	Won
2016	Daytime Emmy Awards	Outstanding Entertainment Talk Show Host (shared with Joy Behar, Michelle Collins, Paula Faris, Whoopi Goldberg, Rosie Perez, Raven-Symoné, and Nicolle Wallace)	The View	Nominated
2016	Teen Choice Awards	Choice TV Actress Comedy	Fuller House	Won
2016	Teen Choice Awards	Choice TV: Chemistry (with Jodie Sweetin & Andrea Barber)	Fuller House	Nominated
2017	Daytime Emmy Awards	Outstanding Entertainment Talk Show Host (shared with Joy Behar, Jedediah Bila, Paula Faris, Whoopi Goldberg, Sara Haines, Sunny Hostin, and Raven-Symoné)	The View	Nominated
2017	Teen Choice Awards	Choice TV Actress Comedy	Fuller House	Won
2018	Kids' Choice Awards	Favorite TV Actress	Fuller House	Nominated
2019	Kids' Choice Awards	Favorite Female TV Star	Fuller House	Nominated
2019	Teen Choice Awards	Choice TV Actress Comedy	Fuller House	Nominated
2020	Kids' Choice Awards	Favorite Female TV Star	Fuller House	Nominated
2021	Kids' Choice Awards	Favorite Female TV Star	Fuller House	Nominated

Media offices
Preceded by Rosie Perez; Nicolle Wallace	The View co-host 2015–2016	Succeeded by Meghan McCain
