= Daytime Emmy Awards =

American TV award

Daytime Emmy Award
- Previous: 52nd Daytime Emmy Awards; October 17, 2025; Next: 53rd Daytime Emmy Awards; October 30, 2026
- Awarded for: Excellence in daytime television
- Country: United States
- Presented by: NATAS/ATAS
- First award: May 21, 1974; 52 years ago
- Website: theemmys.tv/daytime/

The Daytime Emmy Awards, or Daytime Emmys, are part of the extensive range of Emmy Awards for artistic and technical merit for the American television industry. Bestowed by the New York-based National Academy of Television Arts and Sciences (NATAS), the Daytime Emmys are presented in recognition of excellence in American daytime television programming. The first ceremony was held in 1974, expanding what was originally a prime time–themed Emmy Award. Ceremonies generally were held in May or June, but starting in 2025 the ceremony was held in October.

== History ==
The first Emmy Award ceremony took place on January 25, 1949. The first daytime-themed Emmy Awards were given out at the Primetime Emmy Awards ceremony in 1972, when The Doctors and General Hospital were nominated for Outstanding Achievement in a Daytime Drama. That year, The Doctors won the first Best Show Daytime Emmy. In addition, the award for Outstanding Achievement by an Individual in a Daytime Drama was given to Mary Fickett from All My Children. A previous category "Outstanding Achievement in Daytime Programming" was added once in 1968 with individuals like Days of Our Lives star Macdonald Carey nominated. Due to voting rules of the time, judges could opt to either award one or no Emmy, and in the end they decided that no one nominated was deserving of the golden statuette. This snub outraged then-Another World writer Agnes Nixon, causing her to write in The New York Times, "...after viewing the recent fiasco of the Emmy awards, it may well be considered a mark of distinction to have been ignored by this group."

Longtime General Hospital star John Beradino became a leading voice to have daytime talent honored with special recognition for their work. The first separate awards show made just for daytime programming was broadcast in 1974 from the Channel Gardens at Rockefeller Center in New York. The hosts that year were Barbara Walters and Peter Marshall. For years, the gala was held in New York, usually at nearby Radio City Music Hall, with occasional broadcasts from Madison Square Garden. In 2006, the Daytime Emmys was moved to the Kodak Theatre in Los Angeles, the first time they had ever been held outside of New York. The Kodak Theatre also hosted the 2007 and 2008 ceremonies, before it was moved again in 2009 to the Orpheum Theatre across town. In 2010 and 2011, the Daytime Emmys were instead held in Las Vegas. From 2012 onward, the Daytime Emmys have been held at various venues in Los Angeles, never to return again to New York (most likely as a reflection of the current state of American daytime dramas, where all New York-produced network soap operas have since been cancelled, and the ones left on the air are being recorded in Los Angeles).

In 2007, child voice actress Danica Lee, the voice for Ming-Ming in Wonder Pets! became the first Asian nominee overall in Daytime Emmy history while Eric Bauza became the first adult Asian nominee in Daytime Emmy history.

Due to the relatively small talent pool in daytime television, it has become common for the same people to be nominated repeatedly. The most infamous of these is All My Children star Susan Lucci, whose name became synonymous with being nominated for an award and never winning, after having been nominated 18 times without receiving an award before finally winning a Daytime Emmy for Best Actress in 1999.

In 2003, in response to heavy criticism of bloc voting in favor of shows with the largest casts, an additional voting round was added to all the drama acting categories. Known as the "pre-nominations", one or two actors from each show is selected to then move on and be considered for the primary nominations for the awards.

With the rise of cable television in the 1980s, cable programs first became eligible for the Daytime Emmys in 1989. In 2013, in response to All My Children being moved from broadcast to streaming television, NATAS began accepting nominations to web-only series. The Academy of Television Arts & Sciences (ATAS) also began accepting original online-only streaming television programs in 2013.

In October 2019, as part of several initiatives regarding gender identity, the NATAS decided to replace both the younger actor and actress in a drama categories with a single gender-neutral one for 2020.

The 47th Daytime Emmy Awards were postponed to June 26, 2020, due to the COVID-19 pandemic, with the traditional in-person ceremony being replaced by a television special featuring remote appearances, and the announcement of winners in leading categories.

In December 2021, the ATAS and NATAS announced major realignments to the Emmy Awards, accounting for the growth of streaming services by aligning their categories and the ceremonies' scopes around factors such as the themes and frequency of such programming, rather than dayparts. This resulted in most dramas (besides soap operas) now falling exclusively under the scope of the Primetime Emmy Awards, and categories for children's television being spun out into the newly established Children's and Family Emmy Awards.

NATAS has periodically awarded the Chairman's Crystal Pillar Award, for special achievement in daytime television, including a 2011 award for Oprah Winfrey and her eponymous syndicated talk show. In 2021, the Crystal Pillar was awarded to 16 daytime television professionals who "envisioned and implemented procedures that made safe production of media possible during the COVID pandemic" as part of the 48th Daytime Creative Arts Emmy Awards.

In January 2025, NATAS president Adam Sharp stated that beginning with the 52nd ceremony, the Daytime Emmy Awards would move from its previous May/June scheduling to October, switching places with the News and Documentary Emmy Awards to highlight the "timely nature" of news and documentary content.

== Rules ==
Among the Daytime Emmy rules, a show must originally air on American television during the eligibility period between January 1 and December 31. Historically, in order to be considered a national daytime show, the program was required to air between 2 a.m. and 6 p.m., and to at least 50 percent of the country. Shows in syndication, whose air times vary between media markets, could either be entered in the Daytime or Primetime Emmys (provided they still reach the 50 percent national reach), but not in both. Game shows that reached the 50 percent threshold could be entered into the Daytime Emmys if they normally aired before 8 p.m.; otherwise, they were only eligible for the Primetime Emmys.

Web television shows must be available for downloading or streaming to more than 50 percent of the country, and like shows in syndication they can only enter in one of the national Emmy competitions. A show that enters into the Daytime Emmys cannot also be entered into the Primetime Emmy Awards or any other national Emmy competition. Entries must be submitted by late December. Most award categories also require entries to include DVDs or tape masters of the show. For example, most series categories require the submitted DVD to include any one or two episodes that originally aired during the eligibility period.

Voting is done by peer judging panels. Any active Academy member who has national credits for at least two years and within the last five years is eligible to be a judge. Depending on the category, voting is done using either a ratings score criteria or a preferential scoring system.

As of the 49th edition, eligibility for the Daytime Emmy Awards is now based on factors such as thematics and broadcasting frequency, with certain categories having been moved to other Emmy presentations. In particular:

- Only daytime serial dramas—defined as an episodic, multi-camera drama that airs on a weekday basis, or a reboot or spin-off of such a series—are eligible for drama awards at the Daytime Emmy Awards. All other scripted comedies and dramas now fall under the ATAS and Primetime Emmy Awards, regardless of scheduling.
- Programming targeting viewers aged 15 and younger were spun out into the new Children's and Family Emmy Awards, also organized by the NATAS.
- Talk shows are divided between the Daytime and Primetime Emmy Awards based on "format and style characteristics reflective of current programming in the daytime or late night space".
- Categories for morning shows were moved to the News & Documentary Emmy Awards.
- Categories for game shows and instructional/do it yourself (DIY) programming remained split between the Daytime and Primetime Emmy Awards for 2022. Most game show categories were then moved to the Primetime Emmys in 2023, while those game shows featuring children as contestants were moved to the Children's and Family Emmys.

== Telecast ==
The show originally aired during the daytime hours (except for the 1983 and 1984 awards, which weren't televised) but moved to primetime in 1991. For many years, the show was produced by one of its own Lifetime Achievement honorees, Dick Clark. Each show from 2006 to 2008 was produced by White Cherry Entertainment.

NBC often aired special primetime episodes of its soaps (such as Another World: Summer Desire) as a lead-in to the ceremony. In 2002, 2005, and 2007, CBS aired special primetime editions of The Price Is Right as a lead-in (the first of which tying into its then-host Bob Barker being host of the ceremony, and the last being a primetime encore of his final episode as host, which aired earlier in the day).

In August 2009, The CW broadcast the Daytime Emmys for the first time, due to the other networks declining to carry it (at the time the network did have one daytime program, Judge Jeanine Pirro). The airing delivered the ceremony's lowest ratings ever (0.6/2 in 18–49, 2.72m), but it did outperform The CW's weak averages on the night that summer. The second time around, Associated Television International brought the 37th Daytime Emmy Awards to CBS, as well as the 38th, the following year. On May 3, 2012, it was announced and confirmed that HLN would air the 39th ceremony on June 23, 2012. In that ceremony, an additional non-Emmy award was awarded by the program's social media partner, AOL, for Best Viral Video Series. With 912,000 viewers (not counting four repeat broadcasts which brought the total to 2 million), the broadcast was "the most watched regularly scheduled, non-news telecast" ever on HLN, but by far the least-watched Daytime Emmy ceremony ever.

For the first time in the event's four-decade history, the 2014 Daytime Emmy ceremony was not broadcast on TV and instead aired only online via a dedicated NATAS website, DaytimeEmmys.net, but the Daytime Awards telecast eventually returned to television the following year thanks to a two-year deal with basic cable channel Pop. However, for 2016, the academy announced that ceremony would not be televised for the second time, citing the "current climate for awards shows".

In 2020, the remotely-produced "virtual" ceremony for the 47th Daytime Emmy Awards due to the COVID-19 pandemic aired on CBS, marking its return to both broadcast TV and CBS for the first time since 2011. On April 1, 2021, the NATAS subsequently announced a two-year deal with CBS, covering the 48th and 49th Daytime Emmy Awards. CBS then renewed for another two years through 2024. However, the ceremonies returned to NATAS's internet platforms in 2025.

== Award categories ==
=== Daytime Emmys ===
Daytime Emmys are awarded in the following categories:

Programming

- Outstanding Drama Series
- Outstanding Daytime Talk Series (Note: Between 2008 and 2022, was split into separate Talk Show–Entertainment and Talk Show–Informative awards.)
- Outstanding Legal/Courtroom Program
- Outstanding Culinary Program
- Outstanding Entertainment News Program

Acting

- Outstanding Lead Actor in a Drama Series
- Outstanding Lead Actress in a Drama Series
- Outstanding Supporting Actor in a Drama Series
- Outstanding Supporting Actress in a Drama Series
- Outstanding Guest Performer in a Drama Series
- Outstanding Emerging Talent in a Daytime Drama Series

Hosting

- Outstanding Talk Show Host (Note: Between 2015 and 2022, was split into separate Entertainment Talk Show Host and Informative Talk Show Host awards.)
- Outstanding Culinary Host

Writing/Directing

- Directing for a Drama Series
- Writing for a Drama Series

=== Daytime Creative Arts Emmys ===
Creative Arts Emmy Awards are awarded in the following categories:

Art Direction

- Art Direction/Set Decoration/Scenic Design

Casting

- Casting

Costumes

- Costume Design/Styling

Directing

- Directing in a Lifestyle/Culinary/Travel Program
- Directing in a Talk Show/Morning Program
- Special Class Directing

Editing

- Multiple Camera Editing for a Drama Series
- Multiple Camera Editing for a Series
- Single Camera Editing for a Series

Hairstyling

- Hairstyling for a Drama Series
- Hairstyling for a Series

Lighting Direction

- Lighting Direction for a Drama Series
- Lighting Direction for a Series

Main Title and Graphic Design

Makeup

- Makeup

Music

- Music Direction and Composition

Performance

- Host in a Lifestyle/Culinary Program

Programming

- Outstanding Lifestyle Program
- Outstanding Special Class Series
- Outstanding Special Class Special
- Outstanding Special Class – Short Format Daytime Program
- Outstanding Travel Program

Promotional Announcement

- Promotional Announcement – Episodic
- Promotional Announcement – Institutional

Sound Editing and Mixing

- Live and Direct to Tape Sound Mixing
- Sound Mixing and Sound Editing

Stunt Coordination

Technical Direction

- Single Camera Photography
- Technical Team

Writing

- Special Class Writing

=== Retired categories ===
Programming

- Outstanding Children/Youth/Family Special (1974–2007)
- Outstanding Children's Animated Program (Note: Replaced in 2022 by similar category(ies) in the Children's & Family Emmy Awards.)
- Outstanding Pre-School Children's Animated Program
- Outstanding Children's Series
- Outstanding Pre-School Children's Series
- Outstanding Special Class Animated Program
- Outstanding Digital Daytime Drama Series (2011–2021) (Note: Replaced in 2022 by similar category(ies) in the Primetime Emmy Awards.)
- Outstanding Game Show (1974–2022) (Note: Moved in 2023 to the Primetime Emmy Awards.)
- Outstanding Morning Program (2007–2021) (Note: Replaced in 2022 by similar category(ies) in the News & Documentary Emmy Awards.)

Acting

- Outstanding Younger Actor in a Drama Series (1985–2019) (Note: Replaced in 2020 by the gender-neutral Younger Performer category.)
- Outstanding Younger Actress in a Drama Series (1985–2019)
- Outstanding Younger Performer in a Drama Series (2020–2023)

Art Direction

Hosting

- Outstanding Game Show Host (1974–2022)

Casting

- Casting for an Animated Series or Special
- Casting for a Children's Program
- Casting for a Drama or Daytime Fiction program

Costumes

- Costume Design for a Drama Series

Directing

- Directing in an Animated Program
- Directing in a Preschool Animated Program
- Directing in a Children's Series
- Directing Team for a Daytime Fiction Program
- Voice Directing for a Daytime Animated Series
- Directing in a Game/Audience Participation Show (removed in 2006)
- Directing in a Game Show (2015–2020)

Editing

- Editing for an Animated Program
- Editing for a Preschool Animated Program

Individual Achievement in Animation

Art Direction

- Art Direction/Set Direction/Scenic Design for a Drama or Daytime Fiction Program

Lighting Direction

- Lighting Direction for a Drama Series

Music

- Music Direction and Composition for a Preschool, Children's or Animated Program
- Original Song in a Children's, Young Adult or Animated Program
- Original Song for a Preschool, Children's or Animated Program
- Outstanding Original Song
- Music Direction and Composition for a Drama Series
- Original Song – Drama
- Original Song for a Series
- Original Song – Main Title and Promo
- Music Direction and Composition for a Drama Series

New Approaches

- New Approaches – Enhancement to a Daytime Program or Series
- New Approaches – Original Daytime Program or Series

Performance

- Performer in a Children/Youth/Family Special (1989–2007)
- Outstanding Musical Performance in a Daytime Program (2016–2019)
- Performer in an Animated Program
- Performer in a Preschool Animated Program
- Performer in a Children's Series
- Younger Performer in a Children's Program

Sound Editing and Mixing

- Film Sound Editing (1985–1995)
- Film Sound Mixing (1985–1995)
- Sound Editing (1996–2002)
- Sound Mixing (1996–2002)
- Sound Editing – Special Class (1996–2002)
- Sound Mixing – Special Class (1996–2002)
- Sound Editing – Live Action or Animation (2003–2011)
- Sound Mixing – Live Action or Animation (2003–2011)
- Sound Mixing and Sound Editing for an Animated Program
- Sound Mixing and Sound Editing for a Preschool Animated Program
- Sound Editing – Animation
- Sound Editing for a Preschool Animated Program
- Sound Mixing – Animation
- Sound Mixing for a Preschool Animated Program
- Sound Editing – Live Action
- Sound Mixing – Live Action
- Sound Mixing and Editing for a Drama or Daytime Fiction Program
- Live and Direct to Tape Sound Mixing for a Drama Series

Technical Direction

- Technical Team for a Drama Series

Writing

- Writing in an Animated Program (1992–1994, 2009–2021)
- Writing in a Children's Series
- Writing in a Preschool Animated Program

Spanish programming/talent

- Outstanding Morning Program in Spanish (Note: In 2022, non-English programs became eligible in the existing award categories.)
- Outstanding Entertainment Program in Spanish
- Outstanding Daytime Talent in Spanish

== Ratings ==
No.	Air date	Network	Household rating	Viewers (millions)
18th	June 27, 1991	CBS	13.5	18.9
19th	June 23, 1992	NBC	15.3	20.2
20th	May 26, 1993	ABC	16.4	22
21st	May 25, 1994	ABC	14.1	18.9
22nd	May 19, 1995	NBC	10.2	13.7
23rd	May 22, 1996	CBS	11.4	15.1
24th	May 21, 1997	ABC	11.8	15.9
25th	May 15, 1998	NBC	10.2	13
26th	May 21, 1999	CBS	10.4	14.2
27th	May 19, 2000	ABC	9.1	13
28th	May 18, 2001	NBC	7.9	10.3
29th	May 17, 2002	CBS	6.9	10.1
30th	May 16, 2003	ABC	6.3	8.6
31st	May 21, 2004	NBC	6	8.4
32nd	May 20, 2005	CBS	5.5	7.6
33rd	April 28, 2006	ABC	4.5	6.1
34th	June 15, 2007	CBS	5.9	8.3
35th	June 20, 2008	ABC	4	5.4
36th	August 30, 2009	The CW	2	2.7
37th	June 27, 2010	CBS	3.8	5.6
38th	June 19, 2011	CBS	3.7	5.5
39th	June 23, 2012	HLN	N/A	2 (cumulative of original show and 4 same-night reruns)
40th	June 16, 2013	HLN	N/A	1.8
41st	June 22, 2014	(Internet Broadcast)	N/A	N/A
42nd	April 26, 2015	Pop	N/A	9
43rd	May 1, 2016	YouTube, Facebook, Periscope	N/A	0.298
44th	April 30, 2017	YouTube, Facebook, Periscope	N/A	0.295
45th	April 29, 2018	YouTube, Facebook, Periscope, KNEKT-TV	N/A	0.426
46th	May 5, 2019	YouTube, Facebook, KNEKT-TV	N/A	0.143
47th	June 26, 2020	CBS	0.3	3.1
48th	June 25, 2021	CBS	0.2	2.4
49th	June 24, 2022	CBS	0.2	2.9
50th	December 15, 2023	CBS	1.43	2.12
51st	June 7, 2024	CBS	1.87	2.917

== See also ==
- List of American television awards
- List of Daytime Emmy Award winners in acting and drama
- List of Primetime Emmy Award winners
- Primetime Emmy Award § Retired categories
