= The Real (talk show) =

American syndicated talk show (2013–2022)

- Genre: Talk show
- Created by: SallyAnn Salsano
- Directed by: Don Frillici
- Presented by: Adrienne Bailon; Tamar Braxton; Loni Love; Jeannie Mai; Tamera Mowry; Amanda Seales; Garcelle Beauvais
- Opening theme: "This is Our Time" by Tamille Doswell
- Country of origin: United States
- Original language: English
- No. of seasons: 8
- No. of episodes: 1,360

Production
- Executive producers: SallyAnn Salsano (2013–2016); Rachel Miskowiec (2015–2021); Tenia L. Watson (2021–2022)
- Producers: Adrienne Bailon; Loni Love; Jeannie Mai; Garcelle Beauvais
- Production location: Burbank, California
- Camera setup: Multi-camera
- Running time: 43 minutes (approx.)
- Production companies: 495 Productions (2013–2015); Telepictures Productions; Warner Bros. Domestic Television Distribution

Original release
- Network: Syndication
- Release: July 15, 2013 – June 3, 2022

The Real is an American syndicated talk show created by SallyAnn Salsano (495 Productions). The series initially received a trial run on Fox-owned markets in the summer of 2013 and premiered for full syndication in 2014. It was last co-hosted by singer and actress Adrienne Bailon, comedian and actress Loni Love, television host and fashion stylist Jeannie Mai, and actress and model Garcelle Beauvais. It was cancelled in 2022.

== Production ==
In the summer of 2013, it was announced that the series would be tested on seven Fox-owned stations in New York, Los Angeles, Washington, D.C., Philadelphia, Phoenix, Houston and Tampa. In October 2013, it was announced that The Real would be nationally syndicated beginning September 15, 2014.

In February 2015, Warner Bros. announced the series had been renewed for a second season. In October 2015, the series was renewed for a third and fourth season, allowing it to air through 2018. The program switched to broadcasting live in its fourth season, allowing viewers "a seat at the table" starting September 2017.

In January 2018, the series was renewed for a fifth and sixth season. In November 2019, the series was renewed for a seventh and eighth season through the 2021–2022 television season.

SallyAnn Salsano, who created the show, was executive producer along with Rachel Miskowiec until 2015, when Miskowiec took over; In August 2021, Tenia Watson was announced as the new executive producer for the eighth season. The show is produced by 495 Productions and Telepictures Productions and distributed by Warner Bros. Domestic Television Distribution.

On April 8, 2022, it was reported that The Real had been cancelled and the eighth season would be its last. Production costs due to COVID-19 have been attributed to the show's cancellation. The final episode aired on June 3. Reruns from the final season of The Real aired until September 2.

== Co-hosts ==
The original panel of The Real comprised five co-hosts: actress Tamera Mowry, television host Jeannie Mai, singer and television personality Tamar Braxton, actress and singer Adrienne Bailon and comedian and actress Loni Love. Braxton departed on May 22, 2016. Throughout 2019, actress and comedian Amanda Seales served as a frequent guest co-host. In January 2020, Seales became a permanent co-host during the series' sixth season. The following June, Seales exited the series, citing her dissatisfaction with the inability to openly speak on recent social issues as a reason, along with a lack of minority executive staff within Telepictures. The following month, Mowry-Housley announced her departure. In August, actress Garcelle Beauvais was announced as a permanent addition to the panel for season 7.

== Notable episodes ==
The Real celebrated its 100th episode on February 24, 2015. In January 2016, the co-hosts traveled to Washington, D.C. to visit The White House and First Lady Michelle Obama. In addition to granting an interview, The First Lady and the co-hosts spoke to high schoolers about college. On April 30, 2018, The Real held a celebratory episode following their win at the 45th Daytime Emmy Awards one day before. The series celebrated the airing of its 1,000th episode on February 17, 2020.

== Awards and nominations ==
Awards and nominations for The Real
Year	Award	Category	Nominee(s)	Result	Ref.
2015	42nd Daytime Emmy Awards	Outstanding Hairstyling	Robbi Rogers, Kya Bilal, Alyson Black-Barrie, Ray Dodson, Adriana Tesler, Noogie Thai	Nominated	
2015	42nd Daytime Emmy Awards	Outstanding Makeup	Sarah Hall, Pamela Farmer, Motoko Honjo, Hyun-Jung Kim, Uzmee Krakovszki, Terrell Mullin	Nominated	
2016	43rd Daytime Emmy Awards				
2016	43rd Daytime Emmy Awards	Outstanding Talk Show / Entertainment	The Real	Nominated	
2016	43rd Daytime Emmy Awards	Outstanding Entertainment Talk Show Host	Bailon, Braxton, Love, Mai, Mowry-Housley	Nominated	
2016	43rd Daytime Emmy Awards	Outstanding Hairstyling	Roberta Rogers-Windley, Ray D, James Davis, Jeuge Master Karim, Noogie Thai	Nominated	
2016	43rd Daytime Emmy Awards	Outstanding Makeup	Melanie Mills, Glen Alen Gutierrez, Motoko Honjo-Clayton, Eva Kim, Uzmee Krakovski, Keesh Winkler-Smith	Nominated	
2017	48th NAACP Image Awards	Outstanding Talk Series	The Real	Nominated	
2017	44th Daytime Emmy Awards	Outstanding Entertainment Talk Show Host	Braxton, Houghton, Love, Mai, Mowry-Housley	Nominated	
2018	49th NAACP Image Awards	Outstanding Talk Series	The Real	Won	
2018	45th Daytime Emmy Awards	Outstanding Entertainment Talk Show	The Real	Nominated	
2018	45th Daytime Emmy Awards	Outstanding Entertainment Talk Show Host	Houghton, Love, Mai, Mowry-Housley	Won	
2018	45th Daytime Emmy Awards	Outstanding Directing in a Talk Show/Entertainment News/Morning Program	The Real	Nominated	
2018	44th People's Choice Awards	The Daytime Talk Show of 2018	The Real	Nominated	
2019	50th NAACP Image Awards	Outstanding Talk Series	The Real	Won	
2019	46th Daytime Emmy Awards	Outstanding Entertainment Talk Show	The Real	Nominated	
2019	46th Daytime Emmy Awards	Outstanding Entertainment Talk Show Host	Houghton, Love, Mai, Mowry-Housley	Nominated	
2019	46th Daytime Emmy Awards	Outstanding Directing in a Talk Show/Entertainment News/Morning Program	The Real	Nominated	
2019	46th Daytime Emmy Awards	Outstanding Musical Performance in a Daytime Program	Houghton and Israel Houghton for "Secrets"	Nominated	
2019	46th Daytime Emmy Awards	Outstanding Hairstyling	The Real	Nominated	
2019	45th People's Choice Awards	The Daytime Talk Show of 2019	The Real	Nominated	
2020	51st NAACP Image Awards	Outstanding Talk Series	The Real	Nominated	
2020	47th Daytime Emmy Awards	Outstanding Costume Design/Styling	The Real	Won	
2020	47th Daytime Emmy Awards	Outstanding Hairstyling	The Real	Won	
2020	47th Daytime Emmy Awards	Outstanding Makeup	The Real	Nominated	
2021	Make-Up Artists & Hair Stylists Guild Awards	Best Make-Up, Daytime Television	Melanie Mills, Glen Alen Gutierrez, Motoko Honjo Clayton	Nominated	
2021	Make-Up Artists & Hair Stylists Guild Awards	Best Hair Styling, Daytime Television	Roberta Gardener-Rogers, Rachel Mason, Ray Dobson, Noogie Thai	Nominated	
2021	48th Daytime Emmy Awards	Outstanding Hairstyling	The Real	Won	
2021	48th Daytime Emmy Awards	Outstanding Makeup	The Real	Won	
2022			The Real		
2022	49th Daytime Emmy Awards	Outstanding Hairstyling	The Real	Nominated	
2022	49th Daytime Emmy Awards	Outstanding Makeup	The Real	Won	
2022	53rd NAACP Image Awards	Outstanding Talk Series	The Real	Nominated	
2022	53rd NAACP Image Awards	Outstanding Host in a Talk or News / Information (Series or Special)	Garcelle Beauvais, Adrienne Bailon, Loni Love, Jeannie Mai	Nominated	
