= Daytime Emmy Award for Outstanding Morning Program =

Television award category

- Awarded for: Outstanding Morning Program
- Country: United States
- Presented by: Academy of Television Arts & Sciences
- First award: 2007
- Final award: 2021

Highlights
- Most awards: Good Morning America (6)
- Most nominations: Good Morning America (15); The Today Show (15)
- Website: emmyonline.org

The Daytime Emmy Award for Outstanding Morning Program had been awarded every year between 2007 and 2021. Beginning in 2020, the category name was changed from Outstanding Morning Program to Outstanding Morning Show. In December 2021, it was announced that this Daytime Emmy category will be retired and all morning shows will now be honored at the separate News & Documentary Emmy Awards.

== Winners and nominees ==
=== 2000s ===
Year	Program	Network	Ref
2007 (34th)
2007 (34th)	Good Morning America (tie)	ABC	
2007 (34th)	The Today Show (tie)	NBC	
2007 (34th)	Live with Regis and Kelly	Syndicated	
2008 (35th)
2008 (35th)	Good Morning America	ABC	
2008 (35th)	American Morning	CNN	
2008 (35th)	The Today Show	NBC	
2009 (36th)
2009 (36th)	Good Morning America	ABC	
2009 (36th)	The Early Show	CBS	
2009 (36th)	The Today Show	NBC	

=== 2010s ===
Year	Program	Network	Ref
2010 (37th)
2010 (37th)	The Today Show	NBC	
2010 (37th)	Good Morning America	ABC	
2010 (37th)	American Morning	CNN	
2011 (38th)
2011 (38th)	The Today Show	NBC	
2011 (38th)	Good Morning America	ABC	
2012 (39th)
2012 (39th)	The Today Show	NBC	
2012 (39th)	Good Morning America	ABC	
2013 (40th)
2013 (40th)	CBS Sunday Morning	CBS	
2013 (40th)	Good Morning America	ABC	
2013 (40th)	The Today Show	NBC	
2014 (41st)
2014 (41st)	Good Morning America	ABC	
2014 (41st)	CBS Sunday Morning	CBS	
2014 (41st)	CBS This Morning	CBS	
2014 (41st)	The Today Show	NBC	
2015 (42nd)
2015 (42nd)	CBS Sunday Morning	CBS	
2015 (42nd)	Good Morning America	ABC	
2015 (42nd)	The Today Show	NBC	
2016 (43rd)
2016 (43rd)	CBS Sunday Morning	CBS	
2016 (43rd)	CBS This Morning	CBS	
2016 (43rd)	Good Morning America	ABC	
2016 (43rd)	The Today Show	NBC	
2017 (44th)
2017 (44th)	Good Morning America	ABC	
2017 (44th)	CBS Sunday Morning	CBS	
2017 (44th)	CBS This Morning	CBS	
2017 (44th)	The Today Show	NBC	
2018 (45th)
2018 (45th)	Good Morning America	ABC	
2018 (45th)	CBS Sunday Morning	CBS	
2018 (45th)	CBS This Morning	CBS	
2018 (45th)	The Today Show	NBC	
2019 (46th)
2019 (46th)	CBS Sunday Morning	CBS	
2019 (46th)	CBS This Morning	CBS	
2019 (46th)	Good Morning America	ABC	
2019 (46th)	The Today Show	NBC	

=== 2020s ===
Year	Program	Network	Ref
2020 (47th)
2020 (47th)	Today	NBC	
2020 (47th)	CBS Sunday Morning	CBS	
2020 (47th)	CBS This Morning	CBS	
2020 (47th)	Good Morning America	ABC	
2020 (47th)	Sunday Today with Willie Geist	NBC	
2021 (48th)
2021 (48th)	CBS Sunday Morning	CBS	
2021 (48th)	Good Morning America	ABC	
2021 (48th)	Sunday Today with Willie Geist	ABC	
2021 (48th)	Today	NBC	

== Multiple wins ==
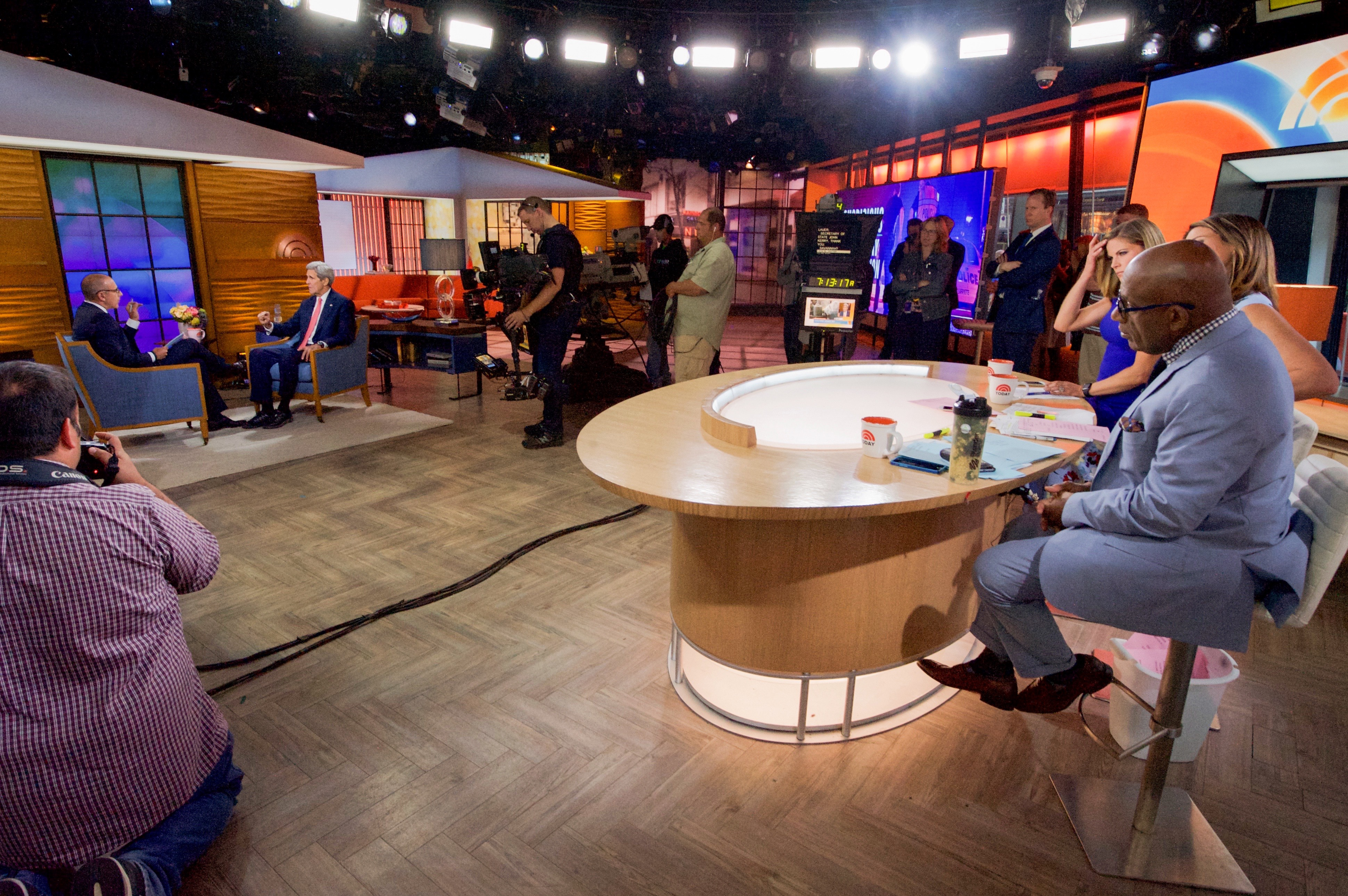
The Today Show won the first award in a 2007 tie with Good Morning America.

6 wins

- Good Morning America

5 wins

- CBS Sunday Morning
- The Today Show

== Multiple nominations ==
15 nominations

- Good Morning America
- The Today Show

9 nominations

- CBS Sunday Morning

6 nominations

- CBS This Morning

2 nominations

- American Morning
- Sunday Today with Willie Geist
