= 43rd Daytime Emmy Awards =

- Promotional advertisement
- Awarded for: Outstanding achievement in all fields of daytime television
- Date: May 1, 2016
- Location: Westin Bonaventure Hotel; Los Angeles, California, U.S.
- Presented by: National Academy of Television Arts and Sciences

Highlights
- Outstanding Drama Series: General Hospital
- Outstanding Game Show: The Price Is Right
- Website: emmyonline.org

Television/radio coverage
- Produced by: Mike Rothman

The 43rd Daytime Emmy Awards, presented by the National Academy of Television Arts and Sciences (NATAS), "recognizes outstanding achievement in all fields of daytime television production and are presented to individuals and programs broadcast from 2:00 a.m. to 6:00 p.m. during the 2015 calendar year". The ceremony took place on May 1, 2016, at the Westin Bonaventure Hotel and Suites in Los Angeles, California.

The drama pre-nominees were announced on January 27, 2016, and the standard nominations were announced on March 24, 2016, during an episode of The Talk for a second year in a row. The 43rd Daytime Creative Arts Emmy Awards ceremony, for extended Daytime Emmy categories, was held on April 29, 2016, with the venue also being the Westin Bonaventure Hotel. On March 24, 2016, the NATAS announced that despite the success of the previous year's ceremony on Pop, that the 2016 ceremony will forgo a traditional television broadcast for the second time citing "the current climate for awards shows". The 2014 ceremony also forwent a traditional television broadcast due to a lack of a suitable broadcast partner in time for the ceremony. On April 6, 2016, it was announced that the Lifetime Achievement Award would be presented to Sonia Manzano.

== Submission change ==
In addition to multiple changes for Creative Arts categories, the Academy announced a submission change for the 43rd Daytime Emmy Awards. For the Blue Ribbon Judging round, performers from the six Drama performer categories can now submit up to 20 minutes of appearances from any two episodes from the 2015 calendar year, rather than from one single episode as had been done for several previous years. Thirty-minute programs have the option of using material from up to four episodes, specifically from two sets of two consecutive episodes.

== Winners and nominees ==
Winners are listed first, highlighted in boldface, and indicated with a double dagger.

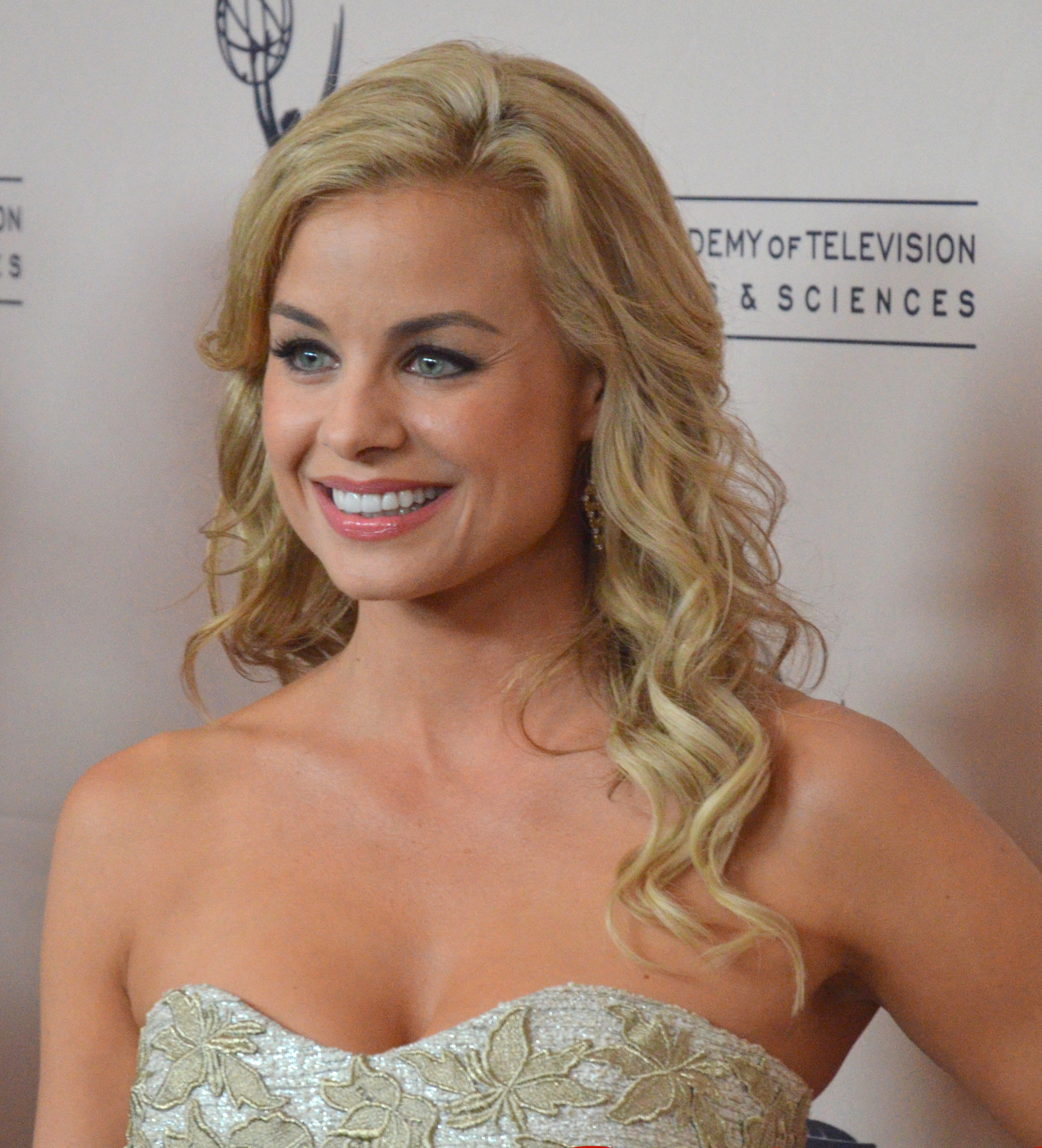
Jessica Collins, Outstanding Supporting Actress in a Drama Series winner

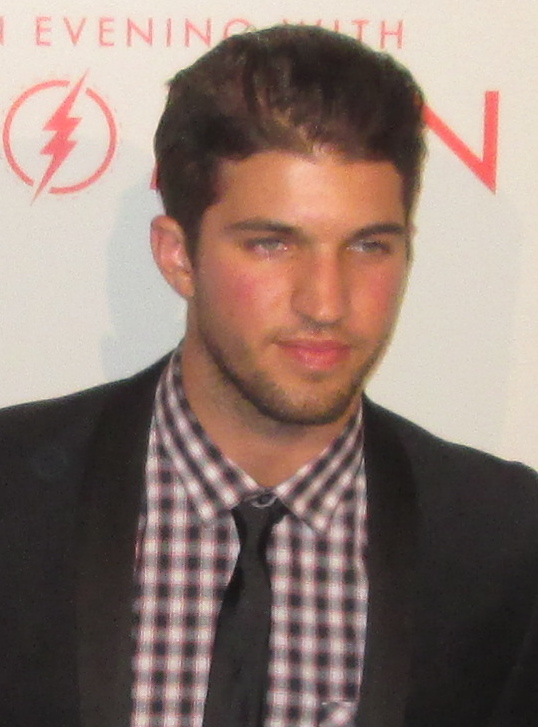
Bryan Craig, Outstanding Younger Actor in a Drama Series winner

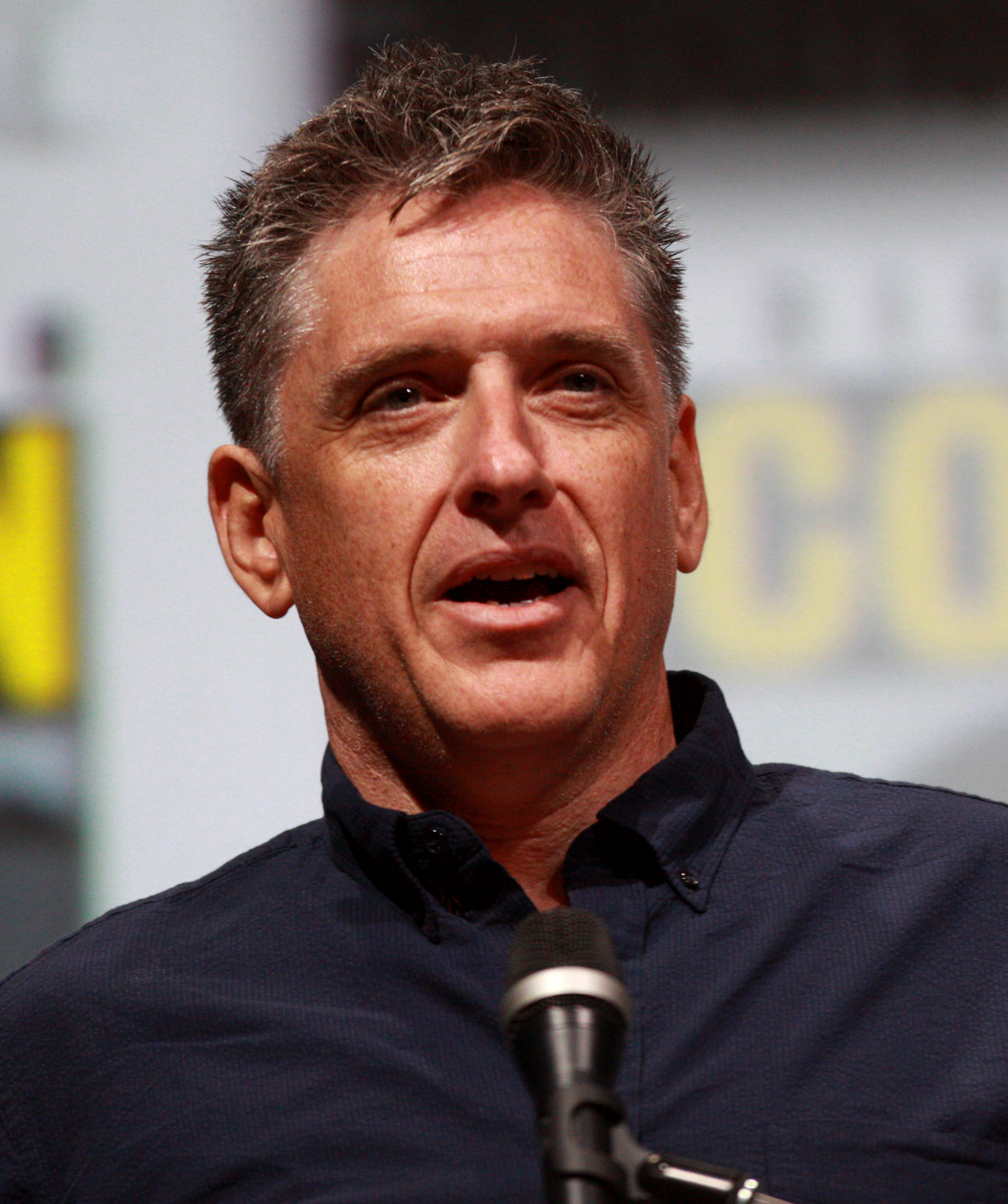
Craig Ferguson, Outstanding Game Show Host winner

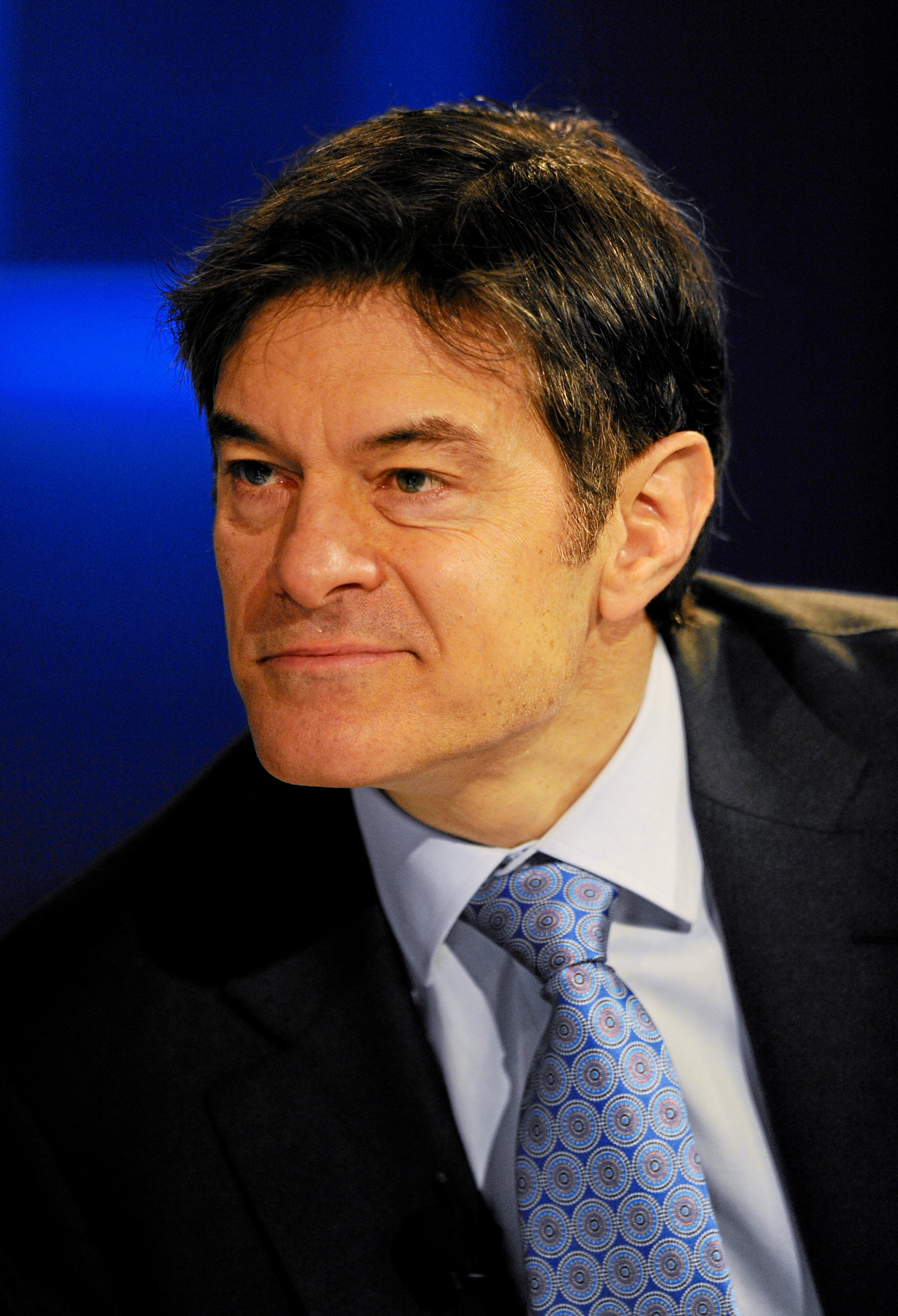
Mehmet Oz, Outstanding Informative Talk Show Host winner

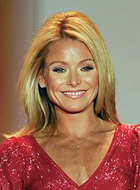
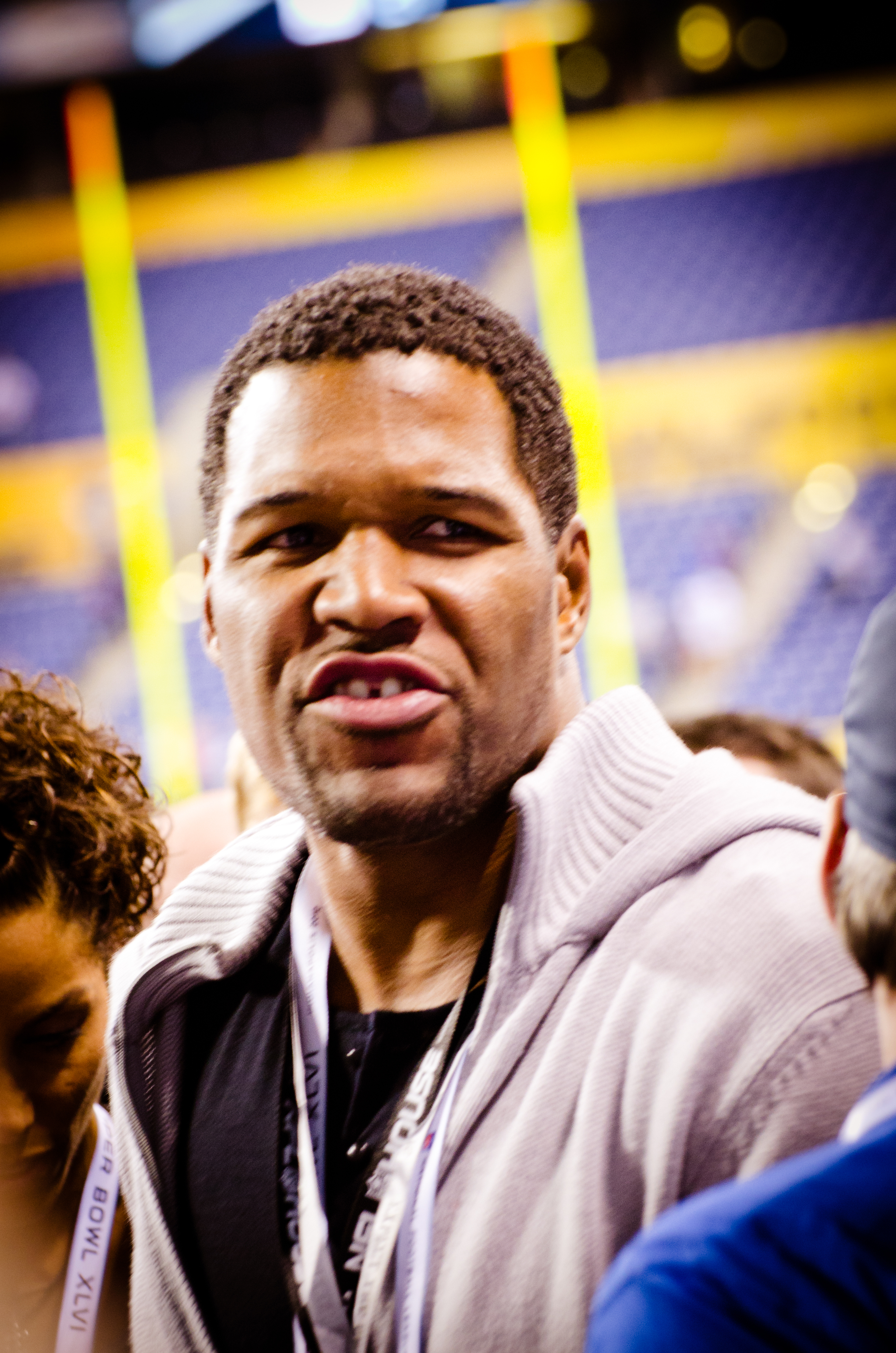
Kelly Ripa (top) and Michael Strahan (bottom), Outstanding Entertainment Talk Show Host winners

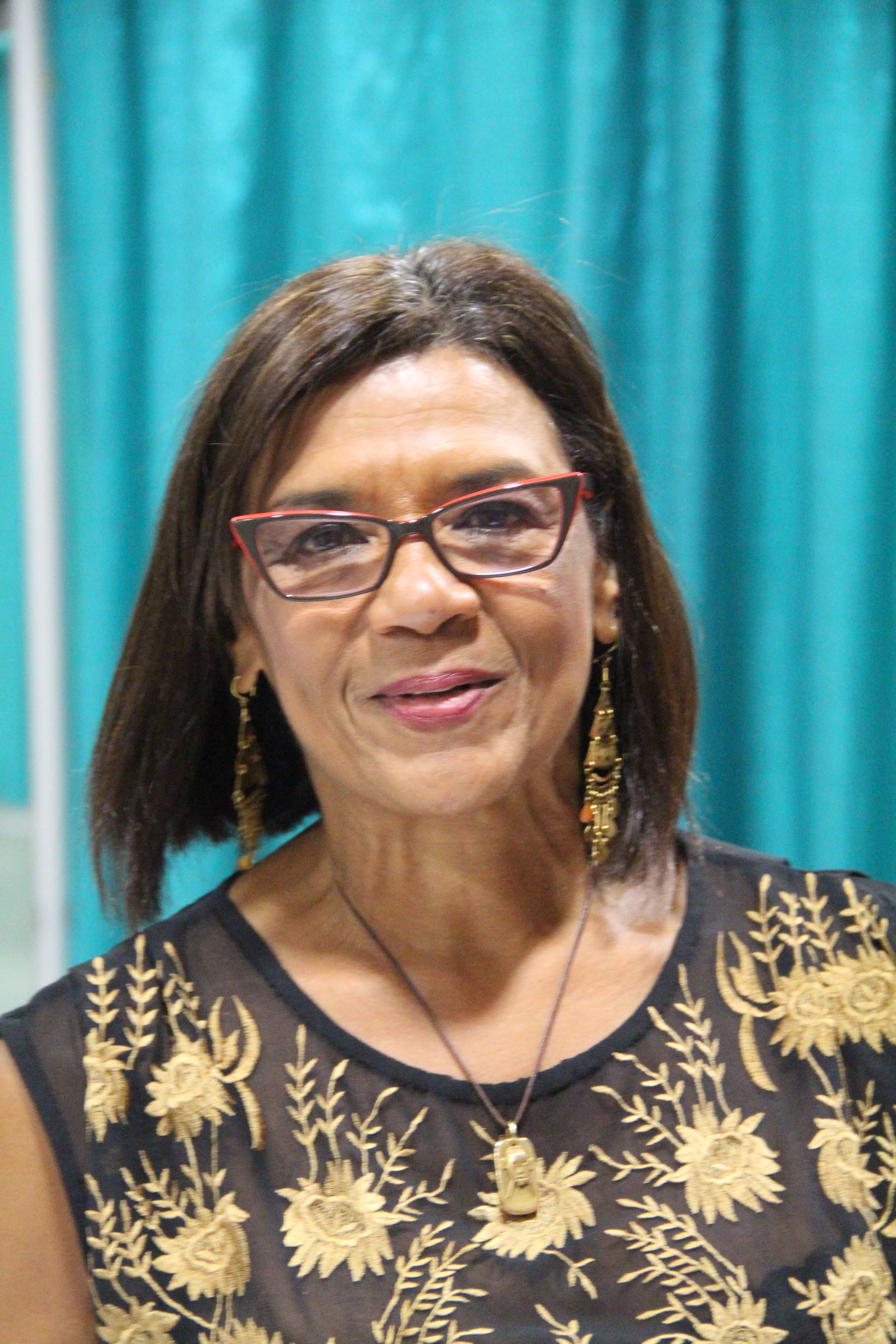
Sonia Manzano, Lifetime Achievement Award honoree

Category	Winners and nominees
Outstanding Drama Series	**General Hospital (ABC)** ‡; The Bold and the Beautiful (CBS); Days of Our Lives (NBC); The Young and the Restless (CBS)
Outstanding Game Show	**The Price Is Right (CBS)** ‡; Jeopardy! (Syndicated); Let's Make A Deal (CBS); Monopoly Millionaires' Club (Syndicated); Who Wants to Be a Millionaire (Syndicated)
Outstanding Morning Program	**CBS Sunday Morning** (CBS) ‡; CBS This Morning (CBS); Good Morning America (ABC); The Today Show (NBC)
Outstanding Morning Program in Spanish	**Café CNN** (CNN en Español) ‡; Un Nuevo Día (Telemundo); ¡Despierta América! (Univision)
Outstanding Talk Show/Informative	**The Chew** (ABC) ‡; The Dr. Oz Show (Syndicated); Larry King Now (Ora TV); The Doctors (Syndicated); The Kitchen (Food Network)
Outstanding Talk Show/Entertainment	**The Talk (CBS)** ‡; The Ellen DeGeneres Show (Syndicated); The Real (Syndicated); The View (ABC); The Wendy Williams Show (Syndicated)
Outstanding Entertainment News Program	**Extra (Syndicated)** ‡; Access Hollywood (NBC); Entertainment Tonight (Syndicated); The Insider (CBS); TMZ (Syndicated)
Outstanding Entertainment Program in Spanish	**SuperLatina with Gaby Natale** (SuperLatina + AGANARmedia + VmeTV) ‡; Clix (CNN en Español); Destinos (CNN en Español); Fuerza En Movimiento (CNN en Español); Vive la salud con la Dra. Azaret (CNN en Español)
Outstanding Lead Actress in a Drama Series	**Mary Beth Evans as Kayla Brady on Days of Our Lives (NBC)** ‡; Tracey E. Bregman as Lauren Fenmore Baldwin on The Young and the Restless (CBS); Kassie DePaiva as Eve Donovan on Days of Our Lives (NBC); Finola Hughes as Anna Devane on General Hospital (ABC); Maura West as Ava Jerome on General Hospital (ABC)
Outstanding Lead Actor in a Drama Series	**Tyler Christopher as Nikolas Cassadine on General Hospital** (ABC) ‡; Anthony Geary as Luke Spencer on General Hospital (ABC); Justin Hartley as Adam Newman on The Young and the Restless (CBS); Christian LeBlanc as Michael Baldwin on The Young and the Restless (CBS); Kristoff St. John as Neil Winters on The Young and the Restless (CBS)
Outstanding Supporting Actress in a Drama Series	**Jessica Collins as Avery Bailey Clark on The Young and the Restless** (CBS) ‡; Lauralee Bell as Christine Williams on The Young and the Restless (CBS); Linsey Godfrey as Caroline Spencer on The Bold and the Beautiful (CBS); Peggy McCay as Caroline Brady on Days of Our Lives (NBC); Melissa Reeves as Jennifer Horton on Days of Our Lives (NBC)
Outstanding Supporting Actor in a Drama Series	**Sean Blakemore as Shawn Butler on General Hospital (ABC)** ‡; Steve Burton as Dylan McAvoy on The Young and the Restless (CBS); Bryton James as Devon Hamilton on The Young and the Restless (CBS); Jacob Young as Rick Forrester on The Bold and the Beautiful (CBS); Dominic Zamprogna as Dante Falconeri on General Hospital (ABC)
Outstanding Younger Actress in a Drama Series	**True O'Brien as Paige Larson on Days of Our Lives (NBC)** ‡; Reign Edwards as Nicole Avant on The Bold and the Beautiful (CBS); Hunter King as Summer Newman on The Young and the Restless (CBS); Ashlyn Pearce as Aly Forrester on The Bold and the Beautiful (CBS); Brooklyn Rae Silzer as Emma Drake on General Hospital (ABC)
Outstanding Younger Actor in a Drama Series	**Bryan Craig as Morgan Corinthos on General Hospital (ABC)** ‡; Nicolas Bechtel as Spencer Cassadine on General Hospital (ABC); Max Ehrich as Fenmore Baldwin on The Young and the Restless (CBS); Pierson Fodé as Thomas Forrester on The Bold and the Beautiful (CBS); Tequan Richmond as TJ Ashford on General Hospital (ABC)
Outstanding Special Guest Performer in a Drama Series	**Obba Babatundé as Julius Avant on The Bold and the Beautiful (CBS)** ‡; Anna Maria Horsford as Vivienne Avant on The Bold and the Beautiful (CBS); Adam Leadbeater as Dr. Malcolm on Days Of Our Lives (NBC); Frank Runyeon as Angel on The Young And The Restless (CBS); Dee Wallace as Patricia Spencer on General Hospital (ABC)
Outstanding Daytime Talent in a Spanish Language Program	**Gaby Natale**, SuperLatina with Gaby Natale (SuperLatina + AGANARmedia + VmeTV) ‡; Raul De Molina, El Gordo y la Flaca (Univision); Carlos Calderon, El Gordo y la Flaca (Univision); Elizabeth Hernandez Curiel, El Gordo y la Flaca (Univision); Camilo Egana, Eucentro (CNN en Español)
Outstanding Game Show Host	**Craig Ferguson, Celebrity Name Game** (Syndicated) ‡; Wayne Brady, Let's Make a Deal (CBS); Brooke Burns, The Chase (Game Show Network); Billy Gardell, Monopoly Millionaires' Club (Syndicated); Steve Harvey, Family Feud (Syndicated)
Outstanding Informative Talk Show Host	**Dr. Mehmet Oz — The Dr. Oz Show (Syndicated)** ‡; Mario Batali, Carla Hall, Clinton Kelly, Daphne Oz and Michael Symon — The Chew (ABC); Steve Harvey — Steve Harvey (Syndicated); Larry King — Larry King Now (Ora TV); Peter Salgo — Second Opinion (PBS)
Outstanding Entertainment Talk Show Host	**Kelly Ripa and Michael Strahan — Live! with Kelly and Michael** (Syndicated) ‡; Adrienne Bailon, Tamar Braxton, Loni Love, Jeannie Mai, and Tamera Mowry — The Real (Syndicated); Julie Chen, Sara Gilbert, Sharon Osbourne, Aisha Tyler, and Sheryl Underwood — The Talk (CBS); Joy Behar, Candace Cameron Bure, Michelle Collins, Paula Faris, Whoopi Goldberg, Rosie Perez, Raven-Symoné, and Nicolle Wallace — The View (ABC); Wendy Williams — The Wendy Williams Show (Syndicated)
Outstanding Drama Series Writing Team	**The Bold and the Beautiful (CBS)** ‡ – Head Writer: Bradley Bell; Co-Head Writer: Michael Minnis; Writers: Rex M. Best, Shannon Bradley, Adam Dusevoir, Tracey Ann Kelley, Patrick Mulcahey, Mark Pinciotti, John F. Smith, Michele Val Jean; General Hospital (ABC) – Head Writers: Shelly Altman, Ron Carlivati, Jean Passanante; Breakdown Writers: Anna Theresa Cascio, Daniel James O'Connor, Chris Van Etten; Script Writers: Andrea Archer Compton, Suzanne Flynn, Kate Hall, Elizabeth Korte, Katherine Schock, Scott Sickles; The Young and the Restless (CBS) – Head Writers:Shelly Altman, Jean Passanante, Charles Pratt, Jr.; Co-Head Writer: Tracey Thomson; Writers: Amanda L. Beall, Jeff Beldner, Brent Boyd, Michael Conforti, Susan Dansby, Janice Ferri Esser, Lucky Gold, Beth Milstein, Anne Schoettle, Natalie Minardi Slater
Outstanding Drama Series Directing Team	**General Hospital (ABC)** ‡; The Bold and the Beautiful (CBS); Days of Our Lives (NBC); The Young and the Restless (CBS)

=== Lifetime Achievement Award ===
- Sonia Manzano

== Presenters and performances ==
The following individuals presented awards or performed musical acts.

=== Presenters (in order of appearance) ===
Name(s)	Role
Randy West	Announcer for the 43rd Annual Daytime Emmy Awards
Mario Lopez	Presenter of the award for Outstanding Supporting Actor in a Drama Series
Julie Chen; Sara Gilbert; Sharon Osbourne; Aisha Tyler; Sheryl Underwood	Presenters of the award for Outstanding Morning Program
Brooke Burns; Matt Doran	Presenters of the award for Outstanding Talk Show/Entertainment
Daphne Oz; Dr. Mehmet Oz	Presenters of the award for Outstanding Entertainment Talk Show Host
Pierson Fodé; Hunter King	Presenters of the award for Outstanding Supporting Actress in a Drama Series
Adrienne Bailon; Tamar Braxton; Loni Love; Jeannie Mai; Tamera Mowry	Presenters of the award for Outstanding Game Show
Billy Flynn; Jen Lilley	Presenters of the award for Outstanding Game Show Host
Camila Banus; Teresa Castillo	Presenters of the award for Outstanding Entertainment Program in Spanish, Outstanding Morning Program in Spanish and Outstanding Daytime Talent in a Spanish Language Program
Brandon McMillan	Presenter of the award for Outstanding Younger Actress in a Drama Series
Andrew Ordon; Jennifer Ashton	Presenters of the award for Outstanding Younger Actor in a Drama Series
Sandra Lee	Social Issues Segment
Rita Moreno	Presenter of the Lifetime Achievement Award
Carla Hall; Larry King	Presenters of the award for Outstanding Drama Series Directing Team
Karla Mosley; Jacob Young	Presenters of the award for Outstanding Drama Series Writing Team
Kristos Andrews; Van Hansis	Presenter of the award for Outstanding Special Guest Performer in a Drama Series
Debbie Matenopoulos; Donnell Turner	Presenter of the award for Outstanding Talk Show/Informative
Kevin Frazier; Nancy O'Dell	Presenters of the award for Outstanding Informative Talk Show Host and In Memoriam
Gina Tognoni; Jason Thompson	Presenters of the award for Outstanding Entertainment News Program
Laura Wright	Presenter of the award for Outstanding Lead Actor in a Drama Series
Chris Harrison	Presenter of the award for Outstanding Lead Actress in a Drama Series
Shemar Moore	Presenter of the award for Outstanding Drama Series

=== Performers ===
Name(s)	Role	Performed
Julie Garnyé	Performer	"For Good" during the In Memoriam tribute
