= Daytime Emmy Award for Outstanding Entertainment News Program =

Annual television award

- Awarded for: Outstanding Entertainment News Program
- Country: United States
- Presented by: NATAS; ATAS
- First award: 2014
- Currently held by: Entertainment Tonight (2024)

Highlights
- Most awards: Entertainment Tonight (9)
- Most nominations: Access Hollywood; Entertainment Tonight; Extra (11)
- Website: theemmys.tv/daytime/

The Daytime Emmy Award for Outstanding Entertainment News Program is an award presented annually by the National Academy of Television Arts and Sciences (NATAS) and Academy of Television Arts & Sciences (ATAS). It is given to honor a television newsmagazine that covers "the entertainment industry with a focus on human interest, popular culture and celebrity gossip and interviews". Programs of this genre airing between the hours of 2:00 a.m. and 8:00 p.m. are eligible to enter.

This category additionally awards the work of the producer titles, segment producer(s), host(s), anchor(s) and correspondent(s) "credited on a minimum of 19% of the original episodes". At the 41st Daytime Emmy Awards held in 2014, Entertainment Tonight and Extra were the first winners of this award when they tied in this category. The awards ceremony was not televised in 2014, and instead aired only online through the DaytimeEmmys.net website as there was an inability to find a proper TV broadcast channel.

Since its inception, the award has been given to two entertainment news program. Entertainment Tonight holds the record for the most awards, winning four occasions. This program also joins Access Hollywood and Extra for having the most nominations, with a total of five. As of the 2024 ceremony, Entertainment Tonight became the most recent recipient of the award.

== Winners and nominees ==
Listed below are the winners of the award for each year, as well as the other nominees.

Table key
‡	Indicates the winner

Year	Program	Network	Ref.
2014 (41st)
2014 (41st)	Entertainment Tonight ‡	Syndicated	
2014 (41st)	Extra ‡	Syndicated	
2014 (41st)	Access Hollywood	NBC	
2014 (41st)	E! News	E!	
2014 (41st)	TMZ	Syndicated	
2015 (42nd)
2015 (42nd)	Entertainment Tonight ‡	Syndicated	
2015 (42nd)	Access Hollywood	NBC	
2015 (42nd)	E! News	E! Entertainment	
2015 (42nd)	Extra	Syndicated	
2015 (42nd)	The Insider	CBS	
2016 (43rd)
2016 (43rd)	Extra ‡	Syndicated	
2016 (43rd)	Access Hollywood	NBC	
2016 (43rd)	Entertainment Tonight	Syndicated	
2016 (43rd)	The Insider	CBS	
2016 (43rd)	TMZ	Syndicated	
2017 (44th)
2017 (44th)	Entertainment Tonight ‡	CBS	
2017 (44th)	Access Hollywood	NBC	
2017 (44th)	E! News	E!	
2017 (44th)	Extra	Syndicated	
2017 (44th)	Inside Edition	Syndicated	
2018 (45th)
2018 (45th)	Entertainment Tonight ‡	Syndicated	
2018 (45th)	Access Hollywood	NBC	
2018 (45th)	DailyMailTV	Syndicated	
2018 (45th)	E! News	E! Entertainment	
2018 (45th)	Extra	Syndicated	
2019 (46th)
2019 (46th)	DailyMailTV ‡	Syndicated	
2019 (46th)	Entertainment Tonight	Syndicated	
2019 (46th)	Access Hollywood	NBC	
2019 (46th)	Inside Edition	Syndicated	
2019 (46th)	Extra	Syndicated	
2020 (47th)
2020 (47th)	Entertainment Tonight ‡	Syndicated	
2020 (47th)	Access Hollywood	NBC	
2020 (47th)	E! News	E! Entertainment	
2020 (47th)	Extra	Syndicated	
2020 (47th)	Inside Edition	Syndicated	
2021 (48th)
2021 (48th)	Entertainment Tonight ‡	Syndicated	
2021 (48th)	Access Hollywood	NBC	
2021 (48th)	E!’s Daily Pop	E! Entertainment	
2021 (48th)	Extra	Syndicated	
2021 (48th)	Inside Edition	Syndicated	
2022 (49th)
2022 (49th)	Entertainment Tonight ‡	Syndicated	
2022 (49th)	Access Hollywood	NBC	
2022 (49th)	Extra	Syndicated	
2022 (49th)	Inside Edition	Syndicated	
2023 (50th)
2023 (50th)	Entertainment Tonight ‡	Syndicated	
2023 (50th)	Access Hollywood	NBC	
2023 (50th)	E! News	E!	
2023 (50th)	Extra	Syndicated	
2023 (50th)	Inside Edition	Syndicated	
2024 (51st)
2024 (51st)	Entertainment Tonight ‡	Syndicated	
2024 (51st)	Access Hollywood	Syndicated	
2024 (51st)	Extra	Syndicated	
2025 (52nd)
2025 (52nd)	Entertainment Tonight ‡	Syndicated	
2025 (52nd)	Access Hollywood	Syndicated	
2025 (52nd)	E! News	Syndicated	
2025 (52nd)	Extra	Syndicated	

== Series with multiple wins ==
9 wins

- Entertainment Tonight

2 wins

- Extra

== Series with multiple nominations ==
11 nominations

- Access Hollywood
- Entertainment Tonight
- Extra

6 nominations

- E! News
- Inside Edition

2 nominations

- DailyMailTV
- The Insider
- TMZ
