= Daytime Emmy Award for Outstanding Talk Show Entertainment =

Annual award ceremony

- Awarded for: Outstanding Talk Show Entertainment
- Country: United States
- Presented by: NATAS/ATAS
- First award: 2008
- Final award: 2022
- Currently held by: The Kelly Clarkson Show (2022)
- Website: theemmys.tv/daytime/

The Daytime Emmy Award for Outstanding Talk Show Entertainment was an award presented annually by the National Academy of Television Arts and Sciences (NATAS) and the Academy of Television Arts & Sciences (ATAS). The award was given in honor of a talk show that was in the entertainment nature. It was awarded from the 35th Daytime Emmy Awards ceremony, held in 2008, to the 49th Daytime Emmy Awards ceremony, held in 2022. During this period, the generic Outstanding Talk Show category was split into two specific categories: this award and Outstanding Talk Show Informative. In 2023, the NATAS merged the two specific categories back into one.

The Ellen DeGeneres Show held the record for the most awards in this specific entertainment talk show category, winning on seven occasions, and the most nominations, with a total of eleven.

== Winners and nominees ==
Listed below are the winners of the award for each year, as well as the other nominees.

Table key
‡	Indicates the winner

Year	Program	Network	Ref
2000s
2008 35th	Rachael Ray ‡	Syndicated	
2008 35th	The Ellen DeGeneres Show	Syndicated	
2008 35th	The View	ABC	
2009 (36th)	Rachael Ray ‡	Syndicated	
2009 (36th)	The Ellen DeGeneres Show	Syndicated	
2009 (36th)	Live! with Regis and Kelly	Syndicated	
2010s
2010 (37th)	The Ellen DeGeneres Show	Syndicated	
2010 (37th)	Rachael Ray	Syndicated	
2010 (37th)	Live! with Regis and Kelly	Syndicated	
2011 (38th)	The Ellen DeGeneres Show ‡	Syndicated	
2011 (38th)	Rachael Ray	Syndicated	
2011 (38th)	Live! with Regis and Kelly	Syndicated	
2011 (38th)	The View	ABC	
2012 (39th)	Live! with Regis and Kelly ‡	Syndicated	
2012 (39th)	The Ellen DeGeneres Show	Syndicated	
2012 (39th)	The Talk	CBS	
2012 (39th)	The View	ABC	
2013 (40th)	The Ellen DeGeneres Show ‡	Syndicated	
2013 (40th)	Live! with Kelly and Michael	Syndicated	
2013 (40th)	The Talk	CBS	
2013 (40th)	The View	ABC	
2014 (41st)	The Ellen DeGeneres Show ‡	Syndicated	
2014 (41st)	Live! with Kelly and Michael	Syndicated	
2014 (41st)	Rachael Ray	Syndicated	
2014 (41st)	The Talk	CBS	
2014 (41st)	The View	ABC	
2015 (42nd)	The Ellen DeGeneres Show ‡	Syndicated	
2015 (42nd)	Live! with Kelly and Michael	Syndicated	
2015 (42nd)	The Talk	CBS	
2015 (42nd)	The Wendy Williams Show	Syndicated	
2016 (43rd)	The Talk ‡	CBS	
2016 (43rd)	The Ellen DeGeneres Show	Syndicated	
2016 (43rd)	The Real	Syndicated	
2016 (43rd)	The View	ABC	
2016 (43rd)	The Wendy Williams Show	Syndicated	
2017 (44th)	The Ellen DeGeneres Show ‡	Syndicated	
2017 (44th)	Live! with Kelly	Syndicated	
2017 (44th)	Maury	Syndicated	
2017 (44th)	The Talk	CBS	
2017 (44th)	The View	ABC	
2018 (45th)	The Talk ‡	CBS	
2018 (45th)	The Ellen DeGeneres Show	Syndicated	
2018 (45th)	Live! with Kelly and Ryan	Syndicated	
2018 (45th)	The Real	Syndicated	
2018 (45th)	The View	ABC	
2019 (46th)	The Ellen DeGeneres Show ‡	Syndicated	
2019 (46th)	A Little Help with Carol Burnett	Netflix	
2019 (46th)	The Real	Syndicated	
2019 (46th)	The Talk	CBS	
2019 (46th)	The View	ABC	
2020s
2020 (47th)
2020 (47th)	The Ellen DeGeneres Show ‡	Syndicated	
2020 (47th)	GMA3: Strahan, Sara and Keke	ABC	
2020 (47th)	The Kelly Clarkson Show	Syndicated	
2020 (47th)	Live with Kelly and Ryan	Syndicated	
2020 (47th)	The Talk	CBS	
2021 (48th)	The Kelly Clarkson Show ‡	Syndicated	
2021 (48th)	The Drew Barrymore Show	Syndicated	
2021 (48th)	The Ellen DeGeneres Show	Syndicated	
2021 (48th)	Live with Kelly and Ryan	Syndicated	
2021 (48th)	Today with Hoda & Jenna	NBC	
2022 (49th)	The Kelly Clarkson Show‡	Syndicated	
2022 (49th)	The Drew Barrymore Show	Syndicated	
2022 (49th)	Hot Ones	YouTube	
2022 (49th)	Live with Kelly and Ryan	Syndicated	
2022 (49th)	Today with Hoda & Jenna	NBC	

== Multiple wins/nominations ==
Number	Program
Wins
8	The Ellen DeGeneres Show
2	The Kelly Clarkson Show
2	Rachael Ray
2	The Talk
Nominations
14	The Ellen DeGeneres Show
9	The Talk
9	The View
5	Rachael Ray
4	Live! with Kelly and Ryan
4	Live! with Regis and Kelly
3	The Kelly Clarkson Show
3	Live! with Kelly and Michael
3	The Real
2	The Drew Barrymore Show
2	Today with Hoda & Jenna
2	The Wendy Williams Show
