= Daytime Emmy Award for Outstanding Talk Show Informative =

Television award category

- Awarded for: Outstanding Talk Show Informative
- Country: United States
- Presented by: NATAS/ATAS
- First award: 2008
- Final award: 2022
- Currently held by: Turning the Tables with Robin Roberts (2022)
- Website: theemmys.tv/daytime/

The Daytime Emmy Award for Outstanding Talk Show Informative was an award presented annually by the National Academy of Television Arts and Sciences (NATAS) and Academy of Television Arts & Sciences (ATAS). The award was given in honor of a talk show that was of the informative nature. It was awarded from the 35th Daytime Emmy Awards ceremony, held in 2008, to the 49th Daytime Emmy Awards ceremony, held in 2022. During this period, the generic Outstanding Talk Show category was split into two specific categories: this award and Outstanding Talk Show Entertainment. In 2023, the NATAS merged the two specific categories back into one.

== Winners and nominees ==
Listed below are the winners of the award for each year, as well as the other nominees.

Key	Meaning
‡	Indicates the winning talk show

Year	Program	Network	Ref
2000s
2008 (35th)	The Tyra Banks Show ‡	Syndicated	
2008 (35th)	Dr. Phil	Syndicated	
2008 (35th)	A Place of Our Own	PBS	
2009 (36th)	The Tyra Banks Show ‡	Syndicated	
2009 (36th)	The Doctors	Syndicated	
2009 (36th)	Dr. Phil	Syndicated	
2010s
2010 (37th)	The Doctors ‡	Syndicated	
2010 (37th)	Dr. Phil	Syndicated	
2010 (37th)	The Dr. Oz Show	Syndicated	
2011 (38th)	The Dr. Oz Show ‡	Syndicated	
2011 (38th)	Dr. Phil	Syndicated	
2011 (38th)	The Doctors	Syndicated	
2012 (39th)	The Dr. Oz Show ‡	Syndicated	
2012 (39th)	Anderson	Syndicated	
2012 (39th)	The Doctors	Syndicated	
2013 (40th)	The Dr. Oz Show ‡	Syndicated	
2013 (40th)	The Doctors	Syndicated	
2013 (40th)	Katie	Syndicated	
2014 (41st)	Steve Harvey ‡	Syndicated	
2014 (41st)	The Chew	ABC	
2014 (41st)	The Dr. Oz Show	Syndicated	
2014 (41st)	Dr. Phil	Syndicated	
2015 (42nd)	Steve Harvey ‡	Syndicated	
2015 (42nd)	The Chew	ABC	
2015 (42nd)	The Dr. Oz Show	Syndicated	
2015 (42nd)	The Kitchen	Food Network	
2016 (43rd)	The Chew ‡	ABC	
2016 (43rd)	The Dr. Oz Show	Syndicated	
2016 (43rd)	Larry King Now	Ora TV	
2016 (43rd)	The Doctors	Syndicated	
2016 (43rd)	The Kitchen	Food Network	
2017 (44th)	The Dr. Oz Show ‡	Syndicated	
2017 (44th)	The Chew	ABC	
2017 (44th)	The Kitchen	Food Network	
2017 (44th)	Larry King Now	Ora TV	
2017 (44th)	Steve Harvey	Syndicated	
2018 (45th)	The Dr. Oz Show ‡	Syndicated	
2018 (45th)	The Chew	ABC	
2018 (45th)	Larry King Now	Ora TV	
2018 (45th)	Megyn Kelly Today	NBC	
2018 (45th)	Steve	Syndicated	
2019 (46th)	Rachael Ray ‡	Syndicated	
2019 (46th)	Access Live	NBC	
2019 (46th)	The Dr. Oz Show	Syndicated	
2019 (46th)	Red Table Talk	Facebook Watch	
2019 (46th)	Today Show with Kathie Lee & Hoda	NBC	
2020s
2020 (47th)
2020 (47th)	The View ‡	ABC	
2020 (47th)	The 3rd Hour of Today	NBC	
2020 (47th)	Rachael Ray	Syndicated	
2020 (47th)	Red Table Talk	Facebook Watch	
2020 (47th)	Today with Hoda & Jenna	NBC	
2021 (48th)
2021 (48th)	Red Table Talk: Season 3 ‡	Facebook Watch	
2021 (48th)	The 3rd Hour of Today	NBC	
2021 (48th)	GMA3: What You Need To Know	ABC	
2021 (48th)	Red Table Talk: The Estefans	Facebook Watch	
2021 (48th)	Tamron Hall	Syndicated	
2022 (49th)
2022 (49th)	Turning the Tables with Robin Roberts ‡	Disney +	
2022 (49th)	GMA3: What You Need To Know	ABC	
2022 (49th)	Peace of Mind with Taraji	Facebook Watch	
2022 (49th)	Red Table Talk	Facebook Watch	
2022 (49th)	Red Table Talk: The Estefans	Facebook Watch	
2022 (49th)	Tamron Hall	Syndicated	

== Multiple wins/nominations ==
Number	Program
Wins
5	The Dr. Oz Show
2	The Tyra Banks Show
2	Steve Harvey
Nominations
10	The Dr. Oz Show
6	The Doctors
5	Dr. Phil
4	The Chew
3	The Kitchen
3	Steve Harvey
3	Larry King Now
2	The Tyra Banks Show
2	Rachael Ray
2	GMA3: What You Need To Know
2	Tamron Hall
