= 42nd Daytime Emmy Awards =

- Promotional advertisement
- Awarded for: Outstanding achievement in all fields of daytime television
- Date: April 26, 2015
- Location: Warner Bros. Studios, Burbank, Los Angeles, California, U.S.
- Country: United States
- Presented by: National Academy of Television Arts and Sciences
- Hosted by: Tyra Banks

Highlights
- Most awards: Major: General Hospital / The Young and the Restless (3); All: The Bold and the Beautiful (10)
- Most nominations: General Hospital (28)
- Outstanding Drama Series: Days of Our Lives and The Young and the Restless (tie)
- Outstanding Game Show: Jeopardy!
- Website: emmyonline.org

Television/radio coverage
- Network: Pop
- Runtime: 110 minutes
- Produced by: Michael Levitt; Gary Tellalian; Mike Rothman
- Directed by: Joe DeMaio

The 42nd Daytime Emmy Awards, presented by the National Academy of Television Arts and Sciences (NATAS), "recognizes outstanding achievement in all fields of daytime television production and are presented to individuals and programs broadcast from 2:00 a.m. to 6:00 p.m. during the 2014 calendar year". The ceremony took place on April 26, 2015, at the Warner Bros. Studios in Burbank, California, 5:00 p.m. PST / 8:00 p.m. EST. The ceremony, televised in the United States by Pop was executive produced by Michael Levitt, Gary Tellalian and Mike Rothman. Talk show host, actress and producer Tyra Banks hosted the show for the first time.

The drama pre-nominees were announced on February 4, 2015, and the standard nominations were announced on March 31, 2015, during an episode of The Talk. In related events, the 42nd Daytime Creative Arts Emmy Awards ceremony was held at the Universal Hilton in Los Angeles on April 24, 2015, with Jeopardy! icon Alex Trebek and The Brady Bunch actress Florence Henderson serving as the ceremony's hosts.

Variety reported that the return of the Daytime Emmys on Television was due that the Academy hoped to rebound in viewership after the previous year's internet-only ceremony, which also resulted in a high-volume of no-shows among the nominees. The awards ceremony was also moved up from its normal month in June to April to improve participation since many shows were still in production during that time. The Academy also choose to hold the ceremonies at the Warner Bros. Studios instead of a hotel ballroom like in previous years so participants "would feel [more] comfortable". They specifically picked Stage 16, where Casablanca and other famous films were produced. It was later announced that the Lifetime Achievement Award would be presented to Betty White.

== Winners and nominees ==
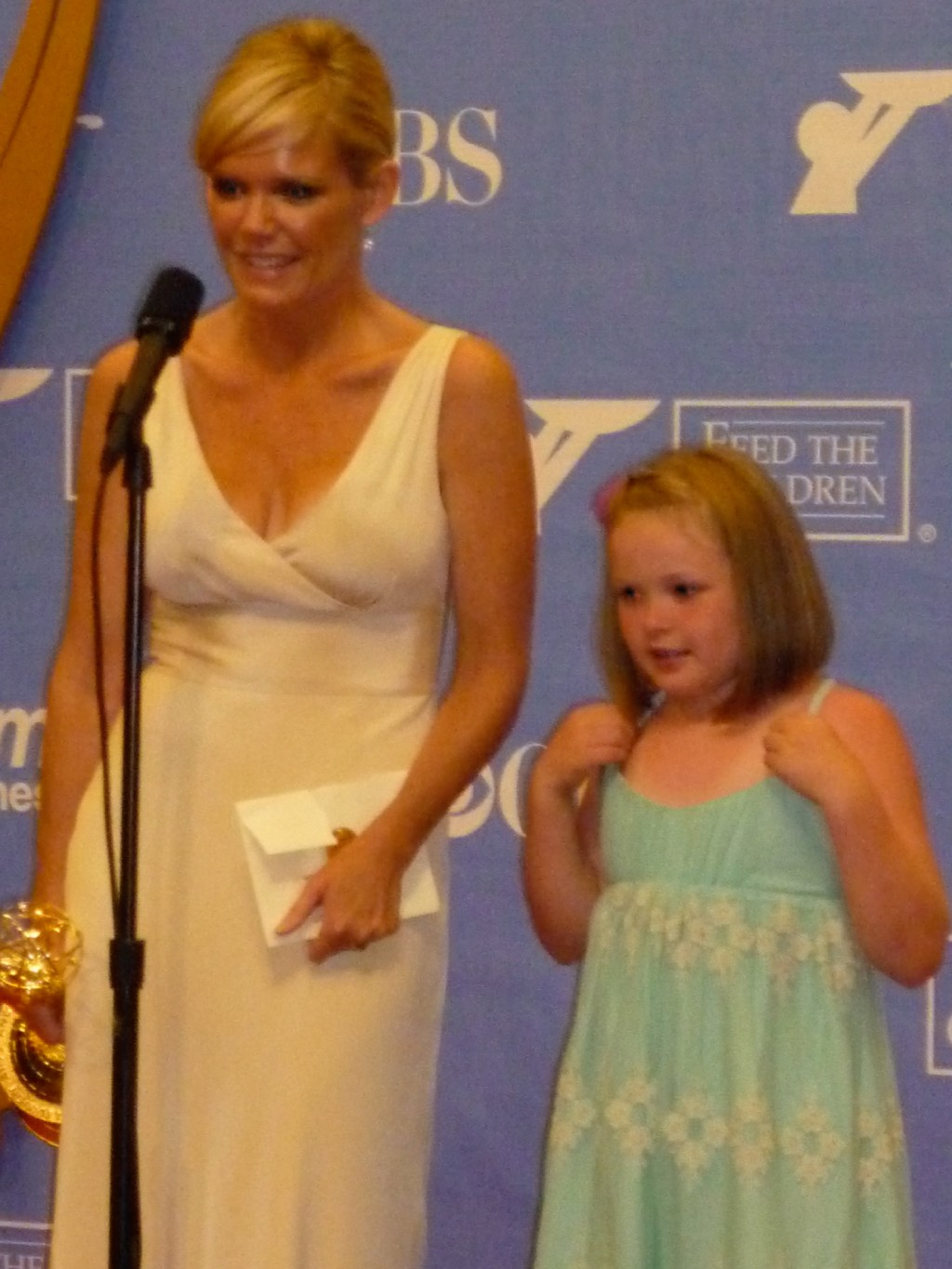
Maura West, Outstanding Lead Actress in a Drama Series winner

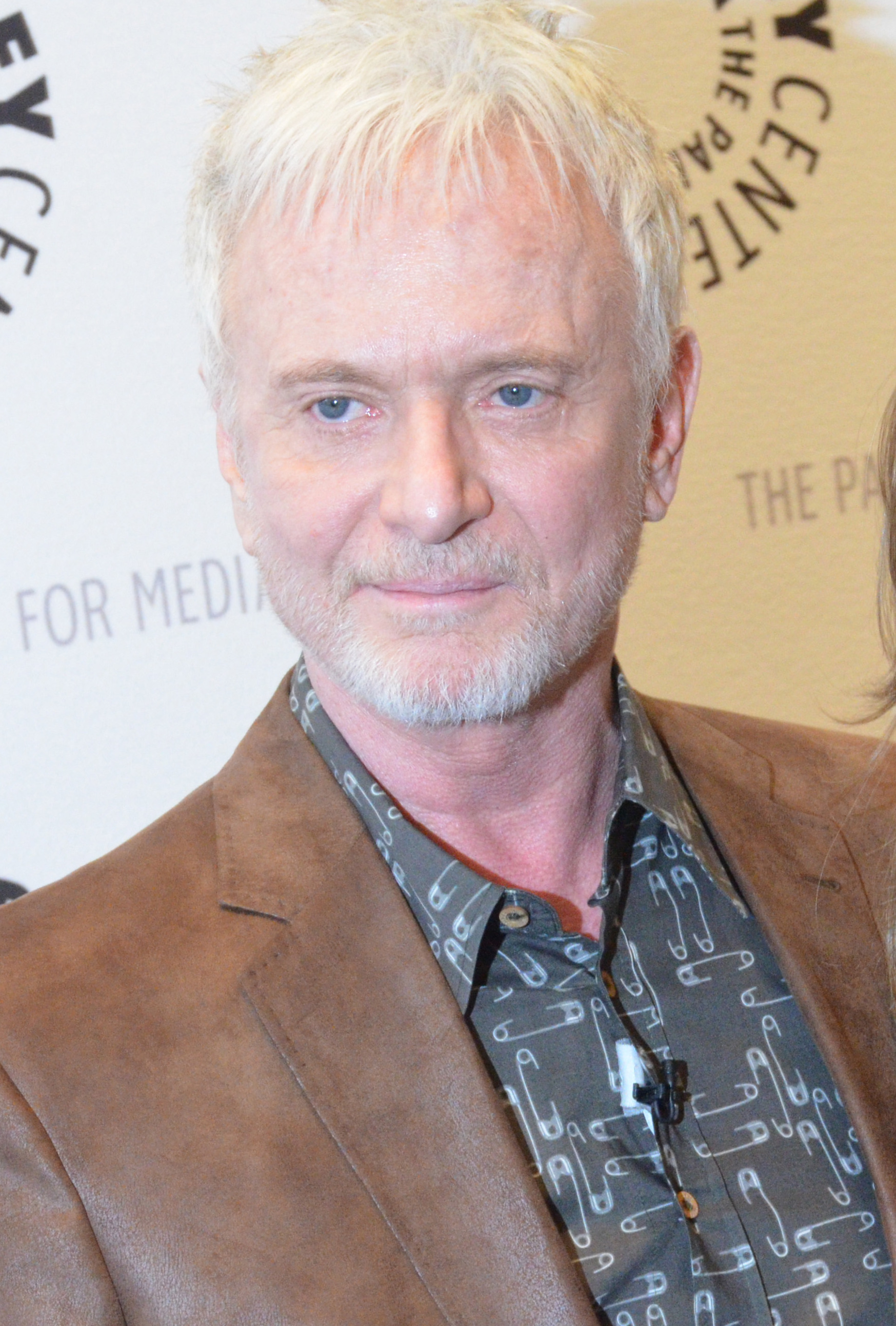
Anthony Geary, Outstanding Lead Actor in a Drama Series winner

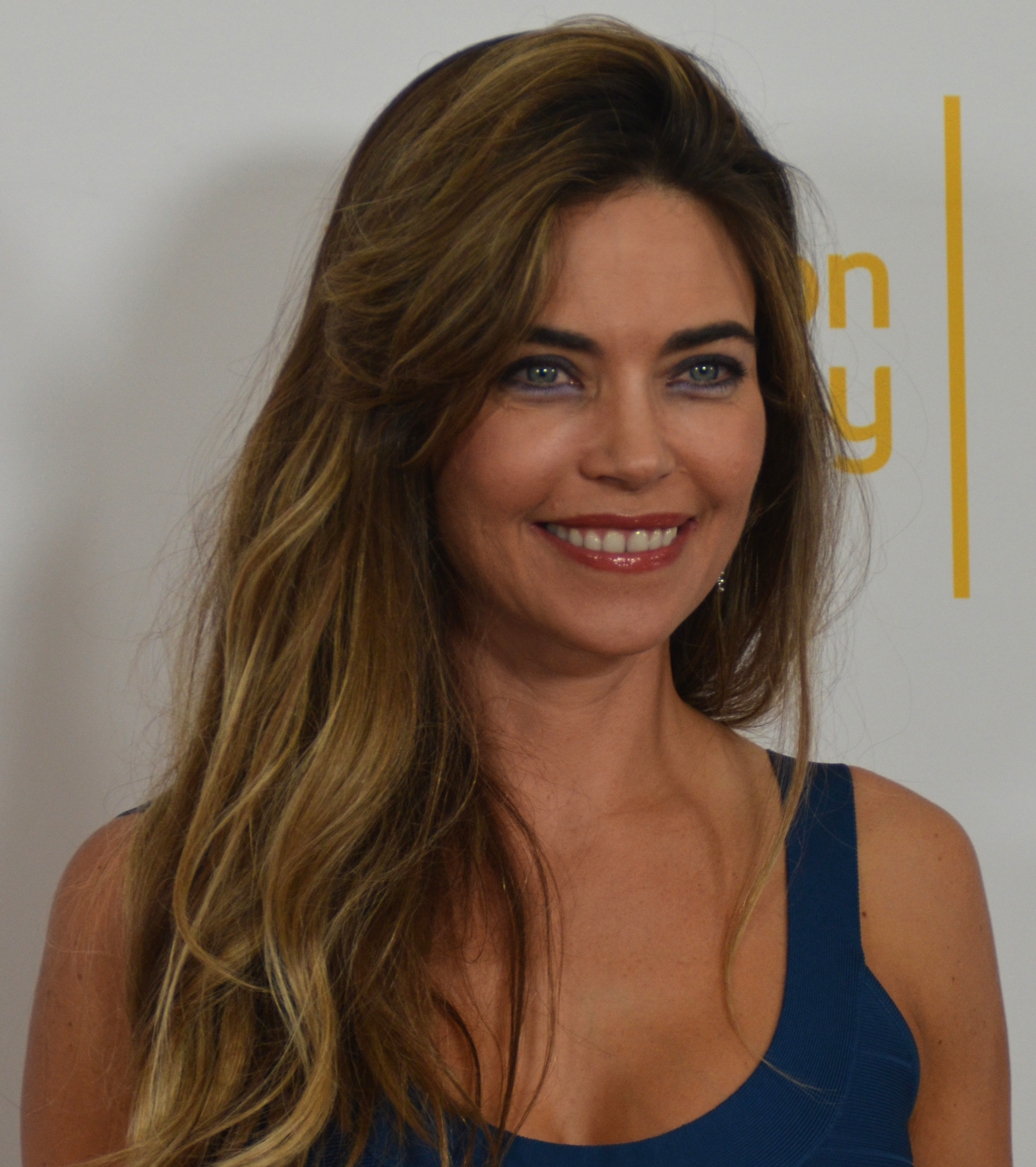
Amelia Heinle, Outstanding Supporting Actress in a Drama Series winner

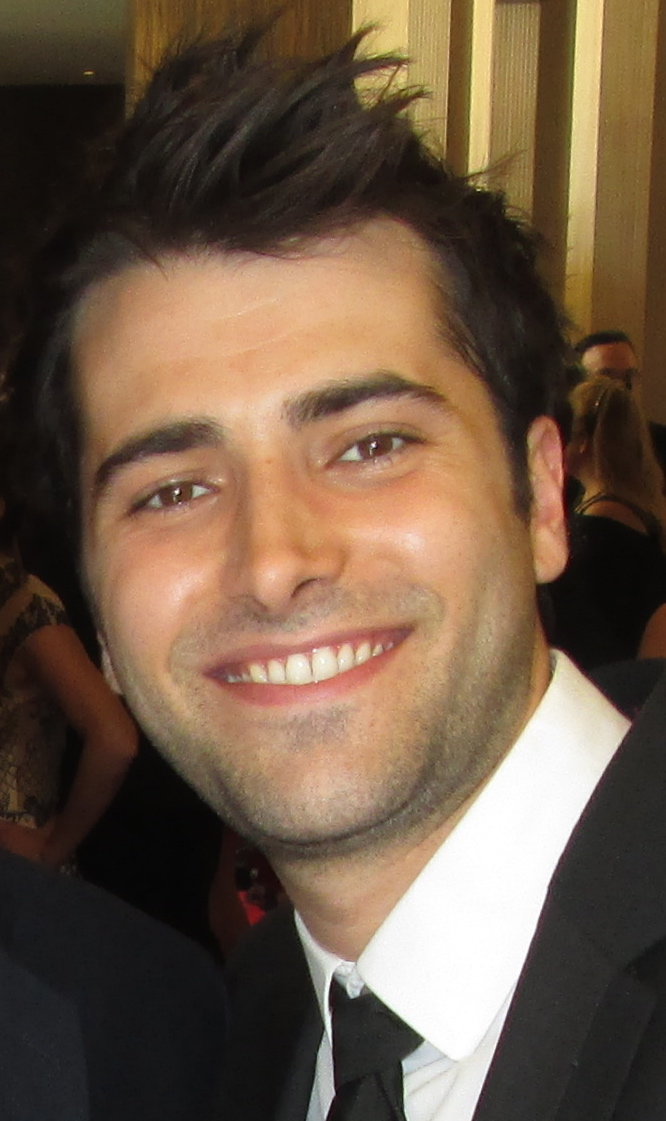
Freddie Smith, Outstanding Younger Actor in a Drama Series winner

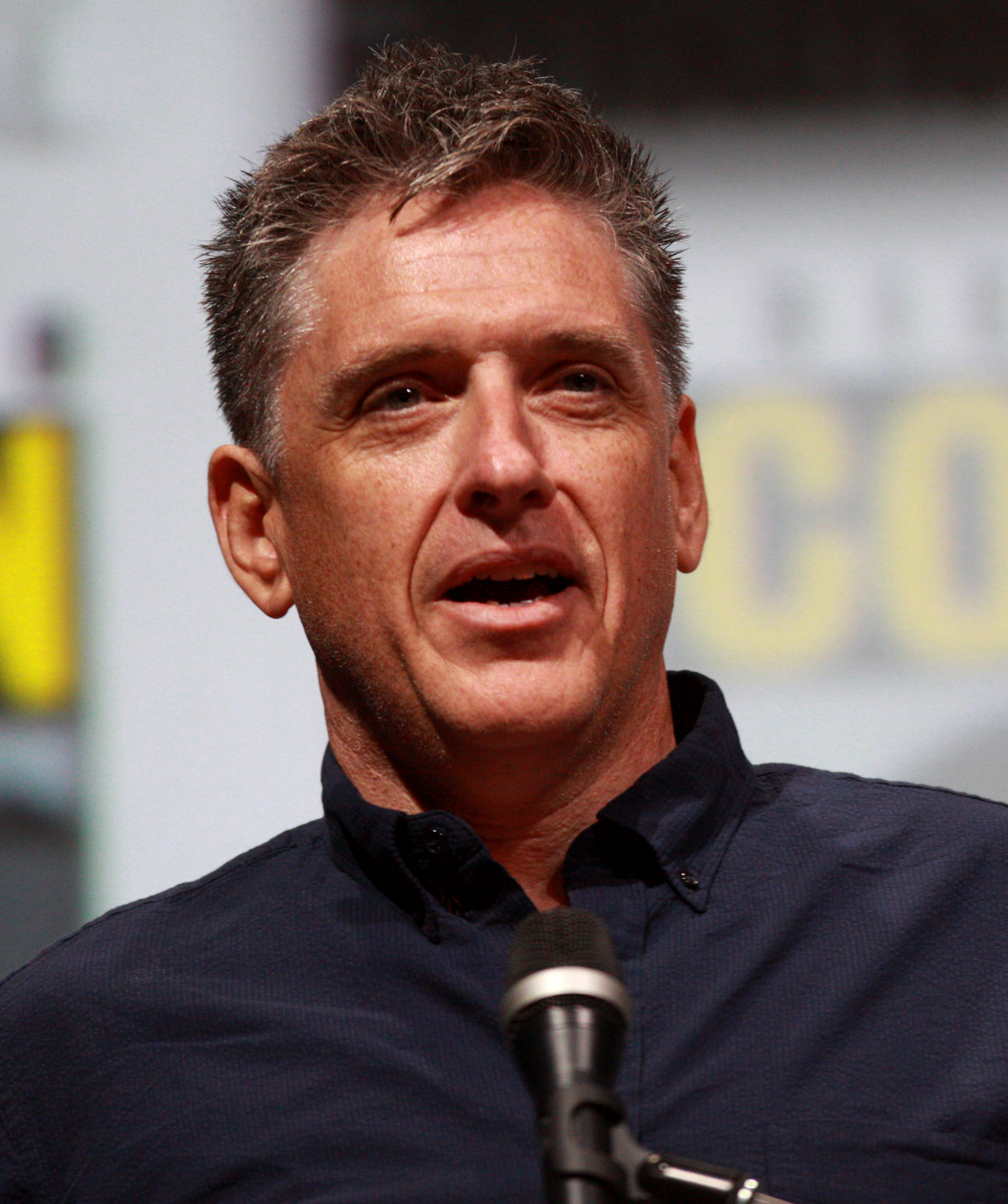
Craig Ferguson, Outstanding Game Show Host winner

In the lists below, the winner of the category is shown first, with a double-dagger (‡), followed by the other nominees.

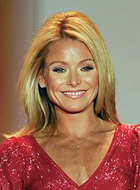
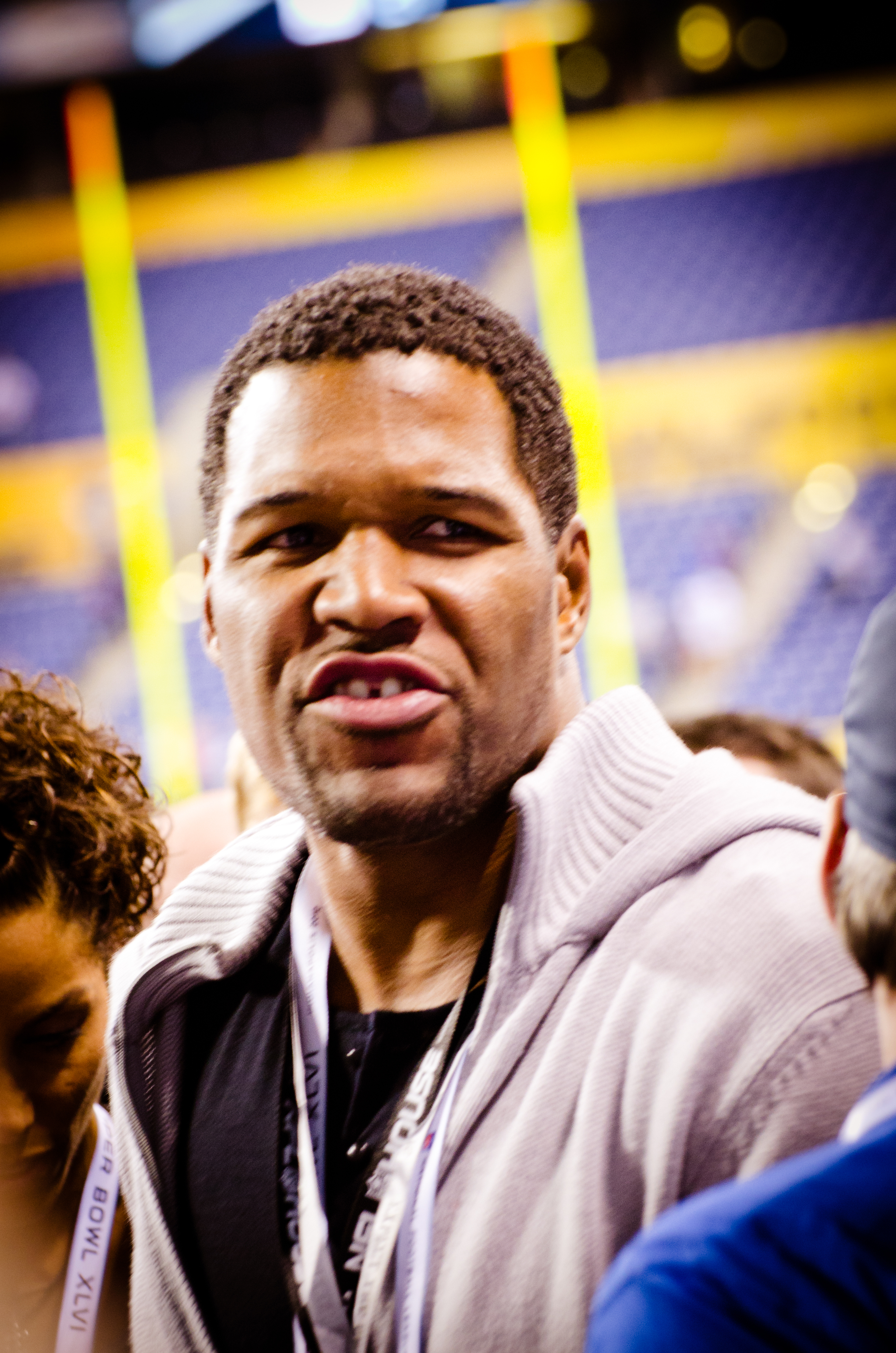
Kelly Ripa (top) and Michael Strahan (bottom), Outstanding Entertainment Talk Show Host winners

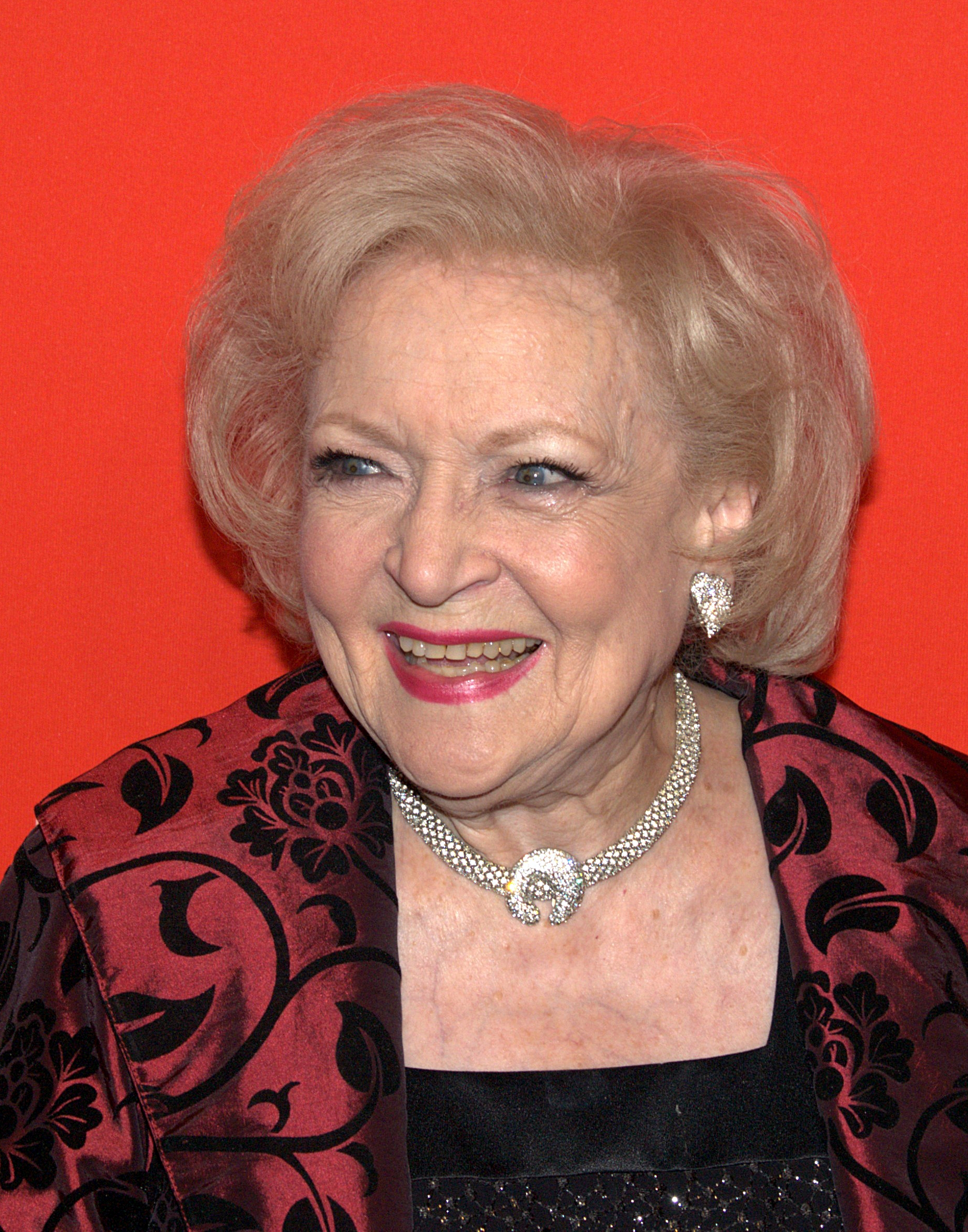
Betty White, Lifetime Achievement Award honoree.

Category	Winners and nominees
Outstanding Drama Series	Days of Our Lives (NBC) ‡; The Young and the Restless (CBS) ‡; The Bold and the Beautiful (CBS); General Hospital (ABC)
Outstanding Culinary Program	Barefoot Contessa: Back to Basics (Food Network) ‡; Guy's Big Bite (Food Network); Martha Bakes (PBS); The Mind of a Chef (PBS); My Grandmother’s Ravioli (Cooking Channel)
Outstanding Game Show	Jeopardy! (Syndicated) ‡; Family Feud (Syndicated); The Price Is Right (CBS)
Outstanding Morning Program	CBS News Sunday Morning (CBS) ‡; Good Morning America (ABC); The Today Show (NBC)
Outstanding Morning Program in Spanish	Un Nuevo Día (Telemundo) ‡; Café CNN (CNN en Español); ¡Despierta América! (Univision)
Outstanding Talk Show/Informative	Steve Harvey (Syndicated) ‡; The Chew (ABC); The Dr. Oz Show (Syndicated); The Kitchen (Food Network)
Outstanding Talk Show/Entertainment	The Ellen DeGeneres Show (Syndicated) ‡; Live! with Kelly and Michael (Syndicated); The Talk (CBS); The Wendy Williams Show (Syndicated)
Outstanding Entertainment News Program	Entertainment Tonight (CBS) ‡; Access Hollywood (NBC); E! News (E! Entertainment); Extra (Syndicated); The Insider (CBS)
Outstanding Lead Actress in a Drama Series	Maura West as Ava Jerome on General Hospital (ABC) ‡; Peggy McCay as Caroline Brady on Days of Our Lives (NBC); Alison Sweeney as Sami Brady DiMera on Days of Our Lives (NBC); Gina Tognoni as Phyllis Newman on The Young and the Restless (CBS); Laura Wright as Carly Corinthos on General Hospital (ABC)
Outstanding Lead Actor in a Drama Series	Anthony Geary as Luke Spencer on General Hospital (ABC) ‡; Christian LeBlanc as Michael Baldwin on The Young and the Restless (CBS); Billy Miller as Billy Abbott on The Young and the Restless (CBS); Jason Thompson as Dr. Patrick Drake on General Hospital (ABC)
Outstanding Supporting Actress in a Drama Series	Amelia Heinle as Victoria Newman on The Young and the Restless (CBS) ‡; Linsey Godfrey as Caroline Spencer Forrester on The Bold and the Beautiful; Elizabeth Hendrickson as Chloe Fisher on The Young and the Restless (CBS); Finola Hughes as Anna Devane on General Hospital (ABC); Lisa LoCicero as Olivia Falconeri on General Hospital (ABC)
Outstanding Supporting Actor in a Drama Series	Chad Duell as Michael Corinthos on General Hospital (ABC) ‡; Scott Clifton as Liam Spencer on The Bold and the Beautiful (CBS); Kristoff St. John as Neil Winters on The Young and the Restless (CBS); Jacob Young as Rick Forrester on The Bold and the Beautiful (CBS)
Outstanding Younger Actress in a Drama Series	Hunter King as Summer Newman on The Young and the Restless (CBS) ‡; Kristen Alderson as Kiki Jerome on General Hospital (ABC); Camila Banus as Gabi Hernandez on Days of Our Lives (NBC); Haley Pullos as Molly Lansing-Davis on General Hospital (ABC)
Outstanding Younger Actor in a Drama Series	Freddie Smith as Sonny Kiriakis on Days of Our Lives (NBC) ‡; Bryan Craig as Morgan Corinthos on General Hospital (ABC); Max Ehrich as Fenmore Baldwin on The Young and the Restless (CBS); Tequan Richmond as TJ Ashford on General Hospital (ABC)
Outstanding Game Show Host	Craig Ferguson, Celebrity Name Game (Syndicated)‡; Steve Harvey, Family Feud (Syndicated); Todd Newton, Family Game Night (Hub Network); Pat Sajak, Wheel of Fortune (Syndicated)
Outstanding Entertainment Talk Show Host	Kelly Ripa and Michael Strahan – Live! with Kelly and Michael (Syndicated) ‡; Julie Chen Moonves, Sara Gilbert, Sharon Osbourne, Aisha Tyler, and Sheryl Underwood – The Talk (CBS); Wendy Williams – The Wendy Williams Show (Syndicated)
Outstanding Informative Talk Show Host	Mario Batali, Carla Hall, Clinton Kelly, Daphne Oz and Michael Symon – The Chew (ABC) ‡; Dr. Mehmet Oz – The Dr. Oz Show (Syndicated); Steve Harvey – Steve Harvey (Syndicated)
Outstanding Drama Series Writing Team	The Bold and the Beautiful (CBS) ‡; Days of Our Lives (NBC); General Hospital (ABC); The Young and the Restless (CBS)
Outstanding Drama Series Directing Team	The Bold and the Beautiful (CBS) ‡; Days of Our Lives (NBC); General Hospital (ABC); The Young and the Restless (CBS)

=== Lifetime Achievement Award ===
- Betty White

== Presenters and performances ==
The following individuals presented awards or performed musical acts.

=== Presenters (in order of appearance) ===
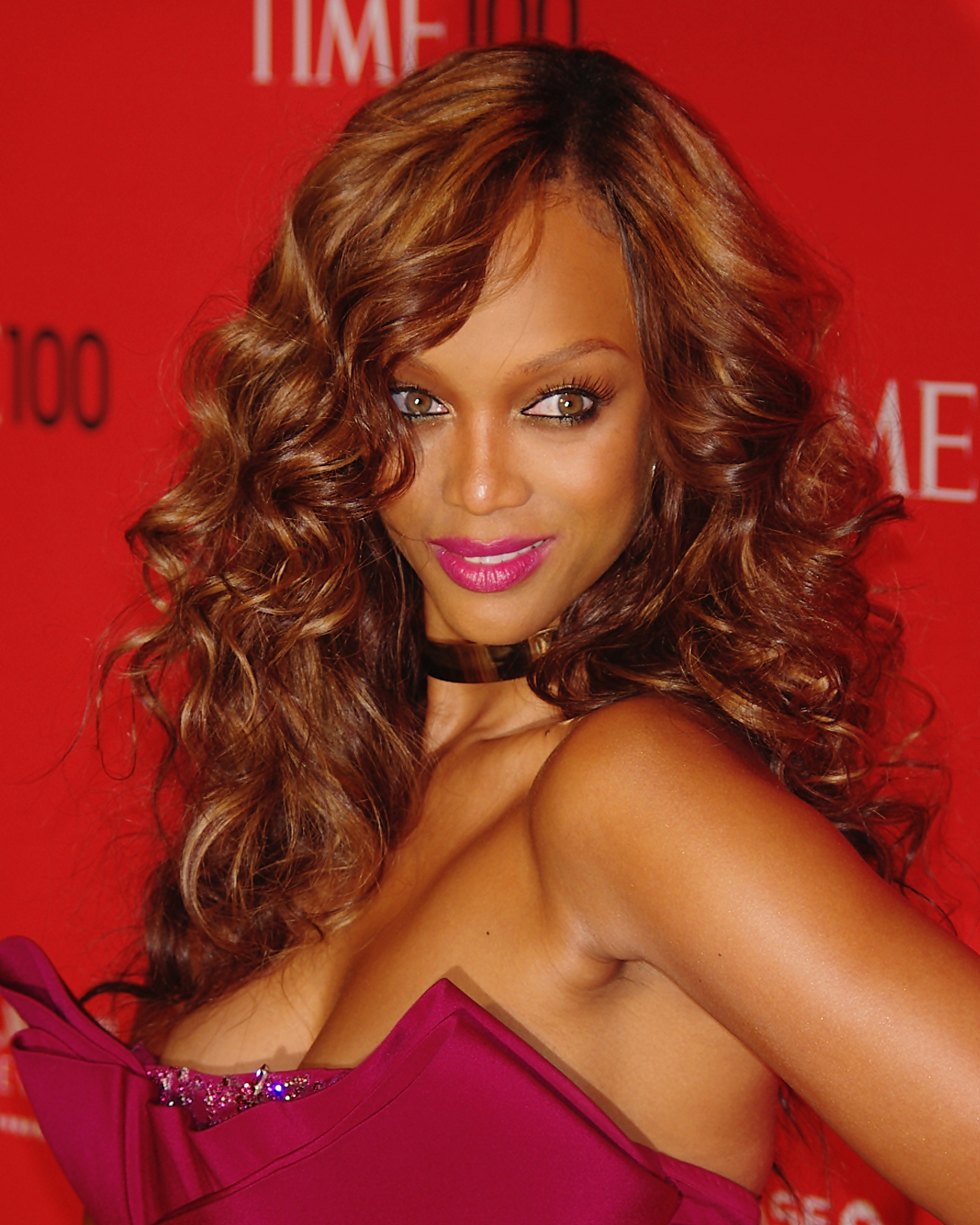
Tyra Banks served as the host and a presenter during the ceremony

Name	Role
Christian Lanz	Announcer the 42nd Annual Daytime Emmy Awards
Steve Harvey	Presenter of the award for Outstanding Supporting Actress in a Drama Series
Leeza Gibbons; Alex Trebek	Presenters of the award for Outstanding Entertainment News Program
Julie Chen Moonves; Sara Gilbert; Sharon Osbourne; Aisha Tyler; Sheryl Underwood	Presenters of the award for Outstanding Game Show Host
Ryan Paevey; Kirsten Storms	Presenters of the award for Outstanding Morning Program
Daniel Goddard; Sharon Hofreiter	Presenters of the award for Outstanding Supporting Actor in a Drama Series
Mario Lopez	Presenter of the award for Outstanding Morning Program in Spanish
Charo; Tom Bergeron; Marie Osmond; Regis Philbin; Fred Willard	Presenters of the Lifetime Achievement Award
Linsey Godfrey; Karla Mosley; Jacob Young	Presenters of the award for Outstanding Younger Actor in a Drama Series and Outstanding Younger Actress in a Drama Series
Ashley; Tyra Banks; Lauren Makk; Chrissy Teigen; Joe Zee	Presenters of the award for Outstanding Talk Show/Informative and Outstanding Entertainment Talk Show Host
Lindsay Hartley; Crystal Hunt; Donna Mills; Chrystee Pharris	Presenters of the award for Outstanding Drama Series Directing Team
Alan Thicke	Presenter of the award for Outstanding Drama Series Writing Team
Christopher Sean; Freddie Smith; Guy Wilson	Presenters of the award for Outstanding Game Show
Melissa Claire Egan; Justin Hartley	Presenters of the award for Outstanding Informative Talk Show Host
Kevin Frazier; Nancy O'Dell	Presenters of the award for Outstanding Culinary Program
Deidre Hall	Tribute of the 50th Anniversary of Days of Our Lives
Melissa Rivers	Tribute to Joan Rivers and In Memoriam
Craig Ferguson	Presenter of the award for Outstanding Talk Show/Entertainment
Eileen Davidson	Presenter of the award for Outstanding Lead Actor in a Drama Series
Shemar Moore	Presenter of the award for Outstanding Lead Actress in a Drama Series
Genie Francis; Anthony Geary	Presenters of the award for Outstanding Drama Series

=== Performers ===
Name(s)	Role	Performed
Tessanne Chin	Performer: Daytime Soap Couple Tribute	"What I Did for Love"
Babyface	Performer: In Memoriam	"Gone Too Soon"
