= 45th Daytime Emmy Awards =

- Awarded for: Outstanding achievement in daytime television
- Date: April 29, 2018
- Location: Pasadena Civic Auditorium; Pasadena, California, U.S.
- Country: United States
- Presented by: NATAS; ATAS
- Hosted by: Mario Lopez; Sheryl Underwood

Highlights
- Most nominations: General Hospital (26)
- Outstanding Drama Series: Days of Our Lives
- Outstanding Game Show: The Price Is Right
- Website: emmyonline.org

Television/radio coverage
- Network: Webcast

The 45th Daytime Emmy Awards, presented by the National Academy of Television Arts and Sciences (NATAS), "recognizes outstanding achievement in all fields of daytime television production and are presented to individuals and programs broadcast from 2:00 a.m. to 6:00 p.m. during the 2017 calendar year". The ceremony took place on April 29, 2018, at the Pasadena Civic Auditorium in Pasadena, California.

The drama pre-nominees were announced on January 25, 2018, and the standard nominations were announced on March 21, 2018, during an episode of The Talk. ABC's General Hospital has the most nominations with 26. The 45th Daytime Creative Arts Emmy Awards ceremony, for extended Daytime Emmy categories, were held at the Pasadena Civic Auditorium on April 27, 2018.

Mario Lopez and Sheryl Underwood returned to host the ceremony, which was broadcast as a live webcast via various live streaming and social networking services (including Facebook, Twitter, and YouTube), forgoing a traditional television broadcast for the third year in a row.

== Winners and nominees ==
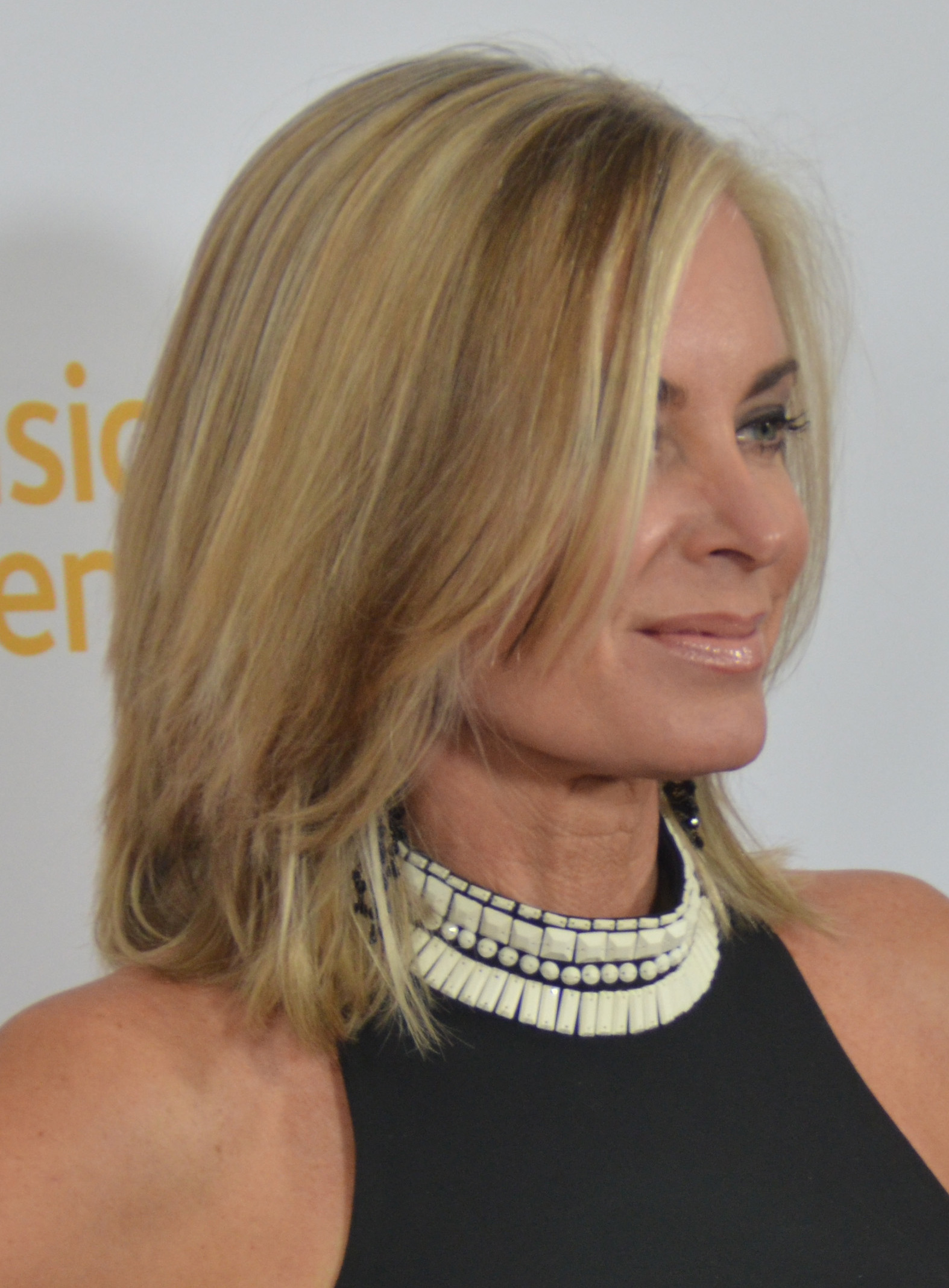
Eileen Davidson, Outstanding Lead Actress in a Drama Series winner

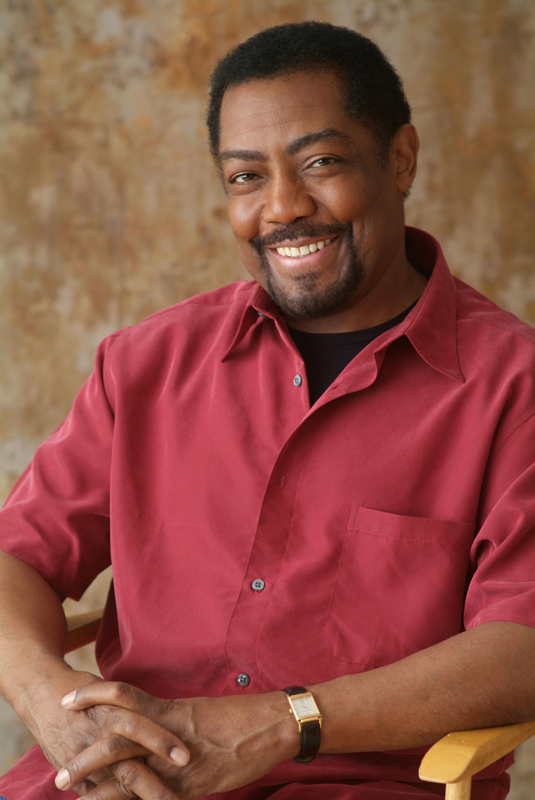
James Reynolds, Outstanding Lead Actor in a Drama Series winner

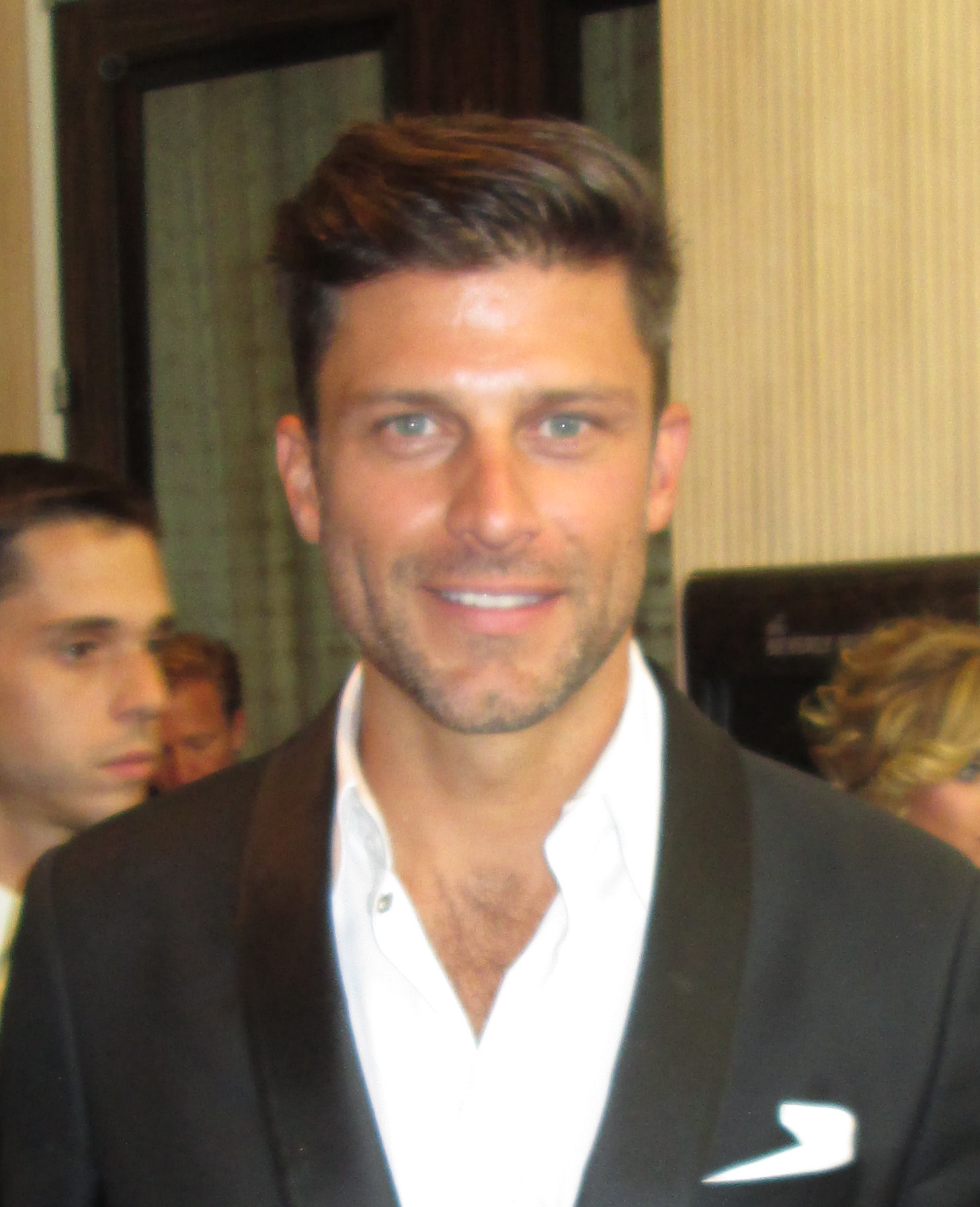
Greg Vaughan, Outstanding Supporting Actor in a Drama Series winner

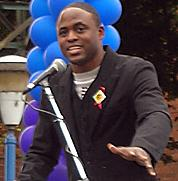
Wayne Brady, Outstanding Game Show Host winner

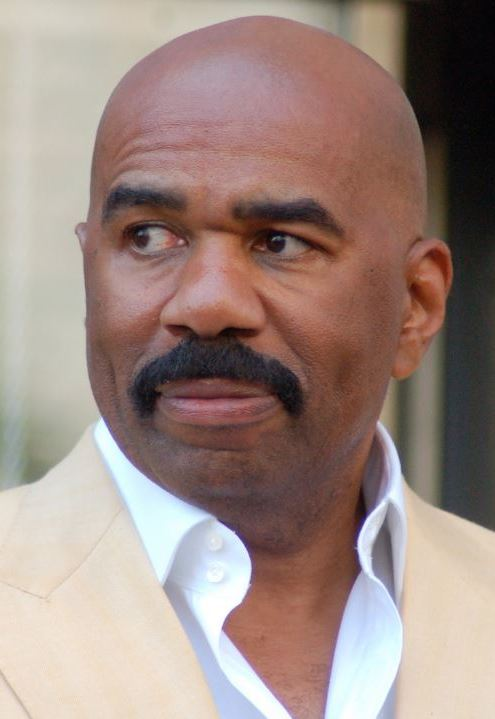
Steve Harvey, Outstanding Informative Talk Show Host winner

Winners are listed first, highlighted in boldface.

| Category | Nominees |
|---|---|
| Outstanding Drama Series | **Days of Our Lives** (NBC); The Bold and the Beautiful (CBS); The Young and the Restless (CBS); General Hospital (ABC) |
| Outstanding Digital Daytime Drama Series | **The Bay: The Series** (Tubi); EastSiders (Netflix); Ladies of the Lake (Amazon Studios); Tainted Dreams (Amazon Studios); Venice: The Series (venicetheseries.com); Zac & Mia (Verizon go90) |
| Outstanding Game Show | **The Price Is Right** (CBS); Family Feud (Syndicated); Jeopardy! (Syndicated); Let's Make a Deal (CBS); Who Wants to Be a Millionaire (Syndicated) |
| Outstanding Morning Program | **Good Morning America** (ABC); CBS Sunday Morning (CBS); CBS This Morning (CBS); Today (NBC) |
| Outstanding Talk Show/Informative | **The Dr. Oz Show** (Syndicated); The Chew (ABC); Larry King Now (Ora TV); Megyn Kelly Today (NBC); Steve (Syndicated) |
| Outstanding Talk Show/Entertainment | **The Talk** (CBS); Ellen (Syndicated); Live with Kelly and Ryan (Syndicated); The Real (Syndicated); The View (ABC) |
| Outstanding Entertainment News Program | **Entertainment Tonight** (Syndicated); Access Hollywood (Syndicated); Daily Mail TV (Syndicated); E! News (E!); Extra (Syndicated) |
| Outstanding Lead Actress in a Drama Series | **Eileen Davidson as Ashley Abbott, The Young and the Restless**; Nancy Lee Grahn as Alexis Davis, General Hospital; Marci Miller as Abigail Deveraux DiMera, Days of Our Lives; Maura West as Ava Jerome, General Hospital; Laura Wright as Carly Corinthos, General Hospital |
| Outstanding Lead Actor in a Drama Series | **James Reynolds as Abe Carver, Days of Our Lives**; Peter Bergman as Jack Abbott, The Young and the Restless; Michael Easton as Dr. Hamilton Finn, General Hospital; John McCook as Eric Forrester, The Bold and the Beautiful; Billy Miller as Jason Morgan/Drew Cain, General Hospital |
| Outstanding Supporting Actress in a Drama Series | **Camryn Grimes as Mariah Copeland, The Young and the Restless**; Marla Adams as Dina Mergeron Abbott, The Young and the Restless; Susan Seaforth Hayes as Julie Olson Williams, Days of Our Lives; Elizabeth Hendrickson as Chloe Mitchell, The Young and the Restless; Mishael Morgan as Hilary Curtis, The Young and the Restless; Jacqueline MacInnes Wood as Steffy Forrester Spencer, The Bold and the Beautiful |
| Outstanding Supporting Actor in a Drama Series | **Greg Vaughan as Eric Brady, Days of Our Lives**; Wally Kurth as Ned Quartermaine, General Hospital; Chandler Massey as Will Horton, Days of Our Lives; Anthony Montgomery as Dr. Andre Maddox, General Hospital; Greg Rikaart as Kevin Fisher, The Young and the Restless |
| Outstanding Younger Actress in a Drama Series | **Chloe Lanier as Nelle Benson, General Hospital**; Reign Edwards as Nicole Avant Forrester-Dominguez, The Bold and the Beautiful; Hayley Erin as Kiki Jerome, General Hospital; Cait Fairbanks as Tessa Porter, The Young and the Restless; Olivia Rose Keegan as Claire Brady, Days of Our Lives |
| Outstanding Younger Actor in a Drama Series | **Rome Flynn as Zende Forrester-Dominguez, The Bold and the Beautiful**; Lucas Adams as Tripp Dalton, Days of Our Lives; Tristan Lake Leabu as Reed Hellstrom, The Young and the Restless; Casey Moss as JJ Deveraux, Days of Our Lives; Hudson West as Jake Spencer, General Hospital |
| Outstanding Guest Performer in a Drama Series | **Vernee Watson as Stella Henry on General Hospital**; Ryan Ashton as Zach Sinnett on The Young and the Restless; Robb Derringer as Scooter Nelson on Days of Our Lives; John Enos as Roger on Days of Our Lives; Morgan Fairchild as Anjelica Deveraux on Days of Our Lives |
| Outstanding Game Show Host | **Wayne Brady, Let's Make a Deal** (CBS); Chris Harrison, Who Wants to Be a Millionaire (Syndicated); Steve Harvey, Family Feud (Syndicated); Pat Sajak, Wheel of Fortune (Syndicated); Alex Trebek, Jeopardy! (Syndicated) |
| Outstanding Informative Talk Show Host | **Steve Harvey, Steve** (Syndicated); Kit Hoover and Natalie Morales, Access Hollywood Live (NBC); Dr. Mehmet Oz, The Dr. Oz Show (Syndicated); Larry King, Larry King Now (Ora TV); Kellie Pickler and Ben Aaron, Pickler and Ben (CMT) |
| Outstanding Entertainment Talk Show Host | **Adrienne Houghton, Loni Love, Jeannie Mai and Tamera Mowry-Housley, The Real** (Syndicated); Harry Connick Jr., Harry (Syndicated); Kelly Ripa and Ryan Seacrest, Live With Kelly and Ryan (Syndicated); Whoopi Goldberg, Joy Behar, Sara Haines, Sunny Hostin, Meghan McCain, Paula Faris and Jedediah Bila, The View (ABC); Julie Chen, Sara Gilbert, Sharon Osbourne, Aisha Tyler and Sheryl Underwood, The Talk (CBS) |
| Outstanding Drama Series Writing Team | **Days of Our Lives** (NBC); The Bold and the Beautiful (CBS); General Hospital (ABC); The Young and the Restless (CBS) |
| Outstanding Drama Series Directing Team | **Days of Our Lives** (NBC); The Bold and the Beautiful (CBS); General Hospital (ABC); The Young and the Restless (CBS) |

== Lifetime Achievement Awards ==
The NATAS announced the following winners of the Lifetime Achievement Award on February 1, 2018:

- Bill and Susan Seaforth Hayes, long-running actors on Days of Our Lives
  - The Hayes were honored during the main ceremony on April 29
- Sid and Marty Krofft, who were influential in children's television and variety show programs
  - The Kroffts were honored during the Creative Arts ceremony on April 27.

== Presenters and performances ==
The following individuals presented awards or performed musical acts.

=== Presenters (in order of appearance) ===
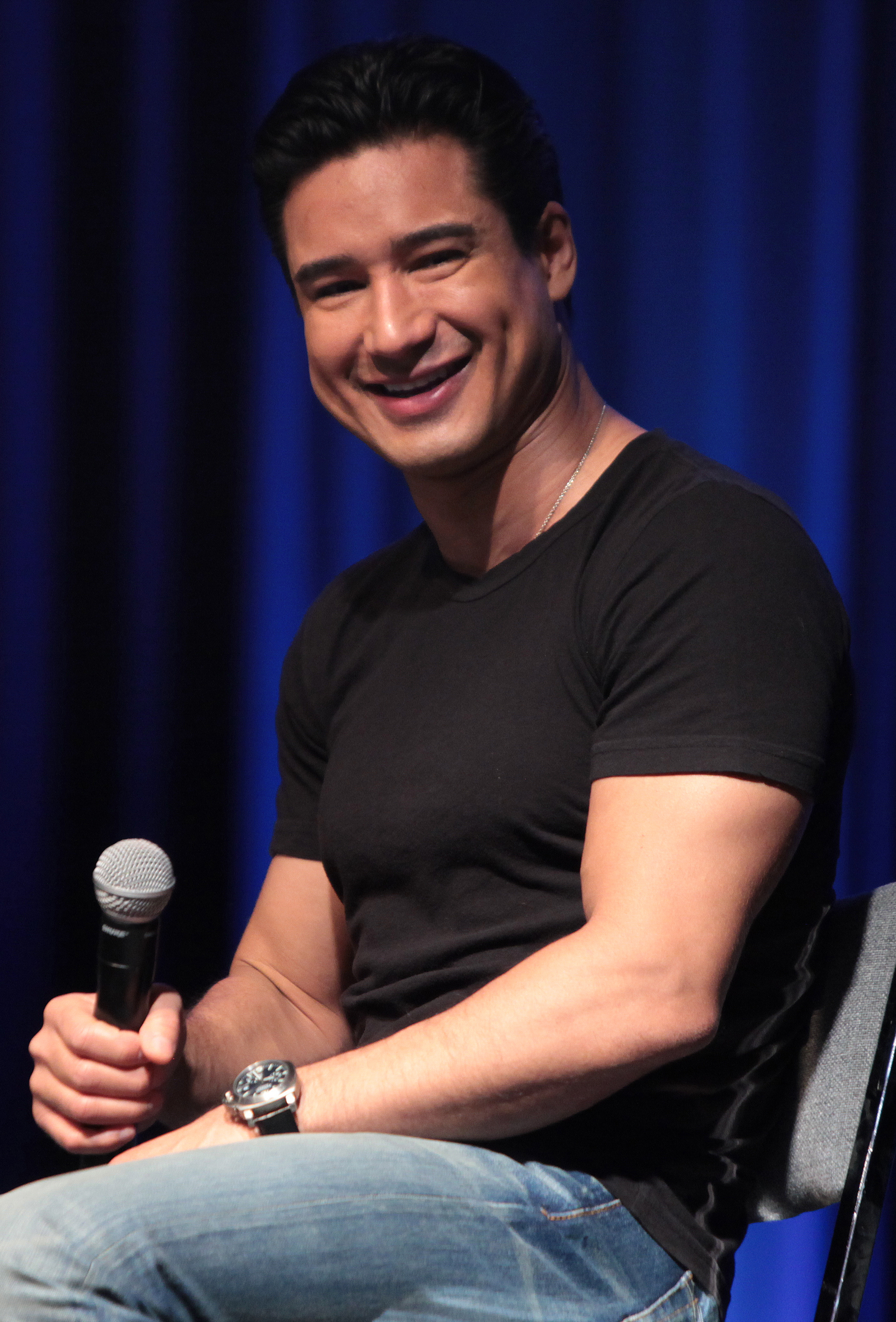
Mario Lopez served as one of the hosts and a presenter during the ceremony

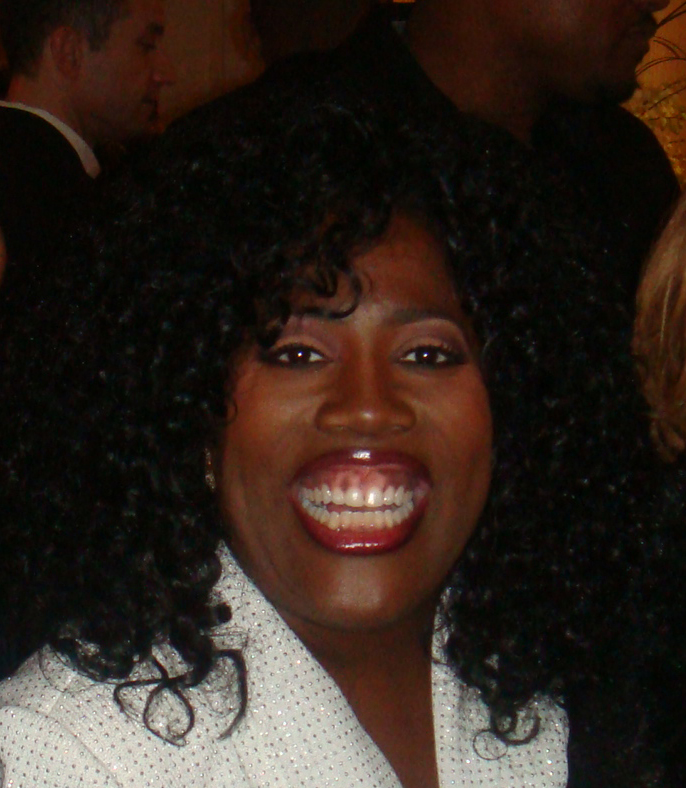
Sheryl Underwood served as one of the host and a presenter during the ceremony

| Name | Role |
|---|---|
| Christian Lanz | Announcer for the 45th Annual Daytime Emmy Awards |
| Debbie Matenopoulos; Mark Steines | Presenters of the award for Outstanding Younger Actress in a Drama Series |
| Gloria Allred | Presenter of the award for Outstanding Legal/Courtroom Program |
| Gaby Natale | Presenter of the special tribute of 35th Anniversary of Wheel of Fortune |
| Adrienne Houghton; Loni Love; Jeannie Mai; Tamera Mowry-Housley | Presenters of the award for Outstanding Guest Performer in a Drama Series |
| Sharon Case; Kristoff St. John | Presenters of the award for Outstanding Talk Show/Informative |
| Sal Stowers; Greg Vaughan | Presenters of the award for Outstanding Drama Series Directing Team |
| Chris Van Etten; Brandon McMillan | Presenter of the award for Outstanding Younger Actor in a Drama Series |
| Finola Hughes; Michelle Stafford | Presenters of the award for Outstanding Culinary Show Host |
| Jamie Farr; Loretta Swit | Presenters of the special tribute of the 55th Anniversary of Mister Rogers' Neighborhood |
| Mario Lopez; Gia Francessca Lopez | Presenters of the awards for Outstanding Entertainment Program in Spanish; Outstanding Morning Program in Spanish, and Outstanding Daytime Talent in a Spanish Language Program |
| Peter Marshall; Tom Bergeron | Presenters of the award for Outstanding Game Show Host and Outstanding Game Show |
| Laura Wright | Presenter of the special tribute of the 55th Anniversary of General Hospital |
| Suzanne Rogers | Presenter of the award for Outstanding Supporting Actress in a Drama Series |
| Molly Burnett; James Bland | Presenters of the award for Outstanding Digital Daytime Drama Series |
| AJ Gibson; Vivica A. Fox | Presenters of the award for Outstanding Morning Program |
| Kellie Pickler; Ben Aaron | Presenters of the award for Outstanding Supporting Actor in a Drama Series |
| Deidre Hall | Presenter of the Lifetime Achievement Award |
| David Osmond; Marie Osmond | Presenters of the award for Outstanding Talk Show/Entertainment |
| Jesse Palmer; Valerie Bertinelli | Presenters of the award for Outstanding Informative Talk Show Host |
| Bradley Bell; Lauralee Bell | Presenters of the special tribute of the 45th Anniversary of The Young and the Restless |
| Kevin Frazier; Nancy O'Dell | Presenters of the award for Outstanding Culinary Program |
| Chuck Dages (NATAS Chairman) | Special presentation highlighting the benefits of daytime television and diversity |
| Mario Lopez | Introducer of Joely Fisher and In Memoriam tribute |
| Katherine Kelly Lang; Rena Sofer; Heather Tom | Presenters of the award for Outstanding Lead Actor in a Drama Series |
| Sara Gilbert; Eve; Julie Chen; Sheryl Underwood | Presenters of the award for Outstanding Entertainment News Program |
| Kristos Andrews; Anne Marie Cummings | Highlighters of the Creative Arts Lifetime Achievement Awards |
| Chris Harrison | Presenter of the award for Outstanding Entertainment Talk Show Host |
| Elizabeth Hubbard; Martha Byrne | Presenters of the award for Outstanding Lead Actress in a Drama Series |
| Jane Pauley | Presenter of the award for Outstanding Drama Series |

=== Performers ===
| Name(s) | Role | Performed |
|---|---|---|
| Caleb Martin & The Remotres | Music Director | Band |
| N/A | Performers/Dancers | "I Gotta Feeling" as opening acts |
| Joely Fisher | Performer | "Astonishing" during the annual In Memoriam tribute |

== In Memoriam ==
Joely Fisher performed "Astonishing" from Little Women as the following people were honored:

- Monty Hall
- Della Reese
- Wendy Drew
- Patti Deutsch
- Harry Eggart
- Carole Hart
- Lin Bolen
- Bud Luckey
- David Ogden Stiers
- Clay Virtue
- Bill Turner
- Mark LaMura
- Ed Greene
- Donnelly Rhodes
- John Morris
- Warren Burton
- Rose Marie
- Jim Czak
- Heather North
- Anne Jeffreys
- Samantha Stone
- Bradford Dillman
- Harry Anderson
- Chuck McCann
- Robert Guillaume
- Charles Bradley
- John Conboy
- Ann Wedgeworth
- Jim Nabors
- Frank Avruch
- June Foray
