= Steve Harvey (talk show) =

American syndicated talk show (2012–2017)

- Genre: Talk show
- Presented by: Steve Harvey
- Country of origin: United States
- Original language: English
- No. of seasons: 5
- No. of episodes: 920

Production
- Executive producers: Alex Duda; Rushion McDonald
- Production locations: NBC Tower; Chicago, Illinois
- Running time: 43 minutes
- Production companies: Beautiful Day Productions LLC; Endemol Shine North America; Nu-Opp, Inc. (2012–2015) (seasons 1–3); E. 112th St. Productions (2015–2017) (seasons 4–5); A Better Machine Productions

Original release
- Network: Syndication
- Release: September 4, 2012 – July 13, 2017

Related
- Steve

Steve Harvey is an American syndicated daytime talk show that ran for five seasons from September 4, 2012, to July 13, 2017, with a total of 920 episodes during its run. It was hosted by comedian and media personality Steve Harvey and taped at the NBC Tower studios in Chicago, Illinois. The show was produced by Endemol Shine North America and distributed by NBCUniversal Television Distribution.

On November 11, 2016, it was announced that Steve Harvey would end at the conclusion of the 2016–17 season. Concurrently, it was announced that Harvey would host a new talk show beginning the following season, Steve, which was produced in Los Angeles in partnership with IMG and NBCUniversal Television Distribution.

== Ratings ==
Out of the five new talk shows to premiere during the 2012–13 television season, Steve Harvey ranked second, behind Katie, but ahead of The Jeff Probst Show, The Ricki Lake Show, and The Trisha Goddard Show. During the week of December 31, 2012, Steve Harvey averaged 1.987 million viewers.

== Awards and nominations ==
Year	Award	Recipient	Result	Ref
2013	People's Choice Award for Favorite New Talk Show Host	Steve Harvey	Won	
2013	Daytime Emmy Award for Outstanding Talk Show Host	Steve Harvey	Nominated	
2014	NAACP Image Award for Outstanding Talk Series	Steve Harvey	Won	
2014	Daytime Emmy Award for Outstanding Talk Show Informative	Steve Harvey	Won	
2015	Daytime Emmy Award for Outstanding Talk Show Informative	Steve Harvey	Won	
2017	Outstanding Informative Talk Show Host	Steve Harvey	Won	
