= List of awards and nominations received by The View =

Since debuting in 1997, The View has garnered numerous awards and honors, among them are 30 Daytime Emmy Awards, which include Outstanding Talk Show and Outstanding Talk Show Host for Whoopi Goldberg, Joy Behar, Sherri Shepherd, Elisabeth Hasselbeck, and Barbara Walters, and 4 NAACP Image Awards. In addition, the show has received nominations for 4 People's Choice Awards, 3 GLAAD Media Awards, and a Critics' Choice Television Award.

== List of wins and nominations ==
Year	Award	Category	Honorees	Result
1998	Daytime Emmy Award	Outstanding Talk Show	Barbara Walters, Bill Geddie	Nominated
1998	Daytime Emmy Award	Outstanding Talk Show Host	Meredith Vieira, Star Jones, Joy Behar, Debbie Matenopoulos, Walters	Nominated
1998	Daytime Emmy Award	Outstanding Directing in a Talk Show / Entertainment News or Morning Program	Mark Gentile	Won
1998	Daytime Emmy Award	Outstanding Technical Direction / Electronic Camera / Video Control	Rene M. Butler, Frank Cocchia, Reggie Drakeford, Jodi Dresch, Russ Fortier, Eric Johnson, Adam Keith, Eric Kendra Sr., Carlos Rios, Nicholas Besink	Won
1998	Daytime Emmy Award	Outstanding Lighting Direction	Candice Dunn	Nominated
1998	Daytime Emmy Award	Outstanding Live and Direct to Tape Sound Mixing	Larry Kaltenbach, Tim Pankewicz, Victor Pardo, Carla Nation Reed, Vann Weller	Nominated
1998	Daytime Emmy Award	Outstanding Hairstyling	Deirdre Flaherty, Marque, Bryant Renfroe	Won
1998	Daytime Emmy Award	Outstanding Makeup	Alan Cutler, Karim Orange	Nominated
1999	Daytime Emmy Award	Outstanding Talk Show	Walters, Geddie	Nominated
1999	Daytime Emmy Award	Outstanding Talk Show Host	Vieira, Jones, Behar, Matenopoulos, Walters	Nominated
1999	Daytime Emmy Award	Outstanding Directing in a Talk Show / Entertainment News or Morning Program	Gentile	Nominated
1999	Daytime Emmy Award	Outstanding Technical Direction / Electronic Camera / Video Control	Rene M. Butler, Richard Cavaliere, Frank Cocchia, Reggie Drakeford, Russ Fortier, Rich Freedman, Eric Johnson, EricKendra Sr., Carlos Rios, Stan Talarek, Trevor Thompson, Nicholas Besink	Nominated
1999	Daytime Emmy Award	Outstanding Lighting Direction	Dunn	Nominated
1999	Daytime Emmy Award	Outstanding Achievement in Art Direction / Set Decoration / Scenic Design	William Mickley	Nominated
1999	Daytime Emmy Award	Outstanding Special Class Writing	Beverly Kopf, Christian McKiernan, Andrew Smith	Nominated
1999	Daytime Emmy Award	Outstanding Costume Design / Styling	Fran Taylor	Nominated
1999	Daytime Emmy Award	Outstanding Hairstyling	Flaherty, Marque, Renfroe	Won
1999	Daytime Emmy Award	Outstanding Makeup	Cutler, Lori Klein, Orange, Eve Pearl	Nominated
2000	Daytime Emmy Award	Outstanding Talk Show	Walters, Geddie	Nominated
2000	Daytime Emmy Award	Outstanding Talk Show Host	Vieira, Jones, Behar, Lisa Ling, Walters	Nominated
2000	Daytime Emmy Award	Outstanding Directing in a Talk Show / Entertainment News or Morning Program	Gentile	Nominated
2000	Daytime Emmy Award	Outstanding Technical Direction / Electronic Camera / Video Control	Rene M. Butler, Rich Cavaliere, Frank Cocchia, Reggie Drakeford, Russ Fortier, Rich Freedman, Eric Johnson, Carlos Rios, Michael Rodriguez, Thompson, Nicholas Besink	Won
2000	Daytime Emmy Award	Outstanding Lighting Direction	Dunn	Nominated
2000	Daytime Emmy Award	Outstanding Achievement in Art Direction / Set Decoration / Scenic Design	Mickley	Nominated
2000	Daytime Emmy Award	Outstanding Achievement in Main Title Design	Ken Davis, Randy Pyburn, Kieran Walsh	Nominated
2000	Daytime Emmy Award	Outstanding Live and Direct to Tape Sound Mixing	Pankewicz, Sorrento, John Venable, Weller	Won
2000	Daytime Emmy Award	Outstanding Special Class Writing	Kopf, McKiernan, Smith	Nominated
2000	Daytime Emmy Award	Outstanding Costume Design / Styling	Taylor	Nominated
2000	Daytime Emmy Award	Outstanding Hairstyling	Flaherty, Marque, Renfroe	Won
2000	Daytime Emmy Award	Outstanding Makeup	Cutler, Klein, Pearl	Nominated
2001	Daytime Emmy Award	Outstanding Talk Show	Walters, Geddie	Nominated
2001	Daytime Emmy Award	Outstanding Talk Show Host	Vieira, Jones, Behar, Ling, Walters	Nominated
2001	Daytime Emmy Award	Outstanding Directing in a Talk Show / Entertainment News or Morning Program	Gentile	Nominated
2001	Daytime Emmy Award	Outstanding Technical Direction / Electronic Camera / Video Control	Rene M.Butler, Rich Cavaliere, Frank Cocchia, Reginald Drakeford, Russ Fortier, Rich Freedman, Glenn Friedman, Eric Johnson, Trevor Thompson	Nominated
2001	Daytime Emmy Award	Outstanding Lighting Direction	Dunn	Won
2001	Daytime Emmy Award	Outstanding Achievement in Art Direction / Set Decoration / Scenic Design	Mickley	Nominated
2001	Daytime Emmy Award	Outstanding Special Class Writing	Kopf, McKiernan, Julie Segel, Smith	Won
2001	Daytime Emmy Award	Outstanding Costume Design / Styling	Taylor	Nominated
2001	Daytime Emmy Award	Outstanding Hairstyling	Flaherty, Marque, Renfroe	Won
2001	Daytime Emmy Award	Outstanding Makeup	Cutler, Klein, Pearl	Won
2002	Daytime Emmy Award	Outstanding Talk Show	Walters, Geddie	Nominated
2002	Daytime Emmy Award	Outstanding Talk Show Host	Vieira, Jones, Behar, Ling, Walters	Nominated
2002	Daytime Emmy Award	Outstanding Directing in a Talk Show / Entertainment News or Morning Program	Gentile	Nominated
2002	Daytime Emmy Award	Outstanding Technical Direction / Electronic Camera / Video Control	Rene M. Butler, Rich Cavaliere, Frank Cocchia, Reginald Drakeford, Russ Fortier, Rich Freedman, Friedman, Eric Johnson, Trevor Thompson, Nicholas Besink	Nominated
2002	Daytime Emmy Award	Outstanding Lighting Direction	Dunn	Nominated
2002	Daytime Emmy Award	Outstanding Special Class Writing	McKiernan, Siegel, Smith	Nominated
2002	Daytime Emmy Award	Outstanding Live and Direct to Tape Sound Mixing	Jack Kestenbaum, Pankewicz, John Sorrento, Weller	Won
2002	Daytime Emmy Award	Outstanding Costume Design / Styling	Taylor	Nominated
2002	Daytime Emmy Award	Outstanding Hairstyling	Flaherty, Marque, Renfroe	Won
2002	Daytime Emmy Award	Outstanding Makeup	Elena George, Klein, Pearl	Won
2003	Daytime Emmy Award	Outstanding Talk Show	Walters, Geddie	Won
2003	Daytime Emmy Award	Outstanding Talk Show Host	Vieira, Jones, Behar, Ling, Walters	Nominated
2003	Daytime Emmy Award	Outstanding Directing in a Talk Show / Entertainment News or Morning Program	Gentile	Nominated
2003	Daytime Emmy Award	Outstanding Technical Direction / Electronic Camera / Video Control	Rene M. Butler, Rich Cavaliere, Frank Cocchia, Reginald Drakeford, Russ Fortier, Rich Freedman, Friedman, Eric Johnson, Trevor Thompson	Nominated
2003	Daytime Emmy Award	Outstanding Lighting Direction	Dunn	Nominated
2003	Daytime Emmy Award	Outstanding Special Class Writing	McKiernan, Siegel, Smith	Nominated
2003	Daytime Emmy Award	Outstanding Live and Direct to Tape Sound Mixing	Edward J. Garofalo Jr., Dominick Maldari, Pankewicz, Weller	Nominated
2003	Daytime Emmy Award	Outstanding Costume Design / Styling	Taylor	Nominated
2003	Daytime Emmy Award	Outstanding Hairstyling	Flaherty, Renfroe, Lavette Slater	Nominated
2003	Daytime Emmy Award	Outstanding Makeup	George, Klein, Pearl	Won
2004	Daytime Emmy Award	Outstanding Talk Show	Walters, Geddie	Nominated
2004	Daytime Emmy Award	Outstanding Talk Show Host	Vieira, Jones, Behar, Elisabeth Hasselbeck, Walters	Nominated
2004	Daytime Emmy Award	Outstanding Directing in a Talk Show / Entertainment News or Morning Program	Gentile	Won
2004	Daytime Emmy Award	Outstanding Technical Direction / Electronic Camera / Video Control	Rene M. Butler, Rich Cavaliere, Frank Cocchia, Reggie Drakeford, Russ Fortier, Ric Freedman, Eric Kendra Sr., George Montanez, Trevor Thompson, Nicholas Besink	Nominated
2004	Daytime Emmy Award	Outstanding Lighting Direction	Dunn	Won
2004	Daytime Emmy Award	Outstanding Achievement in Art Direction / Set Decoration / Scenic Design	René Lagler, Mickley	Nominated
2004	Daytime Emmy Award	Outstanding Live and Direct to Tape Sound Mixing	Garofalo Jr., Maldari, Pankewicz, Weller	Nominated
2004	Daytime Emmy Award	Outstanding Special Class Writing	McKiernan, Siegel, Smith	Nominated
2004	Daytime Emmy Award	Outstanding Costume Design / Styling	Taylor	Nominated
2004	Daytime Emmy Award	Outstanding Hairstyling	Flaherty, Renfroe, Slater	Nominated
2004	Daytime Emmy Award	Outstanding Makeup	George, Klein, Pearl	Nominated
2005	Daytime Emmy Award	Outstanding Talk Show	Walters, Geddie	Nominated
2005	Daytime Emmy Award	Outstanding Talk Show Host	Vieira, Jones, Behar, Hasselbeck, Walters	Nominated
2005	Daytime Emmy Award	Outstanding Directing in a Talk Show / Entertainment News or Morning Program	Gentile	Nominated
2005	Daytime Emmy Award	Outstanding Achievement in Art Direction / Set Decoration / Scenic Design	Mickley	Nominated
2005	Daytime Emmy Award	Outstanding Technical Direction / Electronic Camera / Video Control	Rene M. Butler, Rich Cavaliere, Frank Cocchia, Reginald Drakeford, Russ Fortier, Rich Freedman, Eric Kendra Sr., Denis Linehan, Trevor Thompson, Nicholas Besink	Won
2005	Daytime Emmy Award	Outstanding Lighting Direction	Dunn	Nominated
2005	Daytime Emmy Award	Outstanding Special Class Writing	McKiernan, Siegel, Smith	Nominated
2005	Daytime Emmy Award	Outstanding Single Camera Editing	Rich Provost	Nominated
2005	Daytime Emmy Award	Outstanding Live and Direct to Tape Sound Mixing	Garofalo Jr., Maldari, Pankewicz, Weller	Nominated
2005	Daytime Emmy Award	Outstanding Hairstyling	Flaherty, Renfroe, Slater	Nominated
2005	Daytime Emmy Award	Outstanding Makeup	Rebecca Borman, George, Klein, Pearl	Nominated
2006	Daytime Emmy Award	Outstanding Talk Show	Walters, Geddie	Nominated
2006	Daytime Emmy Award	Outstanding Talk Show Host	Vieira, Jones, Behar, Hasselbeck, Walters	Nominated
2006	Daytime Emmy Award	Outstanding Directing in a Talk Show / Entertainment News or Morning Program	Gentile	Nominated
2006	Daytime Emmy Award	Outstanding Technical Direction / Electronic Camera / Video Control	Rene M. Butler, Rich Cavaliere, Greg Ciccone, Frank Cocchia, Reginald Drakeford, Russ Fortier, Rich Freedman, Glen Friedman, Eric Kendra Sr., Denis Linehan, Trevor Thompson, Peter Blumenthal, Nicholas Besink	Nominated
2006	Daytime Emmy Award	Outstanding Lighting Direction	Dunn	Nominated
2006	Daytime Emmy Award	Outstanding Single Camera Editing	Provost	Nominated
2006	Daytime Emmy Award	Outstanding Live and Direct to Tape Sound Mixing	Garofalo Jr., Hefter, Pankewicz, Weller	Nominated
2006	Daytime Emmy Award	Outstanding Costume Design / Styling	Taylor	Nominated
2006	Daytime Emmy Award	Outstanding Hairstyling	Renfroe, Slater, Deirdre Stadtmauer	Nominated
2006	Daytime Emmy Award	Outstanding Makeup	Borman, Karen Dupiche, George, Klein, Pearl	Won
2007	Daytime Emmy Award	Outstanding Talk Show	Walters, Geddie	Nominated
2007	Daytime Emmy Award	Outstanding Talk Show Host	Rosie O'Donnell, Behar, Hasselbeck, Walters	Nominated
2007	Daytime Emmy Award	Outstanding Directing in a Talk Show / Entertainment News or Morning Program	Gentile	Nominated
2007	Daytime Emmy Award	Outstanding Technical Direction / Electronic Camera / Video Control	Rene M. Butler, Frank Cocchia, Reginald Drakeford, Russ Fortier, Rich Freedman, Eric Kendra Sr., Denis Linehan, Trevor Thompson, Peter Blumenthal	Nominated
2007	Daytime Emmy Award	Outstanding Lighting Direction	Dunn	Nominated
2007	Daytime Emmy Award	Outstanding Single Camera Editing	Provost	Nominated
2007	Daytime Emmy Award	Outstanding Live and Direct to Tape Sound Mixing	Garofalo Jr., Peter Hefter, Pankewicz, Weller	Nominated
2007	Daytime Emmy Award	Outstanding Costume Design / Styling	Taylor	Nominated
2007	Daytime Emmy Award	Outstanding Hairstyling	Renfroe, Judy Mar, Slater, Stadtmauer	Won
2007	Daytime Emmy Award	Outstanding Makeup	Borman, Klein, Pearl	Won
2008	Daytime Emmy Award	Outstanding Talk Show	Walters, Geddie	Nominated
2008	Daytime Emmy Award	Outstanding Talk Show Host	Whoopi Goldberg, Behar, Sherri Shepherd, Hasselbeck, Walters	Nominated
2008	Daytime Emmy Award	Outstanding Directing in a Talk Show / Entertainment News or Morning Program	Gentile	Nominated
2008	Daytime Emmy Award	Outstanding Lighting Direction	Dunn	Nominated
2008	Daytime Emmy Award	Outstanding Special Class Writing	Janette Barber, McKiernan, Smith	Won
2008	Daytime Emmy Award	Outstanding Hairstyling	Renfroe, Mar, Slater	Won
2008	Daytime Emmy Award	Outstanding Makeup	Borman, Dupiche, Klein	Nominated
2009	Daytime Emmy Award	Outstanding Talk Show Host	Goldberg, Behar, Shepherd, Hasselbeck, Walters	Won
2009	Daytime Emmy Award	Outstanding Directing in a Talk Show / Entertainment News or Morning Program	Gentile	Won
2009	Daytime Emmy Award	Outstanding Lighting Direction	Dunn	Nominated
2009	Daytime Emmy Award	Outstanding Art Direction / Set Decoration / Scenic Design	Michael Deegan	Nominated
2009	Daytime Emmy Award	Outstanding Multiple Camera Editing	Provost	Nominated
2009	Daytime Emmy Award	Outstanding Hairstyling	Rose Amoedo, Renfroe, Slater	Won
2009	Daytime Emmy Award	Outstanding Makeup	Rebecca Borman, Karen Dupiche, Lori Klein	Won
2009	NAACP Image Award	Outstanding Talk Series	Walters, Geddie	Won
2010	Daytime Emmy Award	Outstanding Talk Show Host	Goldberg, Behar, Shepherd, Hasselbeck, Walters	Nominated
2010	Daytime Emmy Award	Outstanding Lighting Direction	Dunn	Nominated
2010	Daytime Emmy Award	Outstanding Art Direction / Set Decoration / Scenic Design	Deegan	Nominated
2010	Daytime Emmy Award	Outstanding Hairstyling	Amoedo, Renfroe, Slater	Nominated
2010	Daytime Emmy Award	Outstanding Makeup	Borman, Dupiche, Klein	Won
2010	NAACP Image Award	Outstanding Talk Series	Walters, Geddie	Nominated
2011	Daytime Emmy Award	Outstanding Talk Show / Entertainment	Walters, Geddie	Nominated
2011	Daytime Emmy Award	Outstanding Talk Show Host	Goldberg, Behar, Shepherd, Hasselbeck, Walters	Nominated
2011	Daytime Emmy Award	Outstanding Directing in a Talk Show / Entertainment News or Morning Program	Gentile	Nominated
2011	Daytime Emmy Award	Outstanding Lighting Direction	Dunn	Won
2011	Daytime Emmy Award	Outstanding Hairstyling	Amoedo, Renfroe, Slater	Nominated
2011	Daytime Emmy Award	Outstanding Makeup	Borman, Dupiche, Klein	Nominated
2011	NAACP Image Award	Outstanding Talk Series	Walters, Geddie	Won
2012	Daytime Emmy Award	Outstanding Talk Show / Entertainment	Walters, Geddie	Nominated
2012	Daytime Emmy Award	Outstanding Directing in a Talk Show / Entertainment News or Morning Program	Gentile, John F. Keegan, Rob Naylor	Nominated
2012	Daytime Emmy Award	Outstanding Technical Direction / Electronic Camera / Video Control	Rene M. Butler, Parker Bell, Buck Buchanan, Frank Cocchia, Reginald Drakeford, Manny Gutierrez, Eric Johnson, Eric Kendra Sr., John Pry, Taylor Dees	Nominated
2012	Daytime Emmy Award	Outstanding Lighting Direction	James Gallagher	Nominated
2012	Daytime Emmy Award	Outstanding Live and Direct to Tape Sound Mixing	Chuck Eisen, Rob Gigliuto, Michael Glazier, Hefter, Chris Murphy, Greg Thompson	Nominated
2012	Daytime Emmy Award	Outstanding Makeup	Borman, Dupiche, Klein	Nominated
2012	People's Choice Award	Favorite Daytime TV Host	Goldberg, Behar, Shepherd, Hasselbeck, Walters	Nominated
2012	NAACP Image Award	Outstanding Talk Series	Walters, Geddie	Nominated
2012	Critics' Choice Television Award	Best Talk Show	Walters, Geddie	Nominated
2013	Daytime Emmy Award	Outstanding Talk Show / Entertainment	Walters, Geddie	Nominated
2013	Daytime Emmy Award	Outstanding Lighting Direction	Gallagher	Nominated
2013	Daytime Emmy Award	Outstanding Live and Direct to Tape Sound Mixing	Eisen, Gigliuto, Glazier, Hefter, Joe Hipp, R.J. Osterhaudt, Thompson	Nominated
2013	People's Choice Award	Favorite New Talk Show Host	Jenny McCarthy	Nominated
2013	NAACP Image Award	Outstanding Talk Series	Walters, Geddie	Won
2014	Daytime Emmy Award	Outstanding Talk Show / Entertainment	Walters, Geddie	Nominated
2014	Daytime Emmy Award	Outstanding Talk Show Host	Goldberg, McCarthy, Shepherd, Walters	Nominated
2015	Daytime Emmy Award	Outstanding Multiple Camera Editing	Provost	Nominated
2015	Daytime Emmy Award	Outstanding Hairstyling	Amoedo, Yancy Edwards, Renfroe, Sabina Rojas	Nominated
2015	NAACP Image Award	Outstanding Talk Series	Walters, Bill Wolff	Nominated
2015	GLAAD Media Award	Outstanding Talk Show Episode	"Laverne Cox discusses 'The T Word'"	Nominated
2016	People's Choice Award	Favorite Daytime TV Hosting Team	Behar, Candace Cameron Bure, Michelle Collins, Paula Faris, Goldberg, Raven-Symoné	Nominated
2016	Daytime Emmy Award	Outstanding Talk Show / Entertainment	Walters, Wolff, Candi Carter, Brian Teta	Nominated
2016	Daytime Emmy Award	Outstanding Entertainment Talk Show Host	Behar, Bure, Collins, Faris, Goldberg, Raven-Symoné, Rosie Perez, Nicolle Wallace	Nominated
2016	Daytime Emmy Award	Outstanding Makeup	Borman, Lynette Broom, Dupiche	Nominated
2017	People's Choice Award	Favorite Daytime TV Hosting Team	Behar, Bure, Collins, Faris, Goldberg, Sara Haines, Raven-Symoné	Nominated
2017	NAACP Image Award	Outstanding Talk Series	Walters, Carter, Teta	Nominated
2017	Daytime Emmy Award	Outstanding Talk Show / Entertainment	Walters, Hilary Estey McLoughlin, Carter, Teta	Nominated
2017	Daytime Emmy Award	Outstanding Entertainment Talk Show Host	Behar, Jedediah Bila, Bure, Faris, Goldberg, Haines, Sunny Hostin, Raven-Symoné	Nominated
2017	Daytime Emmy Award	Outstanding Lighting Direction	Gallagher	Nominated
2017	Daytime Emmy Award	Outstanding Hairstyling	Amoedo, Derick Monroe, Dora Smagler	Nominated
2017	Daytime Emmy Award	Outstanding Makeup	Borman, Broom, Dupiche	Nominated
2018	NAACP Image Award	Outstanding Talk Series	Walters, Estey McLoughlin, Carter, Teta	Nominated
2018	GLAAD Media Award	Outstanding Talk Show Episode	"Laverne Cox and Gavin Grimm"	Nominated
2018	Daytime Emmy Award	Outstanding Talk Show / Entertainment	Walters, Estey McLoughlin, Carter, Teta	Nominated
2018	Daytime Emmy Award	Outstanding Entertainment Talk Show Host	Behar, Bila, Faris, Goldberg, Haines, Hostin, Meghan McCain	Nominated
2018	Daytime Emmy Award	Outstanding Musical Performance in a Daytime Program	Common, Andra Day	Nominated
2018	Daytime Emmy Award	Outstanding Costume Design / Styling	Taylor	Nominated
2018	Gracie Awards	Outstanding Talk Show - Entertainment	Walters, Estey McLoughlin, Carter, Teta	Won
2019	NAACP Image Award	Outstanding Talk Series	Walters, Estey McLoughlin, Carter, Teta	Nominated
2019	Daytime Emmy Award	Outstanding Entertainment Talk Show	Walters, Estey McLoughlin, Carter, Teta	Nominated
2019	Daytime Emmy Award	Outstanding Entertainment Talk Show Host	Behar, Goldberg, Haines, Hostin, Abby Huntsman, McCain	Nominated
2019	Daytime Emmy Award	Outstanding Daytime Promotional Announcement - Topical	Alan Ives	Nominated
2019	Daytime Emmy Award	Outstanding Directing for a Talk Show, Entertainment News or Morning Program	Sarah de la O	Nominated
2019	Daytime Emmy Award	Outstanding Hairstyling	Amoedo, Monroe, Smagler	Nominated
2019	Daytime Emmy Award	Outstanding Makeup	Borman, Broom, Dupiche	Nominated
2019	People's Choice Awards	The Daytime Talk Show	Walters, Estey McLoughlin, Carter, Teta	Nominated
2020	NAACP Image Award	Outstanding Host in a Talk or News/Information (Series or Special) - Individual or Ensemble	Behar, Goldberg, Hostin, Huntsman, McCain, Ana Navarro	Nominated
2020	GLAAD Media Award	Outstanding Variety or Talk Show Episode	"Billy Porter Serves Cataract Realness, Fashion, and Tonys"	Nominated
2020	47th Daytime Emmy Awards	Outstanding Informative Talk Show	Walters, Estey McLoughlin, Teta	Won
2020	47th Daytime Emmy Awards	Outstanding Informative Talk Show Host	Behar, Goldberg, Hostin, Huntsman, McCain, Navarro	Nominated
2020	47th Daytime Emmy Awards	Outstanding Makeup	Borman, Broom, Dupiche	Nominated
2020	47th Daytime Emmy Awards	Outstanding Hairstyling	Amoedo, Monroe, Smagler	Nominated
2020	47th Daytime Emmy Awards	Outstanding Lighting	James Gallagher	Nominated
2020	47th Daytime Emmy Awards	Outstanding Technical Team, Camera Work, Video Rene M. Butler, Michael Danisi, Nick Davis, Donato Depasquale, Rob Feder, Gary Jelaso, Douglas Schneider, Andrew Capuano, Hardy Kluender, John Kokinis		Nominated
2020	47th Daytime Emmy Awards	Outstanding Multiple Camera Editing	Rich Provost	Nominated
2020	47th Daytime Emmy Awards	Outstanding Art Direction		Nominated
2021	48th Daytime Emmy Awards	Outstanding Live and Direct to Tape Sound Mixing		Nominated
2022	49th Daytime Emmy Awards	Outstanding Informative Talk Show Host	Behar, Goldberg, Haines, Hostin, McCain, Navarro	Nominated
2022	49th Daytime Emmy Awards	Outstanding Directing Team for a Multiple Camera Daytime Non-Fiction Program	Sarah de la O, John Keegan, Janean Elkins, Craig Viechec, Christopher Wayne, Dawn DiCicco, Rob Bruce Baron, Paul Tarascio	Nominated
2022	49th Daytime Emmy Awards	Outstanding Lighting Direction	James Gallagher	Nominated
2022	49th Daytime Emmy Awards	Outstanding Technical Team, Camera Work, Video	Rene M. Butler, Michael Danisi, Nick Davis, Donato Depasquale, Rob Feder, Gary Jelaso, Douglas Schneider, Andrew Capuano, Hardy Kluender, Nicholas Fayo, David Dainoff, John Kokinis	Nominated
2022	49th Daytime Emmy Awards	Outstanding Main Title and Graphic Design	de la O, Alan Ives, Michael Vamosy, Andrew Maercklein, Viechec, Thomas Papesca, Amy Caspare, Kristen Cunningham, Halli Rosin, Mike Cahill, Brian Castleforte	Nominated
2022	49th Daytime Emmy Awards	Outstanding Art Direction/Set Decoration/Scenic Design	Mark Erbaugh	Nominated
2022	49th Daytime Emmy Awards	Outstanding Hairstyling	Derick Monroe, Dora Smagler, Rosa Amoedo, Matthew Yates, Joedson Gomes	Nominated
2022	49th Daytime Emmy Awards	Outstanding Makeup	Rebecca Borman, Lynette Broom, Karen Dupiche, Veronica Ibarra	Nominated
2022	49th Daytime Emmy Awards	Outstanding Special Effects Costumes, Makeup and Hairstyling	Sam Hill, Nicolas Putvinski, Fran Taylor, Ashley Alderfer-Kaufman, Monroe, Dora Smagler, Gomes, Yates, Borman, Dupiche, Broom, Ibarra, Kyle Krueger	Nominated
