= Ice & Coco =

- Genre: Talk show
- Presented by: Ice-T; Coco Austin
- Country of origin: United States
- Original language: English
- No. of seasons: 1
- No. of episodes: 15

Production
- Executive producer: Candi Carter
- Camera setup: Multi-camera
- Running time: 43 minutes
- Production companies: New Chapter Entertainment; Final Level Productions; Telepictures

Original release
- Network: Syndication
- Release: August 3 – August 21, 2015

Ice & Coco is an American syndicated entertainment talk show hosted by Ice-T and Coco Austin. The series premiered on August 3, 2015, and received a three-week test run.

== See also ==
- Ice Loves Coco
