= WMUH =

Radio station at Muhlenberg College in Allentown, Pennsylvania

Coordinates: 40.598°N 75.510°W

- Allentown, Pennsylvania; United States
- Broadcast area: Lehigh Valley
- Frequency: 91.7 MHz
- Branding: 91.7 WMUH

Programming
- Format: Freeform college radio

Ownership
- Owner: Muhlenberg College

History
- First air date: 1948
- Call sign meaning: W M U Hlenberg

Technical information
- Licensing authority: FCC
- Facility ID: 46947
- Class: A
- ERP: 440 Watts
- HAAT: -1 meters

Links
- Public license information: Public file; LMS
- Website: wmuh.org

WMUH (91.7 FM) is a college radio station, supported through Muhlenberg College, located in Allentown, Pennsylvania, in the Lehigh Valley region of eastern Pennsylvania.

In 2000, WMUH was named one of the top 20 college radio stations by The Princeton Review. That same year, WMUH was named the best radio station in the Lehigh Valley (including commercial stations) by the Lehigh Valley Music Awards Association.

== History ==
The station began broadcasting in 1948 at 640 AM, but could only be heard on the Muhlenberg campus. This continued until 1964, when Muhlenberg received an FCC broadcast license for an FM station on 89.7. However, WMUH's reach was still primarily the Muhlenberg campus.

This changed in 1979, when WMUH received a power increase of 440 watts, moved over to 91.7 FM, and could be heard throughout the Lehigh Valley.

In 1982, WMUH began broadcasting for the first time at 24 hours a day, seven days a week. This was primarily accomplished with community volunteers and recently graduated ex-WMUH disc jockeys covering the overnights from 2AM - 6AM.

In the 1980s, WMUH launched the station's slogan "the only station that matters," which is still in use to this day, and was a take-off on the phrase, "the only band that matters," which was used in England to describe The Clash during that period.

== Notable alumni ==
- David Fricke, senior editor, Rolling Stone
- Brian Teta, executive producer, The View

== See also ==
- Media in the Lehigh Valley
- List of college radio stations in the United States
