= Unforgettable (1996 film) =

- Theatrical release poster
- Directed by: John Dahl
- Written by: Bill Geddie; John Dahl (Uncredited); Rick Dahl (Uncredited)
- Produced by: Dino De Laurentiis; Martha Schumacher
- Starring: Ray Liotta; Linda Fiorentino; Peter Coyote; Christopher McDonald; David Paymer
- Cinematography: Jeff Jur
- Edited by: Eric L. Beason; Scott Chestnut
- Music by: Christopher Young
- Production companies: Metro-Goldwyn-Mayer Pictures; Dino De Laurentiis Company; Spelling Films
- Distributed by: MGM/UA Distribution Co.
- Release date: February 23, 1996
- Running time: 117 minutes
- Country: United States
- Language: English
- Budget: $18 million
- Box office: $2,821,671 (USA)

Unforgettable is a 1996 science fiction thriller film directed by John Dahl and starring Ray Liotta and Linda Fiorentino. The film is about a man named David Krane (Liotta), who is obsessed with finding out who murdered his wife.

John Dahl's follow up to his critically acclaimed 1994 film, The Last Seduction, Unforgettable was a critical and box office failure, only earning less than $3 million in the United States.

== Plot ==
During an apparent drug store robbery, a woman is murdered. Seattle Medical Examiner Dr. David Krane finds a matchbook there that reminds him of one found at the scene of his wife Mary's murder. Krane is convinced that the same killer was behind the two crimes.

Meanwhile, Dr. Martha Briggs has created a serum designed to transfer memories via samples of Cerebral Spinal Fluid (CSF). Krane wants to volunteer to try it, but Briggs refuses.

Krane later retrieves a sample of CSF from Mary's autopsy, and then breaks into Briggs' office. At his house, Krane injects himself with the serum, and has a memory flash of the night of the murder, but cannot see the killer's face. Krane then retrieves the CSF from the victim at the drug store. Using the serum again, he manages to see the killer's face. With a police artist, he creates a sketch of the killer.

Briggs later confronts Krane about the theft of her serum. She is worried about side effects, eventually noticing that it has been damaging Krane's heart. Entering the sketch into a computer program, Krane's colleague Curtis Avery identifies the suspect as Eddie Dutton, who has a criminal history, including drugs and murders for hire. Curtis gives Krane Eddie's last known address: a motel.

There, Krane sees Eddie and has an overreaction. He runs after Eddie, who starts firing a gun. In the ensuing fight, Krane ends up with Eddie's gun. Eddie runs into a church, and grabs a kid, holding him hostage with a knife. Krane tries to talk Eddie down when the police arrive. Eventually, Detective Don Bresler shoots Eddie dead.

Because of his erratic behavior, Krane gets fired. He later sneaks into the autopsy room and steals a sample of Eddie's CSF.

With it, Krane uses the serum agaim. He has a flash of someone having sex with Mary. In the midst of the flashback, Krane inadvertently begins to choke Briggs. Apparently, before Mary died, someone noticed Krane returning to the house and fled. Briggs administers nitroglycerin to Krane, who explains that Eddie did not kill Mary. Krane reveals that he used to be a drunk and his marriage was on the rocks. He had come home drunk that night and passed out in the front yard while Mary was being murdered. She was five weeks pregnant when this happened.

The next morning, Briggs asks Curtis to get a DNA sample from Krane. She then runs the DNA for a paternity test, which shows the baby was not Krane's.

Krane confronts Mary's sister Kelly. She confesses that Mary was having an affair with a detective. While investigating this further, Krane begins to have more of Eddie's flashbacks and has a heart attack. Krane is rushed to the hospital, where he has flashbacks of the night of Mary's murder. While he and Briggs are at the hospital, an explosive device destroys her office.

Stewart Gleick, the original detective on Mary's case, later approaches Krane, saying that Detective Joseph Bodner may be the man with whom Mary was involved and thus the father of her unborn child. Bodner tried to commit suicide on the same day Mary died, but ended up in a coma instead. Krane and Briggs go to the hospice where Bodner is and take a sample of his CSF. The duo then argue about who should take the injection. Not taking any chances, Krane tapes Briggs to a seat and uses the serum. He confirms that his wife was in fact having an affair with Bodner. She met Bodner while being a witness against Bresler, who is revealed to have been corrupt.

As Krane relives these memories, Bresler arrives and decides to kill him and Briggs by lighting a fire. Just as Bresler is about to kill them, Kelly arrives at the house with Krane's kids. Krane beats Bresler unconscious and saves him and Briggs from the fire. He then goes back into the burning house to retrieve the microcassette recorder that recorded Bresler's confession.

While Bresler is arrested, Krane ends up in a coma, imagining he is with Mary and his kids. In the last few moments of the movie, he looks back over his shoulder and his wife fades away. As Dr. Martha Briggs had just told the visiting detective, it was not Krane's physical condition but rather his "mental state" that was the real cause of his coma. Thus, those last moments in Krane's mind indicate that he has finally let go of Mary and is now ready to return to his kids in real life.

== Cast ==
- Ray Liotta as Dr. David Krane
- Linda Fiorentino as Dr. Martha Briggs
- Peter Coyote as Don Bresler
- Christopher McDonald as Stewart Gleick
- Kim Coates as Eddie Dutton
- David Paymer as Curtis Avery
- Kim Cattrall as Kelly
- William B. Davis as Dr. Smoot

== Production ==
In November 1994, it was reported that John Dahl's next film would either be to rewrite Bill Geddie's script Unforgettable with his brother Rick for producer Dino De Laurentiis or a loose remake of Niagara titled When She Was Good updated for the 90s to include issues of spousal abuse and white-collar crime. Dahl was intrigued by the film's mashup of being both a thriller and horror film feeling that it would give him the opportunity to put his own spin on the formula of Dr Jekyll and Mr Hyde. Linda Fiorentino was also intrigued by the prospect of playing a "science nerd" which she considered a welcome break from the femme fatale roles she had played in The Last Seduction and Jade that she found were becoming too rote for her.

=== Filming ===
Ray Liotta told an interviewer some anecdotes about filming in the morgue:

Q. Since you spend a fair amount of time in the morgue in Unforgettable, do you have any crazy coroner's tales to relate?

A. The morgue in L.A. was horrible, scary. The smell is just unbelievable. A couple of people who work there wanted to take pictures. So they took photos with bodies behind me.

Q. You mean, they took photos of you, Ray Liotta, the movie star, in the city morgue?

A. Yeah, that happened to me in two other rather strange places. For Unlawful Entry, these cops were looking for a body part. I was on-call with them, and so sure enough, they took a photograph of me with the body bag in the background. With Article 99, I played a surgeon. I did some research on open-heart surgery, and the nurses were "Oh, yeah, you're Shoeless Joe from Field of Dreams. Can we take a picture?" So there was this patient, her chest wide open, and they're taking pictures of me.

== Release ==
The film was theatrically released on February 23, 1996. A home video release followed on July 23, 1996.

== Reception ==
=== Box office ===
The film opened on 1,573 screens in the United States and Canada and grossed only $1,442,215, the lowest opening weekend gross of any film released on more than 1,500 screens in the previous five years. It only grossed $2,821,671 in the United States and Canada. It had an estimated budget of $18 million.

=== Critical response ===
The film received negative reviews from critics. It holds a 27% rating on Rotten Tomatoes, based on 30 reviews, with an average score of 4.6 out of 10. Audiences surveyed by CinemaScore gave the film a grade "C+" on scale of A to F.

Janet Maslin, writing in The New York Times, said, "Though it's well made, Unforgettable is also gimmicky, with too much of the plot revolving around voyeuristic tricks. Tapping into the same kind of virtual reality gambit seen in Strange Days, Unforgettable deals with one person's ability to borrow the experiences of others ... Insanely far-fetched as this is, it's hardly dull. Mr. Dahl's visual imagination is in fine form, even if his storytelling shows no great eagerness to escape from the B-movie sphere."

Roger Ebert gave the film one and a half stars, calling it "a mess". "In the annals of cinematic goofiness, Unforgettable deserves a place of honor. This is one of the most convoluted, preposterous movies I've seen—a thriller crossed with lots of Mad Scientist stuff, plus wild chases, a shoot-out in a church, a woman taped to a chair in a burning room, an exploding university building, adultery, a massacre in a drugstore, gruesome autopsy scenes and even a moment when a character's life flashes before her eyes, which was more or less what was happening to me by the end of the film. What went wrong? ... The actors play this material perfectly straight, as if they thought this was a serious movie, or even a good one. That makes it all the more agonizing. At least in the old horror films, the actors knew how marginal the material was, and worked a little irony into their performances. Here everybody acts as if they're in something deep, like a Bergman film, or Chicago Hope", wrote Ebert. Gene Siskel gave it a thumbs-up, remarking that it was a "preposterous thriller, but a lot of fun". He made it a point to really praise the "enthusiastic performance by Ray Liotta".

The Miami Herald granted the film two out of four stars: "But there's little joy in watching the puzzle come together, since the script, by newcomer Bill Geddie, cheats. It's impossible for the viewer to solve the case alongside Krane: The movie withholds crucial information until a revelation-packed denouement. On a purely visceral level, the movie works better. At its best, Unforgettable recalls prime Hitchcock in the way it unearths great suspense in familiar situations, such as a long foot chase and a supermarket robbery. The performances are strong, too. Liotta is an ideal choice: Even at his most sympathetic, he seems capable of great evil—he has the eyes of a madman—but the movie settles the issue of his culpability too early ... Dahl has made his name making movies intelligent and cynical; this one is neither. It's a genre piece that buries a terrific premise under a pile of contrivances. It's also a first for Dahl: a movie that's more fun to look at than it is to think about."

Reviewer Bryant Frazer gave the film a C− and wrote, "Liotta and Fiorentino look kind of sleepy throughout the whole proceeding ... but still, it has its moments, including the very ending, that really work—as if somewhere, buried inside this mess, there's a good movie trying to get out."

Chris Kridler of The Baltimore Sun did like the film, calling it "a pretty twisted story, contrived but entertaining".

Mick LaSalle of the San Francisco Chronicle described director Dahl as "a master of inciting fear and dread" and the film as "a striking piece of filmmaking ... For a good 45 minutes of its two-hour running time, Unforgettable has the viewer in a state of oppressive tension. The rest of the time you're just nervous."
