= Candi Carter =

American broadcast executive

- Born: February 19, 1969 (age 57); Detroit Michigan, U.S.
- Education: Boston College
- Occupation: Television producer
- Years active: 1993–present
- Notable credits: The Oprah Winfrey Show (1995–2011); The View (2015–2020); Tamron Hall (2020–2021)

Candi Carter (born February 19, 1969) is an American broadcast executive and television talk show producer. She has won two Daytime Emmy Awards, one in 1994 for Outstanding Children's Programming Special on WISN-TV, and another in 2020 for Outstanding Informative Talk Show for The View.

== Career ==
Carter began her career as a programming producer at WISN-TV in 1993. Since then, she has worked as a producer on shows ranging from The Oprah Winfrey Show, The Tyler Perry Show, Just Keke, Ice & Coco, The View, and Tamron Hall.

=== The Oprah Winfrey Show ===
From 1996 to 2011, Carter worked on The Oprah Winfrey Show, starting as an associate producer and becoming senior producer of the show.

=== The View ===
From 2015 to 2020, Carter served as the executive producer on The View television talk show. Carter was nominated for Daytime Emmy Awards for her role as the executive producer on The View in 2016, 2017, 2018, and 2019. In 2020, the show won the Emmy Award for "Outstanding Informative Talk Show". It was inducted into the NAB Broadcasting Hall of Fame that same year. According to Essence magazine, Carter was the first black woman to executive produce the show.

=== Tamron Hall (talk show) ===
In March 2020, Carter became the executive producer & showrunner on Tamron Hall. She left in the fall of 2021.

=== Knocking ===
In 2022, Carter joined Knocking.com, an e-commerce production company, as its chief content officer.

== Awards and nominations ==
- 1994: Daytime Emmy Awards “Outstanding Children’s Programming Special” for WISN-TV
- 2020: Daytime Emmy Awards “Outstanding Informative Talk Show” winner for The View (talk show)
