= Ladies Who Punch =

2019 book

Ladies Who Punch: The Explosive Inside Story of ‘The View’
- Author: Ramin Setoodeh
- Publisher: Thomas Dunne Books
- Publication date: April 2, 2019
- Pages: 336
- ISBN: 978-1-250-11209-5

Ladies Who Punch: The Explosive Inside Story of "The View" is a 2019 non-fiction book by entertainment journalist Ramin Setoodeh about the American day time talk show The View. The book landed on the New York Times' Bestseller list within its first week of release.

== Background ==
Author Ramin Setoodeh, a writer for Variety, said the idea for the book came from noticing the large amount of traffic that stories about The View received on Variety's website. He spent three years researching the book, and conducted dozens of interviews including 11 current and former co-hosts of the show.

== Content ==
The book tells the story of The View, its impact on American culture, and many controversial moments throughout the show's history.

== Reception ==
Rosie O'Donnell stated that she regretted being interviewed for the book.
