= Just Keke =

American talk show hosted by Keke Palmer

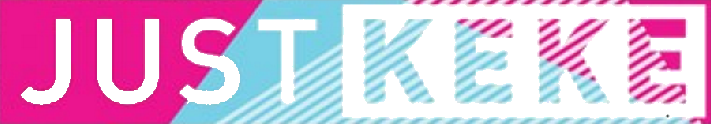
- Genre: Talk show
- Theme music composer: Keke Palmer
- Opening theme: Just Keke
- No. of seasons: 1
- No. of episodes: 20

Production
- Executive producers: Candi Carter; Andrew Scher; Greg Mathis
- Camera setup: Multi-camera
- Running time: 40-42 minutes
- Production companies: Telepictures; Mathis Productions

Original release
- Network: BET
- Release: June 30 – July 25, 2014

Just Keke is an American talk show hosted by Keke Palmer. The show premiered June 30, 2014, on BET. The show was taped in Los Angeles, California, and aired over an initial four-week run. With this series, Palmer became the youngest talk show host in television history (she was 20 years old at the time of its premiere).

In April 2014, BET Networks and Telepictures announced that The Keke Palmer Project was ordered to series. In May of the same year, it was announced that Just Keke would premiere on June 30, 2014, and would air Monday through Friday after 106 & Park.

== Episodes ==
No.	Title	Original release date
1	"Just Keke Premiere"	June 30, 2014
Chris Brown's song "Loyal"; BET Awards party; Kevin Hart; Michael Ealy; Farelle Walker; cypher battle.
2	"The N-Word: Right or Wrong?"	July 1, 2014
Discussion of words; Narvell Benning on Skype; Rachel Jeantel; celebrity dish; hell date.
3	"The New Dating Rules and Fifth Harmony"	July 2, 2014
Side chicks; Skype with Fifth Harmony; hell date with a viewer and actor Donnivin; surprise proposal in studio. "Guest star": Fifth Harmony as themselves
4	"How I Lost 260 Pounds"	July 3, 2014
Throwback Thursday 80s outfits; millennials as monogamous; Raven-Symoné; swimsuit fashions with Tiffany Chynel.
5	"Stop Being a "Girl" Hater"	July 4, 2014
Women hating other women; Wagatwe Wanjuki; empowering women; backup dancer prank; dance-off contest in studio.
6	"N/A"	July 7, 2014
Keke plays one on one with NBA star Amir Johnson; Kingsley, Superwoman and Necole Bitchie; Etcha Sketch Comedy troupe.
7	"N/A"	July 8, 2014
Lil Mama talks about the loss of her mother; Keke pranks the customers of Pink's Hot Dogs.
8	"N/A"	July 9, 2014
Celebrity male panel with Brandon T. Jackson, Chris Brew and Jay Ellis; celebrity stylist Jen Austin's little black dress makeover.
9	"Keke Tackles Hair With Celebrity Stylist Ursula Stephen"	July 10, 2014
Brandy's career and duet with Keke; celebrity hairstylist Ursula Stephens transforms three girls; Keke visits a barbershop.
10	"Keke Gets Real About Sex, Love and Dating"	July 11, 2014
Hip hop artist Ty Dolla Sign; sex expert Shanndon Boodram's secret sex survey; Kendra G.'s celebrity gossip.
11	"Keke Tackles Cyber Bullying"	July 14, 2014
Actor Wesley Jonathan's career and workouts.
12	"Tackling Social Media Fakes"	July 15, 2014
Bria and Shayne Murphy; YouTube star King Bach; Kendra G.'s celebrity gossip.
13	"Karrueche Tran Talks Love and Relationships"	July 16, 2014
Chris Brown's girlfriend, Karrueche Tran; Malcom, a young homeless artist.
14	"Keke Ups Her Dance Game With Hit the Floor Stars"	July 17, 2014
Taylour Paige and Logan Browning from Hit the Floor; breaking up with your best friend.
15	"Gloria and Matt Barnes Quit Reality TV"	July 18, 2014
Reality stars Gloria and Matt Barnes; "Twerk-out"; comedian Zaniab Johnson.
16	"N/A"	July 21, 2015
Supermodel Shaun Ross' career; skin tone; celebrity makeup artist Terrell Mullin reveals beauty secrets.
17	"Do Nice Guys Finish Last In the World of Dating?"	July 22, 2014
Apollo Live's Tony Rock; the Playmakers perform; fashion show for all body types.
18	"Keke Wonders If Millennials Can Be Faithful"	July 23, 2014
Professional football star Corey Liuget; Urban footwear; celebrity gossip with Kendra G.
19	"Keke Gives One Little Fan a Big Makeover, Talks Love Signs"	July 24, 2014
Being dumped on social media; changing a diaper; astrologer David Palmer.
20	"Keke Tackles the Definition of Ghetto"	July 25, 2014
The meaning of ghetto; a dance-off; two homeless valedictorians.
