= Brian Teta =

American television producer

- Education: Muhlenberg College
- Occupation: Television Producer

Brian Fredrick Teta (born August 30, 1976) is an American television producer. Teta is the executive producer of The View, joining the series in its 19th season after spending 11 years working on The Late Show with David Letterman.

== Early life and education ==
Teta attended Baldwin High School in Nassau County, New York. After graduation, he attended Muhlenberg College in Allentown, Pennsylvania. At Muhlenberg, Teta first worked in broadcast, interning at Live with Regis and Kathie Lee, Montel, and The Late Show with David Letterman. He later worked at Montel and The Late Show with David Letterman full-time. Teta worked as Paul Shaffer’s intern at the Late Show in 1997. Teta also worked as a sports editor, entertainment editor and associate editor for The Muhlenberg Weekly, the official, independent student-run newspaper of Muhlenberg College, as well as hosting a weekly radio show on WMUH.

== Career ==
=== The Late Show with David Letterman ===
After graduating, Teta spent five years working as a talent booker and producer for Montel, Ricki Lake and Judge Hatchett before becoming a talent coordinator at The Late Show with David Letterman, responsible for booking guests. One of his first tasks with The Late Show was at the 2004 Summer Olympics, booking gold medal winners for each show. Teta also started out booking guests for David Letterman's segments “Stupid Pet Tricks and “Stupid Human Tricks.” He went on to work in producing celebrity guest interviews, cooking segments, outdoor stunts, political guests and athletes. He often produced Letterman's Christmas show, specifically Jay Thomas’ annual segment with his Lone Ranger story and the “Quarterback Challenge.”

Teta's success booking sports guests led to a unique statistic for The Late Show: They are the first show to book the Super Bowl-winning quarterback 10 years in a row, dating back to Tom Brady after Super Bowl XXXIX in 2005. Teta would run down to the field at the end of the game to book the quarterback, often going up to the player himself to ask them personally. In an interview with the New York Post in 2012, Teta spoke about turning The Late Show into a Super Bowl institution: “After the game the guy who wins is the hero of the moment and can do anything in the world. Lucky for us, that's turned into, first, they're going to Disney World, then they're going to ‘The Late Show.’”

Teta became Segment Producer in 2006, Producer in 2009, and Supervising Producer from 2012 until the show's conclusion in 2015. Teta was nominated for an Emmy Award for Outstanding Variety Series – Talk in 2015 for The Late Show with David Letterman.

=== The View ===
In August 2015, two months after Late Show ended, Teta was named Co-Executive Producer of The View at ABC, joining the show in its 19th season. ABC tapped Teta to produce Live from Hollywood: The After Party with Anthony Anderson, the network's post-Oscars show.

Teta became Executive Producer on September 1, 2017, ahead of the debut of Season 21 of The View. Since Teta joined the show, The View has been nominated for 26 Daytime Emmy awards, including 4 nominations for Teta for Outstanding Talk Show / Entertainment and 1 nomination and win for Outstanding Talk Show / Informative.

== Personal life ==
Teta resides in Rockville Centre, New York, with his wife Heather and their two daughters. He is an avid New York sports fan, rooting for the New York Giants and the New York Yankees. Teta, a lifelong comic book fan, was made a part of the Marvel Universe in April, 2006 when he was mentioned in Ms. Marvel Vol. 2, Issue #1, written by Brian Reed and illustrated by Roberto De La Torre, referencing his role as a talent booker for The Late Show with David Letterman.
