= Troy Dunn =

American television personality

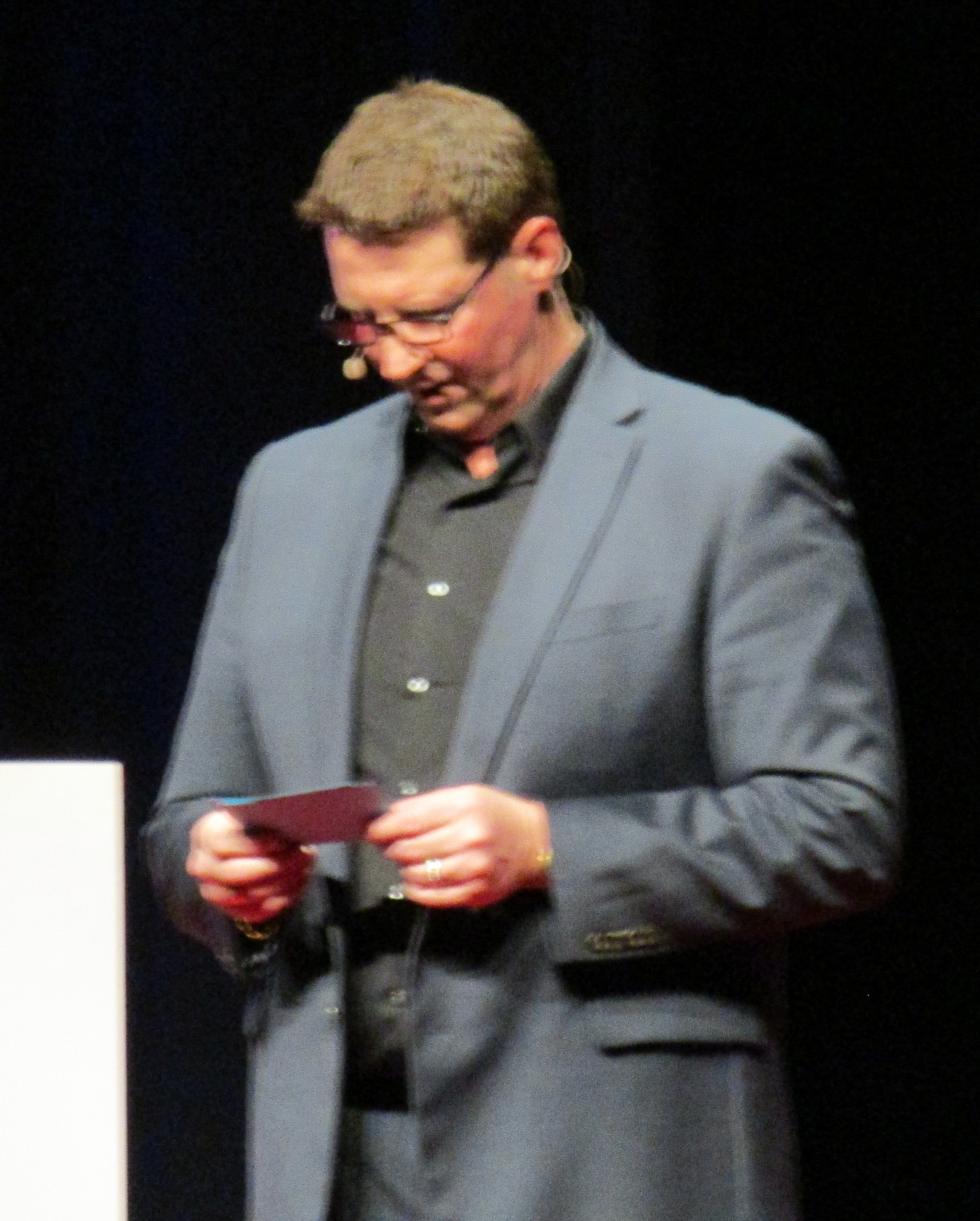
Troy Dunn in 2018

Troy Dunn is an American television personality, producer, and public speaker who specializes in creating and producing television that generally includes reuniting people with long-lost loved ones.

== Early life ==
Troy Dunn was born in Topeka, Kansas, and attended Enid High School in Enid, Oklahoma.

== Career ==
=== Television career ===
Dunn was the executive producer and star of three primetime television shows, including The Locator, which ran for five seasons on the cable network WE. In 2013, the cable network TNT announced it was producing a similar programme, for which he would be executive producer and host, APB with Troy Dunn. In 2015, he was the host and executive producer of the UPTV show Last Hope With Troy Dunn.

In 2018, Dunn hosted the Facebook Watch web series Dr. Phil Presents: Tuesdays with Troy, a web series presented under the Dr. Phil brand.

=== Podcast ===
Dunn executive produced and co-hosted the podcast The Geddie Dunn Show with close friend and Emmy-winning TV producer Bill Geddie from 2017 to 2020.

=== Author ===
Dunn has authorized numerous best-selling books, including Family: The Good F Word, Young Bucks, and Life Lessons From The Locator

=== Founder ===
In 2002, Dunn sold his company BigHugs.com to Ancestry.com.

=== Keynote speaker ===
Dunn gives popular keynote speeches to corporate events worldwide.

=== Charity ===
Dunn launched a 501c3 non-profit organization to assist people in searching for lost loved ones, called The Locator Foundation.

== Personal life ==
Dunn married his high school sweetheart, Jennifer Dunn, in 1988. They have eight children.
