= Ice Loves Coco =

American reality television series

- Genre: Reality
- Starring: Tracy "Ice-T" Marrow; Nicole "Coco" Austin
- Country of origin: United States
- Original language: English
- No. of seasons: 3
- No. of episodes: 28

Production
- Executive producers: Brad Spotto; Carmen Mitcho; Coco; Greg Nash; Ice-T; Jay James; Jorge Hinojosa; Shawn Miles
- Camera setup: Multiple
- Running time: 40 to 43 minutes
- Production company: Comcast Entertainment Studios

Original release
- Network: E!
- Release: June 12, 2011 – January 6, 2013

Ice Loves Coco is an American reality television series that debuted on E! in the United States and Canada on June 12, 2011. The series chronicles the daily lives of rapper and actor Ice-T and wife Coco Austin. In September 2011, it was announced by Coco that a second season had been commissioned, and filming began in October 2011, with the second season premiering on February 19, 2012. The third season of the series premiered on October 28, 2012.

Ice-T announced via his podcast on February 4, 2014, that Ice Loves Coco had been canceled due to the couple working on a possible talk show. The talk show, which would be known as Ice & Coco, ran for a three-week test run in August 2015 with no further pickup.

== Episodes ==
Season	Episodes	Originally aired	
Season	Episodes	First aired	Last aired
1	8	June 12, 2011	August 7, 2011
2	10	February 19, 2012	April 29, 2012
3	10	October 28, 2012	January 6, 2013

=== Season 1 (2011) ===
No. overall	No. in season	Title	Original release date	Viewers (millions)
1	1	"Baby's Got Back"	June 12, 2011	1.58
2	2	"Baby's Got Baby VR"	June 19, 2011	1.97
3	3	"Baby Got Birthday"	June 28, 2011	1.36
4	4	"Baby Got Business"	July 10, 2011	1.69
5	5	"Baby Got Family"	July 17, 2011	1.85
6	6	"Baby Got Ghost"	July 24, 2011	1.61
7	7	"Baby Got Vows"	July 31, 2011	1.74
8	8	"Baby Got Birth"	August 7, 2011	2.05

=== Season 2 (2012) ===
No. overall	No. in season	Title	Original release date	Viewers (millions)
9	1	"Baby Got Bad News"	February 19, 2012	1.88
10	2	"Baby Got Besties"	February 20, 2012	1.48
11	3	"Baby Got Third Wheel"	March 4, 2012	1.67
12	4	"Baby Got Backseat Driver"	March 11, 2012	1.40
13	5	"Baby Got Separation Anxiety"	March 18, 2012	1.25
14	6	"Baby Got Guest Star"	April 1, 2012	1.15
15	7	"Baby Got Godparents"	April 8, 2012	1.63
16	8	"Baby Got Sundance"	April 15, 2012	1.09
17	9	"Baby Got Hawaii"	April 22, 2012	1.27
18	10	"Baby Got Puppies"	April 29, 2012	1.29

=== Season 3 (2012–13) ===
No. overall	No. in season	Title	Original release date	Viewers (millions)
19	1	"Baby Got Haters"	October 28, 2012	1.14
20	2	"Baby Got Bridesmaids"	November 4, 2012	0.78
21	3	"Baby Got Forecast"	November 11, 2012	0.73
22	4	"Baby Got Laughs"	November 18, 2012	0.61
23	5	"Baby Got Balls"	November 25, 2012	0.56
24	6	"Baby Got Super Powers"	December 2, 2012	0.62
25	7	"Baby Got a Big Break"	December 16, 2012	0.42
26	8	"Baby Got Hurricane Heels"	December 23, 2012	0.45
27	9	"Baby Got Good Bye"	December 30, 2012	0.41
28	10	"Baby Got Stage Presence"	January 6, 2013	0.75
