= Hilary Estey McLoughlin =

American television executive

- Born: August 6, 1962 (age 64)
- Education: Boston University
- Occupation: Television Executive

Hilary Elin Estey McLoughlin (born August 6, 1962) is a television producer and development executive. She currently serves as the Executive Producer of "Baby, this is Keke Palmer," a Wondery production.

== Career ==
From 2021-2025, she served as the Co-Founder and Co-CEO of NY27 Productions, an independent production company. Under this banner, she produced projects like the docuseries "Confessions of Octomom"(2025) and the Daytime Emmy Award-winning special "Unleashing Hope: The Power of Service Dogs for Children with Autism" (2025).

Prior to 2021, Estey McLoughlin served as Senior Executive Producer of The View and non fiction content for ABC News, where she oversaw the development of new multiplatform series. Under her tenure, "The View" was named "the most important political TV show in America" in a May 2019 cover story by The New York Times Magazine and the show won its first Daytime Emmy since 2003. She is also widely credited with credited with bringing Joy Behar back to the show as cohost.

From 2013–2015, Estey McLoughlin served as President of Creative Affairs at CBS Television Distribution, where she oversaw all first-run syndicated programming and operations of veteran franchises such as Judge Judy, Dr. Phil, Rachael Ray, and Entertainment Tonight. While at CBS, Estey McLoughlin also played an integral role in the staffing and launch of The Late Late Show with James Corden.

From 2006–2013, she served as President of Warner Bros. Television's syndication production house Telepictures Productions, where she oversaw all aspects of the company, including programming such as The Rosie O'Donnell Show, The Tyra Banks Show, Ellen, Extra, Judge Mathis, and TMZ.

== Awards and lists ==
Estey McLoughlin is the recipient of several Daytime Emmy Awards:

- One for "Outstanding Daytime Special" in her role as Executive Producer of "Unleashing Hope: The Power of Service Dogs for Children with Autism" (2026).
- One for "Outstanding Informative Talk Show" in her role as the Senior Executive Producer of The View (2020).
- Two for "Outstanding Talk Show" in her role as the Executive Producer of the Rosie O'Donnell Show (1998, 1999).

Additionally, Estey McLoughlin has been featured on the following lists:

- Variety's 2017 Women's Impact Report
- Variety's The New Power New York List (2016)
- The Hollywood Reporter's Women in Entertainment Power 100 List (2014, 2012, 2011, 2010, 2009)

== Early life and education ==
Hilary Estey McLoughlin was born in Forest Hills, New York and studied communications at Boston University.
