= Tamron Hall (talk show) =

American television talk show (2019–present)

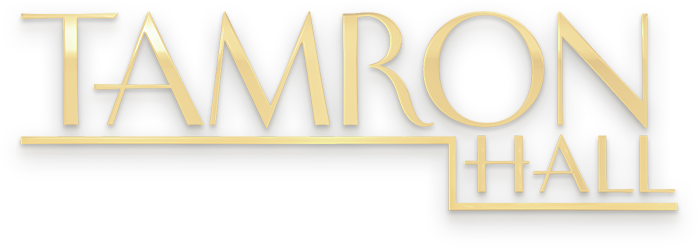
- Also known as: The Tamron Hall Show
- Genre: Talk show; Infotainment
- Created by: Tamron Hall
- Directed by: Randi Clarke Lennon (1–2); Adriane Adler (3–present)
- Presented by: Tamron Hall
- Narrated by: Steve Kamer; Vanessa James
- Opening theme: "Shine" by Fantasia (1–5) "Good Life" by The Baylor Project (6-)
- Country of origin: United States
- Original language: English
- No. of seasons: 8
- No. of episodes: 1,262

Production
- Executive producers: Tamron Hall; Bill Geddie (1); Candi Carter (1–3); Quiana Burns (3–present)
- Producers: Talia Parkinson-Jones (1); Kristin Graham (1–3); Shannon High (4–present)
- Production location: Manhattan
- Camera setup: Multi-camera
- Running time: 42 minutes
- Production companies: May Avenue Productions (season 1); Summerdale Productions; ABC News (season 3–present)

Original release
- Network: Syndication
- Release: September 9, 2019 – present

Tamron Hall (Note: Sometimes referred to as The Tamron Hall Show) is an American talk show hosted by American broadcast journalist and author Tamron Hall. Produced by ABC News, it debuted on September 9, 2019, in first-run syndication on ABC Owned Television Stations and local stations across the United States and Canada.

In October 2020, the series was renewed for a third season, which premiered on September 6, 2021. In November 2021, the series was renewed for fourth and fifth seasons through 2024. On April 15, 2024, the show has been renewed for a sixth season. In February 2025, the show was renewed for a seventh season. In March 2026, the series was renewed for an eighth season.

== Production ==
Hall had initially announced plans to develop a talk show in July 2017.

On August 8, 2018, Hall entered into an agreement with Disney-ABC Domestic Television to produce the show. The show was picked up by ABC Owned Television Stations in late September 2018 and gradually expanded its clearance over the next few months, with more station groups, including Hearst Television, later picking up the show. With the show receiving coverage in 85% of the United States and 47 of the country's top 50 television markets, DADT announced on March 4, 2019, that the show would premiere on September 9, 2019. The show is expected to replace both Who Wants to Be a Millionaire (which was canceled in May 2019 after a total of 20 years on the air) and Right This Minute on ABC's owned-and-operated stations.

In January 2019, ABC Entertainment named Bill Geddie, the former longtime producer of The View was named as executive producer of the show. Talia Parkinson-Jones, co-executive producer of The Wendy Williams Show would be named co-executive producer of the show in June 2019. The show is recorded in the ABC Broadcast Center on the Upper West Side of Manhattan.

On March 13, 2020, Walt Disney Television halted on the series due to the COVID-19 pandemic. In later March, it was announced the series would return to television beginning March 30, with the show being taped from Hall's home. On March 18, it was announced that The View's executive producer, Candi Carter, would be joining the show following the departures of Geddie and Parkinson-Jones as the series' executive producer and showrunner.

On September 8, 2020, it was announced that an encore presentation of the show would air on Oprah Winfrey Network starting on September 14. On August 20, 2021, it was announced that the show will be produced by ABC News with the start of the third season, though no changes in overall distribution will occur. On October 6, 2021, it was announced that Candi Carter would be departing the show as executive producer and showrunner. Good Morning America Weekend executive producer Quiana Burns was named as interim executive producer during the search for the new permanent executive producer. On November 8, 2021, ABC Owned Television Stations announced that the show has been renewed for fourth and fifth seasons, through 2024. In February 2022, ABC News officially named Quiana Burns as the permanent executive producer of the show after being named interim executive producer in October 2021, following the departure of former executive producer Candi Carter. On March 2, 2023, the show was renewed for a fifth season.

On the morning of April 10, 2024, the ABC Broadcast Center was evacuated after a grease fire broke out in the Tamron Hall kitchen. No one was injured, but that day's episode was cancelled and replaced by a rerun of the April 8 episode. The View—which is broadcast next door—was not disrupted. On April 15, 2024, the show was renewed for its sixth season in the 2024-2025 season.

Halfway through the sixth season, Tamron Hall relocated from the ABC Broadcast Center to Studio B of Disney's new 7 Hudson Square headquarters, sharing a set with The View.

== Episodes ==
Tamron Hall celebrated its 100th episode on February 11, 2020. The series celebrated the airing of its 300th episode on April 14, 2021. On May 12, 2022, the show had a celebration for the series’ 500th episode. The 1000th episode was celebrated on March 31, 2025.

== Syndication ==
As of May 2022, the series airs as daytime programming on 206 markets in the United States including ABC Owned Television Stations, Hearst Television and Bounce TV. The series also broadcasts to the United States Armed Forces on AFN Spectrum, and Canada's Global Television Network.

== Reception ==
=== Ratings ===
Since its second season premiere on September 14, Tamron Hall’s audience is averaging 1.2 million Total Viewers season to date, up 9% versus the same week as the debut season in September 2019.

=== Accolades ===
Awards and nominations received by Tamron Hall
Award	Year	Category	Nominee(s)	Result
Daytime Emmy Awards	2020	Outstanding Informative Talk Show Host	Tamron Hall	Won
Daytime Emmy Awards	2020	Outstanding Costume Design/Styling	Eric Niemand, Ashley Michelle Miller	Nominated
Daytime Emmy Awards	2020	Outstanding Makeup	Tenelle Veira	Nominated
Daytime Emmy Awards	2021	Outstanding Informative Talk Show Host	Tamron Hall	Nominated
Daytime Emmy Awards	2021	Outstanding Talk Show Informative	The Tamron Hall Show	Nominated
Daytime Emmy Awards	2021	Outstanding Live and Direct-to-Tape Sound Mixing	The Tamron Hall Show	Nominated
Daytime Emmy Awards	2022	Outstanding Talk Show Informative	The Tamron Hall Show	Nominated
Daytime Emmy Awards	2022	Outstanding Informative Talk Show Host	Tamron Hall	Won
Daytime Emmy Awards	2022	Outstanding Art Direction/Set Decoration/Scenic Design	The Tamron Hall Show	Nominated
Daytime Emmy Awards	2022	Outstanding Makeup	The Tamron Hall Show	Nominated
Daytime Emmy Awards	2023	Outstanding Talk Series Host	Tamron Hall	Nominated
Daytime Emmy Awards	2023	Outstanding Hairstyling & Makeup	The Tamron Hall Show	Nominated
Daytime Emmy Awards	2023	Outstanding Daytime Promotional Announcement	The Tamron Hall Show	Nominated
Daytime Emmy Awards	2024	Outstanding Daytime Talk Series Host	Tamron Hall	Nominated
Daytime Emmy Awards	2024	Outstanding Daytime Talk Series	The Tamron Hall Show	Nominated
Daytime Emmy Awards	2024	Outstanding Live Sound Mixing and Sound Editing	The Tamron Hall Show	Nominated
Daytime Emmy Awards	2026	Outstanding Daytime Talk Series Host	Tamron Hall	Nominated
Daytime Emmy Awards	2026	Outstanding Main Title and Graphic Design for a Daytime Program	The Tamron Hall Show	Nominated
Gracie Awards	2021	Outstanding Talk Show Host – Entertainment/Information	Tamron Hall	Won
Gracie Awards	2022	On-Air Talent – Entertainment	Tamron Hall	Won
Gracie Awards	2024	Director - Talk Show	Adriane Adler	Won
Iris Awards	2022	Award for Excellence, Television Performer	Tamron Hall	Won
NAACP Image Awards	2020	NAACP Image Award for Outstanding Talk Series	The Tamron Hall Show	Nominated
NAACP Image Awards	2021	NAACP Image Award for Outstanding Talk Series	The Tamron Hall Show	Nominated
NAACP Image Awards	2022	NAACP Image Award for Outstanding Talk Series	The Tamron Hall Show	Nominated
NAACP Image Awards	2023	Outstanding Talk Series	The Tamron Hall Show	Nominated
NAACP Image Awards	2024	Outstanding Talk Series	The Tamron Hall Show	Nominated
NAACP Image Awards	2024	Outstanding Host in a Talk or News/Information (Series or Special) - Individual or Ensemble	Tamron Hall	Nominated
NAACP Image Awards	2025	Outstanding Talk Series	The Tamron Hall Show	Nominated
GLAAD Media Awards	2023	Outstanding Variety or Talk Show Episode	Episode: "Here I Am"	Nominated
GLAAD Media Awards	2024	Outstanding Variety or Talk Show Episode	Episode: "Unapologetically Me"	Nominated
