= Unleashing Hope: The Power of Service Dogs for Children With Autism =

2025 documentary film

Unleashing Hope: The Power of Service Dogs for Children With Autism is a 2025 documentary film which details the service dog program of the Guide Dogs of America for children with autism. The film focuses on Kuma, a service dog owned by Rosie O'Donnell who assists her autistic child.
