= Bill Geddie =

American television producer (1955–2023)

- Born: William Fredrick Geddie; July 17, 1955; San Antonio, Texas, U.S.
- Died: July 20, 2023 (aged 68); Rancho Mirage, California, U.S.
- Occupation: Television producer
- Spouse: Barbara Geddie (m. 1979)

William Fredrick Geddie (July 17, 1955 – July 20, 2023) was an American television producer. He was the co-creator (with Barbara Walters) of ABC Daytime's The View, on the ABC television network, and was also the show's executive producer for its first 16 seasons.

Geddie was also a partner with Walters in BarWall Productions and co-produced popular American television shows such as the Barbara Walters Specials and The 10 Most Fascinating People annual special.

== Early life ==
William Frederick Geddie was born in San Antonio, Texas on July 17, 1955. He graduated from the University of Texas at Austin in 1977, majoring in communications/film. He had a job buffing the floors at KOCO-TV, in Oklahoma City and he said, "When you buffed the floors—this is how informal television was back then—they let you run camera for the local news. What got me off the floor was that I went to the news director and said I had shot film before, so he gave me a job shooting film."

== Career ==
Geddie was the co-creator and the original executive producer for The View; it debuted in August 1997 and he stayed with the show until 2014. He was frequently featured on the show; he acknowledged, "If I can be the brunt of a joke, if I can do to get a laugh, or if I can help in any way that's what I'll do. Otherwise, that is it. I stay out of the way... if you watch the show, you see that generally speaking I'm a side player and I'm basically there to get a laugh." Geddie had well documented disagreements, in particular with former hosts Star Jones, Rosie O'Donnell, and guest host Kathy Griffin. He left the show in 2014.

ABC Entertainment named Geddie as executive producer for Tamron Hall on January 22, 2019. He left the show in March 2020.

Geddie was a screenwriter in his spare time. He wrote the script for Unforgettable, a film starring Ray Liotta and Linda Fiorentino.

He was executive producer, writer and director of the Barbara Walters Specials and The 10 Most Fascinating People.

Geddie was the owner of May Avenue Productions. He was a partner with Walters in BarWall Productions for 25 years.

From 2017 to 2020, Geddie co-hosted The Geddie Dunn Show, a weekly podcast with longtime friend and television personality Troy Dunn.

== Death ==
Geddie died of coronary-related factors on July 20, 2023, three days after his 68th birthday.

== Awards and nominations ==
Geddie won six local Emmy Awards and four national Emmy Awards. In 2003, he won a Daytime Emmy Award in the Outstanding Talk Show category for his work as executive producer of The View. He was presented with the Lifetime Achievement Award at the 39th Daytime Emmy Awards on June 23, 2012, for his contributions as writer, producer, and director in his more than 30-year television career. Malachy Wienges, chairman of NATAS said, "Bill Geddie is an icon in the television industry."
