= The View =

American talk show

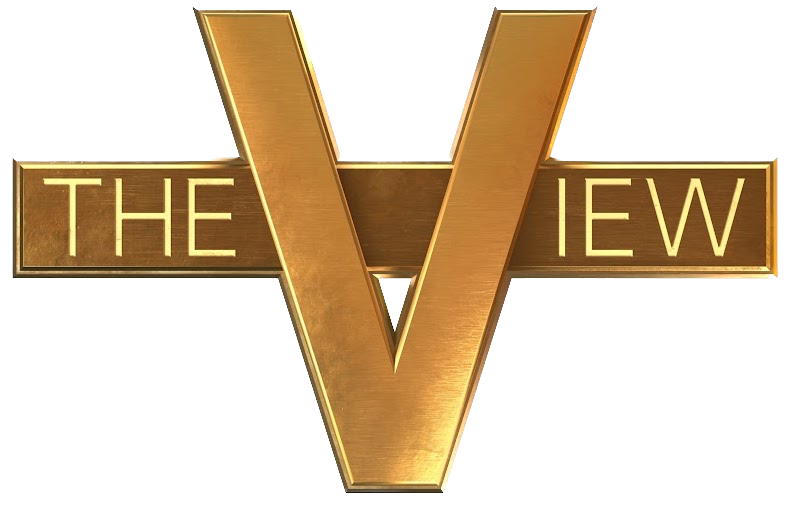
- Genre: Talk show
- Created by: Barbara Walters; Bill Geddie
- Directed by: Sarah de la O
- Presented by: Joy Behar; Barbara Walters; Meredith Vieira; Star Jones; Debbie Matenopoulos; Lisa Ling; Elisabeth Hasselbeck; Rosie O'Donnell; Whoopi Goldberg; Sherri Shepherd; Jenny McCarthy; Nicolle Wallace; Rosie Perez; Raven-Symoné; Michelle Collins; Candace Cameron Bure; Paula Faris; Jedediah Bila; Sara Haines; Sunny Hostin; Meghan McCain; Abby Huntsman; Ana Navarro; Alyssa Farah Griffin
- Opening theme: "World's Gone Crazy" by Mary J. Blige (seasons 20–24) "For My Girls" by Brandy Norwood and Nicole Scherzinger (seasons 25–27) "This Version" by Leona Lewis (season 28–present)
- Country of origin: United States
- Original language: English
- No. of seasons: 30
- No. of episodes: 6,000+

Production
- Executive producers: Barbara Walters (1997–2022); Bill Geddie (1997–2014); Bill Wolff (2014–2015); Candi Carter (2015–2020); Brian Teta (2015–present); Hilary Estey McLoughlin (2017–2021)
- Production location: Manhattan
- Running time: 60 minutes
- Production company: ABC News

Original release
- Network: ABC
- Release: August 11, 1997 – present

The View is an American talk show that was created by broadcast journalist Barbara Walters and TV producer Bill Geddie. As of 2026, now in its 30th season, the show has aired on ABC as part of the network's daytime programming block since August 11, 1997. The show features a multi-generational panel of women, who discuss the day's "Hot Topics", such as sociopolitical and entertainment news. In addition to the conversation segments, the panel also conducts interviews with prominent figures, such as celebrities and politicians. Production of the show was held in ABC Television Studio 23 in New York City until 2014, when it relocated to the adjacent ABC Broadcast Center, where it stayed until September 2024, when production relocated to ABC Studio B, also in New York City.

Throughout its entire run, The View has had 24 permanent "co-hosts" of varying characteristics and ideologies, with the number of contracted permanent co-hosts ranging between four and eight women per season. The original panel comprised Walters, broadcast journalist Meredith Vieira, lawyer Star Jones, television host Debbie Matenopoulos, and comedian Joy Behar. The current lineup consists of Behar, entertainer Whoopi Goldberg, lawyer Sunny Hostin, television host Sara Haines, television personality Ana Navarro, and political strategist Alyssa Farah Griffin. In addition, the show often makes use of male and female guest panelists.

The View has won Daytime Emmy Awards, including Outstanding Talk Show, Outstanding Informative Talk Show, and Outstanding Talk Show Host. The show has received praise from the Associated Press, Entertainment Weekly, the Los Angeles Times, Slate, as well as The New York Times, which deemed it "the most important political TV show in America". Beginning in its tenth season, the series became subject to on-air controversies and media criticism involving its panel. It was transferred from the helm of ABC's entertainment division to that of ABC News in 2014 following a decline in ratings. By 2021, The View had become the most-viewed news and talk program in daytime television.

== Format ==
The original opening credits for The View featured a voice-over from the show's creator and executive producer, broadcast journalist Barbara Walters, explaining the show's premise as well as its co-hosts' credentials:

I've always wanted to do a show with women of different generations, backgrounds, and views: a working mother (broadcast journalist Meredith Vieira); a professional in her 30s (lawyer Star Jones); a young woman just starting out (television host Debbie Matenopoulos); and then somebody who's done almost everything and will say almost anything (comedian Joy Behar). And in a perfect world, I'd get to join the group whenever I wanted...

Walters described it as "a talk show featuring four or five women 'of different backgrounds, different generations, and different opinions,' who would discuss the topics of the day, mixing humor with intelligent debate". The show begins with a segment that features the panel engaging in a discussion pertaining to subjects ranging from politics to social issues as well as pop culture, commonly referred to as "Hot Topics". Every episode features multiple "Hot Topics" segments, which take up to most–if not all–of the day's show. The discussions are frequently followed by interviews with guests. The show also periodically conducts audience giveaways, which often accompanies deal-of-the-day presentations for the home audience under the branding of View Your Deal. Every broadcast concludes with the closing remarks: "Have a great day, everyone, and take a little time to enjoy the view."

The 12th season of The View heavily focused on the events surrounding the 2008 United States presidential election and featured politicians John McCain, Hillary Clinton, and Barack Obama as guests. Its 13th season saw the introduction of male guest moderators; among them were television personality Tom Bergeron, actor D. L. Hughley, journalist Bryant Gumbel, and television host Joe Scarborough. Male personalities have since begun serving as guests more frequently, specifically on Fridays, dubbed "Guy Day Friday". In 2013, the show was speculated to be "trying to become less political". It began refocusing on politics leading to the 2016 United States presidential election and has reincorporated it back into "Hot Topics" discussions since. During the 25th season, the series introduced weekly episodes that each feature a former co-host as a guest, titled "Flashback Fridays".

== Co-hosts ==
=== Timeline ===
Co-hosts timeline of The View
Co-host
| Co-host | Years | | | | | | | | | | | | | | | | | | | | | | | | | | | | | | |
| Co-host | Years | Seasons | | | | | | | | | | | | | | | | | | | | | | | | | | | | | |
| Co-host | Years | 1 | 2 | 3 | 4 | 5 | 6 | 7 | 8 | 9 | 10 | 11 | 12 | 13 | 14 | 15 | 16 | 17 | 18 | 19 | 20 | 21 | 22 | 23 | 24 | 25 | 26 | 27 | 28 | 29 | 30 |
|---|---|---|---|---|---|---|---|---|---|---|---|---|---|---|---|---|---|---|---|---|---|---|---|---|---|---|---|---|---|---|---|
| Meredith Vieira | 1997–2006 | | | | | | | | | | | | | | | | | | | | | | | | | | | | | | |
| Star Jones | 1997–2006 | | | | | | | | | | | | | | | | | | | | | | | | | | | | | | |
| Debbie Matenopoulos | 1997–1998 | | | | | | | | | | | | | | | | | | | | | | | | | | | | | | |
| Joy Behar | 1997–2013, 2015–present | | | | | | | | | | | | | | | | | | | | | | | | | | | | | | |
| Barbara Walters | 1997–2014 | | | | | | | | | | | | | | | | | | | | | | | | | | | | | | |
| Lisa Ling | 1999–2002 | | | | | | | | | | | | | | | | | | | | | | | | | | | | | | |
| Elisabeth Hasselbeck | 2003–2013 | | | | | | | | | | | | | | | | | | | | | | | | | | | | | | |
| Rosie O'Donnell | 2006–2007, 2014–2015 | | | | | | | | | | | | | | | | | | | | | | | | | | | | | | |
| Whoopi Goldberg | 2007–present | | | | | | | | | | | | | | | | | | | | | | | | | | | | | | |
| Sherri Shepherd | 2007–2014 | | | | | | | | | | | | | | | | | | | | | | | | | | | | | | |
| Jenny McCarthy | 2013–2014 | | | | | | | | | | | | | | | | | | | | | | | | | | | | | | |
| Nicolle Wallace | 2014–2015 | | | | | | | | | | | | | | | | | | | | | | | | | | | | | | |
| Rosie Perez | 2014–2015 | | | | | | | | | | | | | | | | | | | | | | | | | | | | | | |
| Raven-Symoné | 2015–2016 | | | | | | | | | | | | | | | | | | | | | | | | | | | | | | |
| Michelle Collins | 2015–2016 | | | | | | | | | | | | | | | | | | | | | | | | | | | | | | |
| Candace Cameron Bure | 2015–2016 | | | | | | | | | | | | | | | | | | | | | | | | | | | | | | |
| Paula Faris | 2015–2018 | | | | | | | | | | | | | | | | | | | | | | | | | | | | | | |
| Jedediah Bila | 2016–2017 | | | | | | | | | | | | | | | | | | | | | | | | | | | | | | |
| Sara Haines | 2016–2018, 2020–present | | | | | | | | | | | | | | | | | | | | | | | | | | | | | | |
| Sunny Hostin | 2016–present | | | | | | | | | | | | | | | | | | | | | | | | | | | | | | |
| Meghan McCain | 2017–2021 | | | | | | | | | | | | | | | | | | | | | | | | | | | | | | |
| Abby Huntsman | 2018–2020 | | | | | | | | | | | | | | | | | | | | | | | | | | | | | | |
| Ana Navarro | 2022–present | | | | | | | | | | | | | | | | | | | | | | | | | | | | | | |
| Alyssa Farah Griffin | 2022–present | | | | | | | | | | | | | | | | | | | | | | | | | | | | | | |

=== Seasons 1–10 (1997–2007) ===
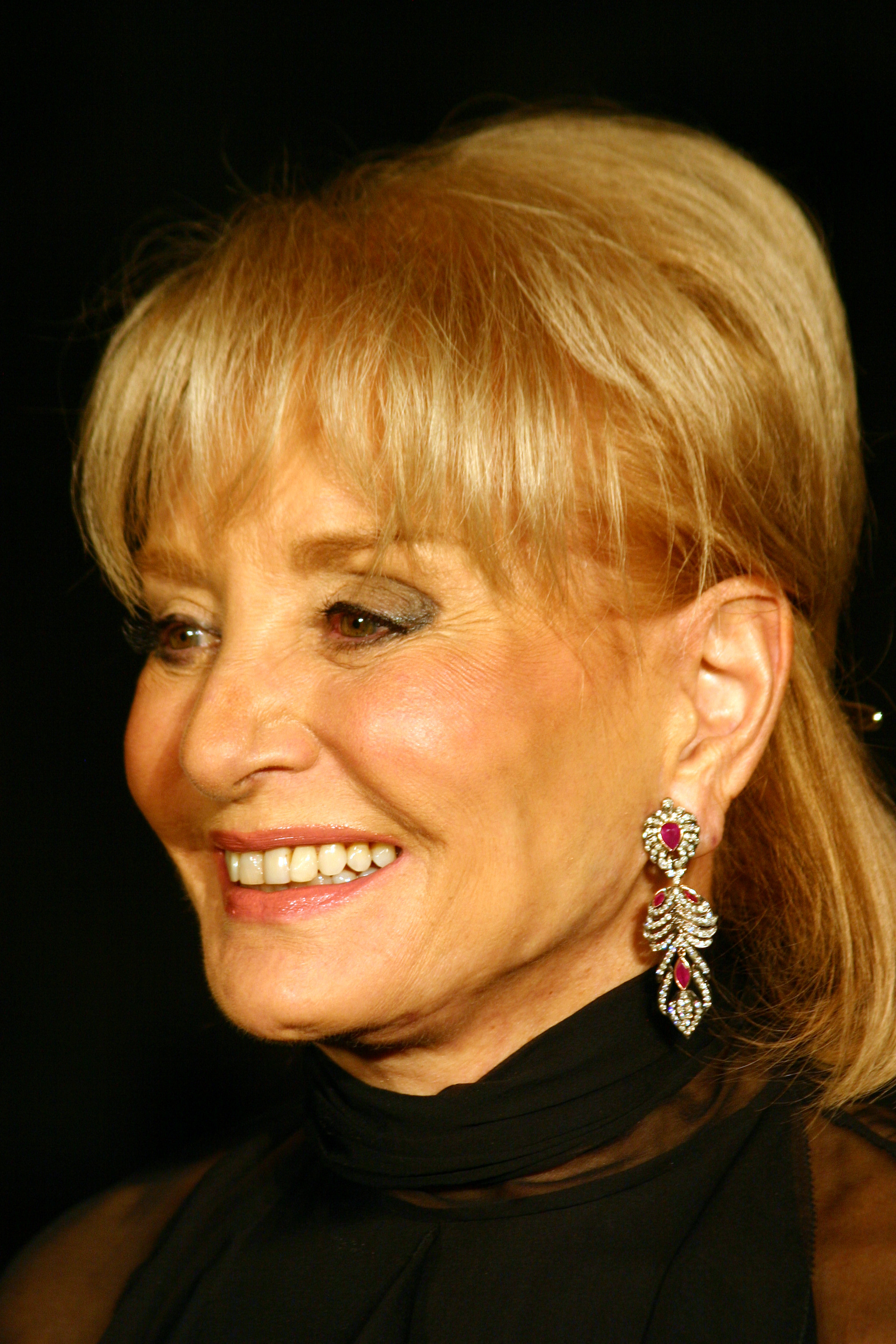
Broadcast journalist Barbara Walters created the series and co-hosted it from 1997 to 2014.

The View premiered with four co-hosts: Meredith Vieira as moderator, Star Jones, Debbie Matenopoulos, and Barbara Walters. Joy Behar, who filled in as the fourth co-host when Walters was unavailable, soon became a full-time co-host. The five women were the first group that auditioned for the panel, with Behar describing them as having immediately clicked. Following Matenopoulos's firing in December 1998, broadcast journalist Lisa Ling was brought on as a new co-host in 1999. Ling departed the show in December 2002 to host the series National Geographic Explorer. Former Survivor: The Australian Outback castaway Elisabeth Hasselbeck replaced Ling beginning November 24, 2003, after Hasselbeck, television personality Rachel Campos-Duffy, and actress Erin Hershey Presley each received a week-long on-air tryout.

In 2006, Vieira left the show to become co-anchor of the NBC morning program Today; her final episode aired on June 9. That same month, Jones also left the show. Her departure, originally scheduled for July, was brought forward by Walters, publicly feeling "betrayed" by Jones for unexpectedly announcing her departure two days ahead of schedule. She also said ABC executives had decided not to renew Jones's contract due to diminished approval for Jones through their market research. Jones later claimed the decision to leave was not hers and that producers informed her that they would not be renewing her contract in April.

During the 33rd Daytime Emmy Awards in April 2006, entertainer Rosie O'Donnell was introduced as a co-host for the show's tenth season; she made her debut on September 5. After a string of controversies O'Donnell left the show in April 2007 due to failed renewal negotiations. The following month, ABC stated that O'Donnell had asked to be let out of her contract three weeks before its expiration and that she had been granted permission to depart immediately.

=== Seasons 11–18 (2007–2015) ===
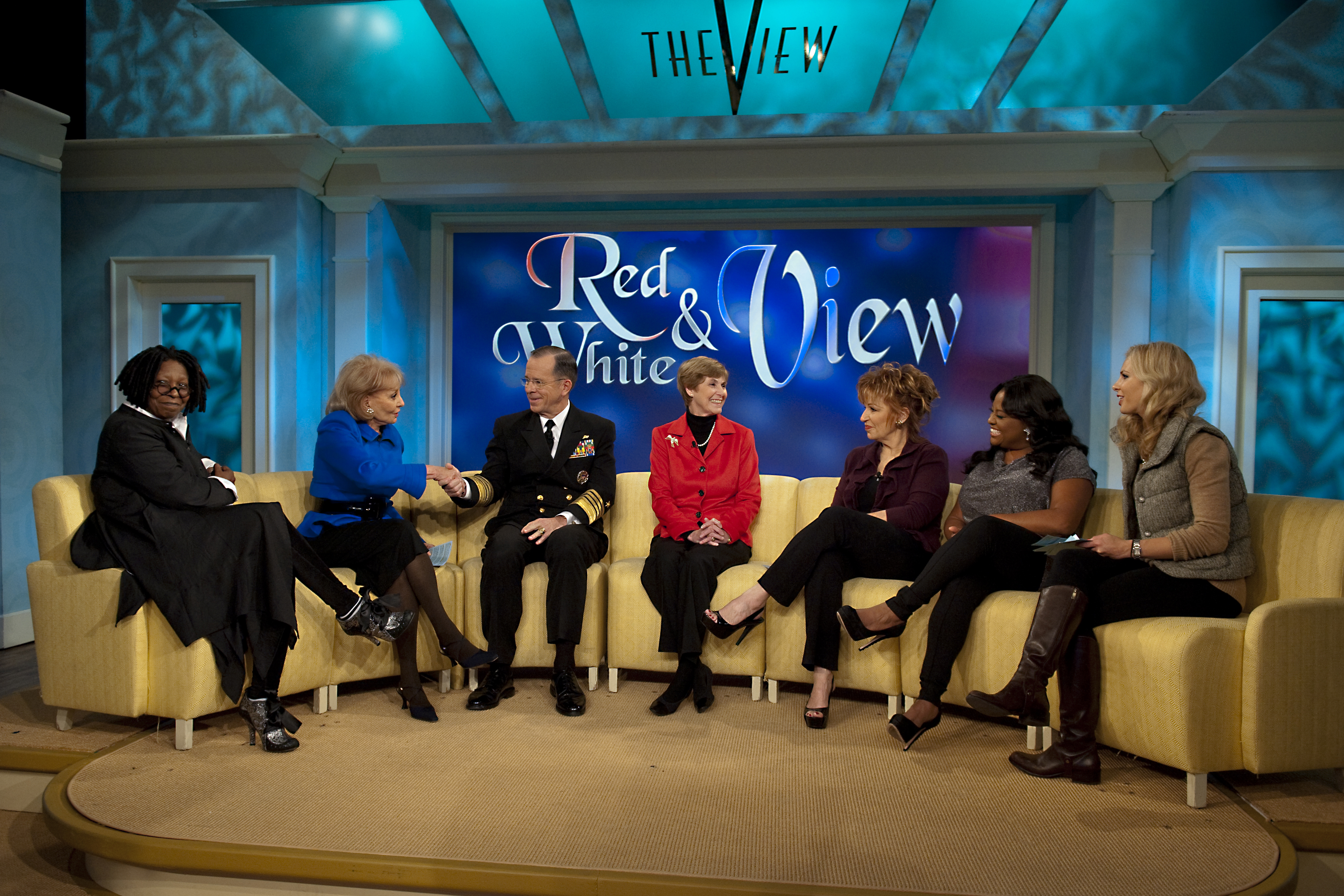
The co-hosts interview U.S. Navy Adm. Michael Mullen and his wife, Deborah, on November 24, 2010.

In August 2007, Walters replaced O'Donnell with actress Whoopi Goldberg for season 11. Goldberg debuted during the season premiere on September 4. Actress Sherri Shepherd joined as a permanent co-host beginning September 10. Hasselbeck went on maternity leave from October 2007 to January 2008 and again from August to October 2009, with rotating guest co-hosts filling in during the latter. In August 2009, Walters, Behar, Hasselbeck, Goldberg, and Shepherd won the Daytime Emmy Award for Outstanding Talk Show Host. Walters took a hiatus after undergoing open-heart surgery in May 2010 and returned on September 7 during the season 14 premiere broadcast.

In 2013, Behar left the series at the end of season 16. That same month, Hasselbeck was reported to be departing alongside Behar due to market research finding both of their views too "polarizing", which Walters denied. Despite Walters' earlier denial, Hasselbeck indeed departed the show on July 10 to join the Fox News morning program Fox & Friends. Behar's final episode, a This Is Your Life-style tribute to her, aired on August 9. Actress Jenny McCarthy became a co-host the following season and debuted on its premiere broadcast on September 9.

Walters retired on May 16, 2014. Shepherd and McCarthy departed the following month and made their final appearances on August 11.

After making guest appearances during the previous season, actress Rosie Perez as well as former White House Communications Director Nicolle Wallace permanently joined the series in its 18th season, establishing Perez as the series' first Latina co-host; the two debuted alongside O'Donnell, who permanently returned, and Goldberg during the season premiere on September 15, 2014. Perez took a hiatus at the end of the year to rehearse for her role in the play Fish in the Dark and returned on February 3, 2015. That same month, representatives for O'Donnell confirmed that she would once again exit the panel due to "personal reasons"; her final appearance aired on February 12. Actress Raven-Symoné joined the series full-time in June after frequently guest co-hosting, and the following month, comedian Michelle Collins, who had been a frequent guest, was permanently added for the following season. Perez and Wallace exited at the conclusion of the 18th season in August.

=== Seasons 19–30 (2015–present) ===
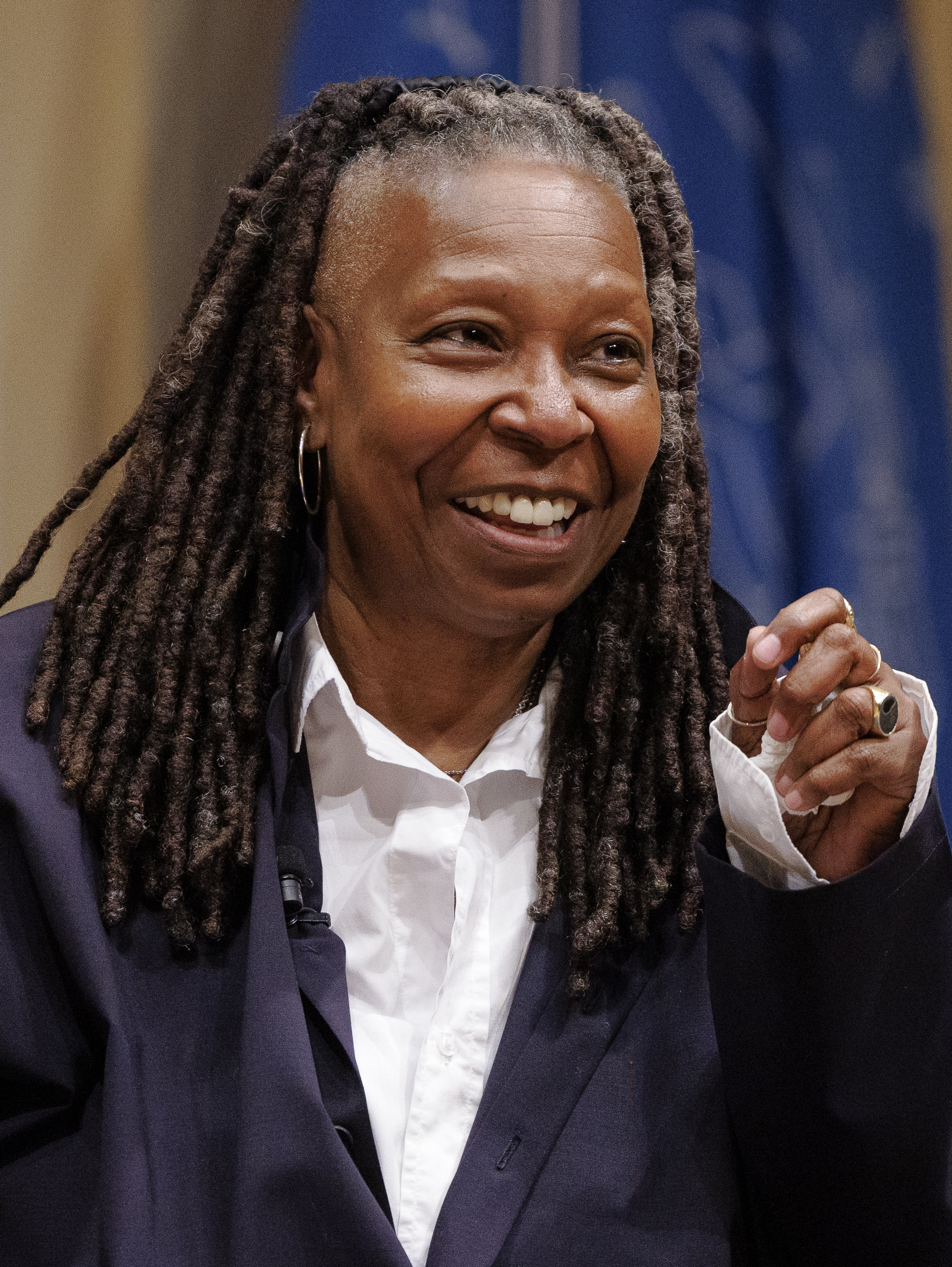
Entertainer Whoopi Goldberg has co-hosted and moderated the series since 2007.

The 19th season saw the return of Behar as well as the addition of actress Candace Cameron Bure and broadcast journalist Paula Faris as co-hosts alongside Goldberg, Raven-Symoné, and Collins, the lattermost of whom departed in June 2016. The following season began with eight rotating co-hosts: Behar, Goldberg, Raven-Symoné, Bure, Faris, television host Sara Haines, lawyer Sunny Hostin, and television personality Jedediah Bila. Additionally, Behar began moderating on Fridays in Goldberg's place. On October 27, Raven-Symoné left the show to star in a spin-off of the sitcom That's So Raven. On December 8, Bure left the program, citing the commute between coasts and her commitments to other television projects as reasons; her final episode as co-host aired the following day.

While Goldberg initially considered leaving after season 20, she remained as moderator for season 21, with Behar, Faris, Haines, Hostin, and Bila all returning as co-hosts. On September 18, 2017, Bila exited the show on air. Television personality Meghan McCain subsequently joined the show after leaving her position at Fox News, debuting as co-host on October 9. After giving birth to a daughter in December 2017, Haines returned from maternity leave in March 2018. Faris departed in July. In the same month, Haines left the show to co-host ABC's new third hour of its morning program Good Morning America; she made her final appearance during the season's penultimate broadcast on August 2.

Broadcast journalist Abby Huntsman joined the panel in season 22, making her debut during the season premiere on September 4, 2018. Following an absence due to the death of her father, McCain returned on October 8. Television personality Ana Navarro joined the show as a weekly guest co-host the following month. Goldberg began a hiatus from co-hosting on February 7, 2019, due to pneumonia and sepsis, and returned on March 14. Huntsman took maternity leave beginning in May. Behar, Goldberg, Hostin, McCain, and Huntsman all returned for the 23rd season, which premiered on September 3. In January 2020, Huntsman departed to become a senior advisor to her father's 2020 Utah gubernatorial election campaign; she made her final appearance as co-host on January 17.

Haines returned as a guest co-host beginning in March 2020 and permanently rejoined the panel at the launch of the 24th season. McCain gave birth to a daughter in September 2020 and returned in January 2021 after a three-month maternity leave. After four years on the series, McCain departed at the end of the 24th season. She attributed her decision to her desire to raise her daughter in Washington D.C., to which she had relocated. McCain later cited the "toxic, direct and purposeful hostility" she experienced at the show as the reason for her exit. In April 2022, Goldberg took an extended hiatus from co-hosting to film the Amazon Prime Video series Anansi Boys. Starting in season 26, Navarro, who has been a weekly guest co-host since 2018, and political strategist Alyssa Farah Griffin joined the show permanently. With the additions, the panel comprises six co-hosts.

== Production ==
During its first 17 seasons, The View was filmed in ABC Television Studio 23 in New York City. The original set for the first four seasons was a leftover set from canceled soap opera The City. The panelists conduct discussions around a table or on a sofa and wear IFB earpieces through which producers communicate with them. Bill Geddie, Barbara Walters' longtime producing partner, and Mark Gentile respectively served as showrunner and director for 17 years. Walters remained an executive producer until her death.

The View's 18th season brought significant changes in a "creative overhaul" as well as a "new direction" for the show. In August 2014, ABC named Bill Wolff, who had served as vice president of primetime programming at MSNBC and as executive producer of the news and opinion program The Rachel Maddow Show, the new executive producer, replacing Bill Geddie. Production of the show relocated to the ABC Broadcast Center on the Upper West Side of Manhattan. During the season premiere on September 15, 2014, the series unveiled its new studio featuring a coffee table-style desk with low-arm chairs, a large video wall, in-the-round audience seating, and an on-camera social media station. Subsequent tweaks included a glass desk and high stools at center stage, as well as color adjustments in backgrounds and graphics.

In October 2014, ABC shifted production oversight on The View from ABC's daytime entertainment division to Lincoln Square Productions, an ABC News subsidiary, where the show would be grouped under the division's non-fiction programming umbrella. The move allowed the show to leverage ABC News' resources toward news-related segments. In August 2015, former late-night talk show Late Show with David Letterman producer Brian Teta joined the show as co-executive producer. Later in the month, executive producer Wolff departed the show. In February 2016, along with the show's 20th season renewal, Candi Carter was promoted to executive producer after serving as interim showrunner for season 19, becoming the first African-American executive producer in the show's history.

During the 20th-season premiere on September 6, 2016, the show debuted an updated set design with muted colors, retooled opening titles with footage of the co-hosts in a loft-like space, as well as a new theme song entitled "World's Gone Crazy", written by Diane Warren and performed by Mary J. Blige. Hilary Estey McLoughlin was named senior executive producer in January 2017 after she was brought on as a consultant for season 19. In September, Teta was promoted to executive producer ahead of the 21st-season premiere. Sarah de la O serves as director, as of September 2019. In March 2020, the series began airing without a live studio audience as a precaution in light of the COVID-19 pandemic. Carter departed that same month to become the showrunner of the daytime talk show Tamron Hall. During the pandemic, the co-hosts broadcast from different locations, with Joy Behar, Whoopi Goldberg, Sunny Hostin, Meghan McCain, and Ana Navarro filming remotely, while Sara Haines remained in the studio, where Teta also still produced. McLoughlin exited in February 2021.

For the series' 25th season, which began in September 2021, the co-hosts returned to filming in front of a live studio audience for the first time since March 2020. The show also presented a new theme song entitled "For My Girls", written by Warren and performed by Brandy Norwood and Nicole Scherzinger.

For the series' 28th season, which premiered on September 3, 2024, The View relocated from the ABC Broadcast Center to Studio B of Disney's new 7 Hudson Square headquarters in Manhattan, serving as the first production to move to the new facility. The new studio extensively uses video walls along the walls and floors, allowing for more "dynamic" redressing of the entire set with different scenery using graphics. The existing desk was brought to the new studio, and was described as being the "jumping-off point" of the new studio's look and feel. The show also debuted a new theme song entitled "This Version", written by Warren and performed by Leona Lewis.

== Notable episodes ==
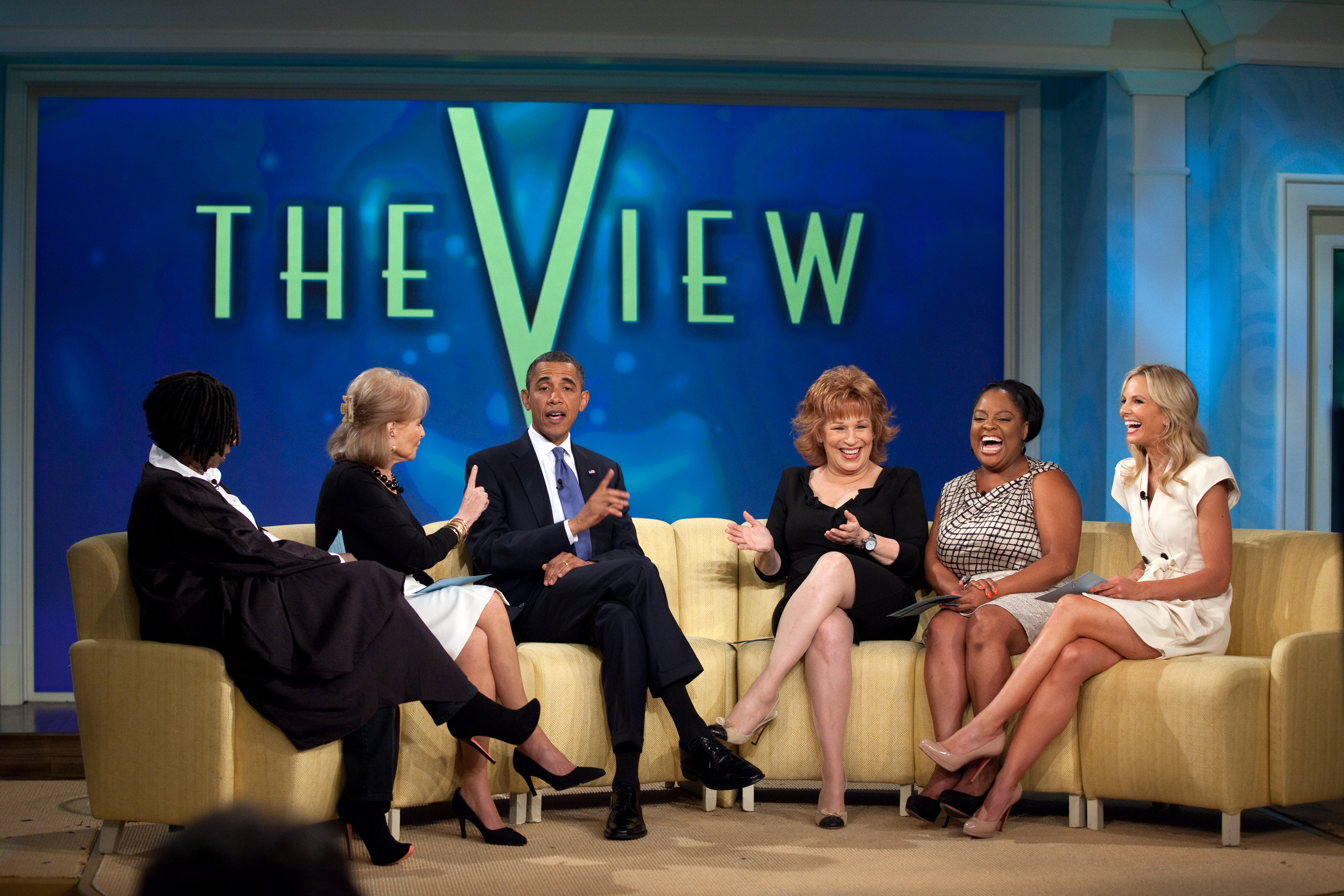
The co-hosts interview Barack Obama, President of the United States, on July 29, 2010.

In 2010, U.S. President Barack Obama appeared as a guest on the show during the July 29 broadcast, marking the first appearance on a daytime talk show by a sitting U.S. president. The episode also saw the return of Barbara Walters following her open heart surgery in May before she resumed her hiatus. On February 22, 2012, Star Jones came on as a guest and discussed her contentious exit from the show, marking her first appearance since said exit in 2006. On February 7, 2014, Rosie O'Donnell returned as a guest for the first time since quitting the show in 2007. All eleven co-hosts in the show's history appeared during Walters' penultimate episode as co-host on May 15 to celebrate her retirement. Walters' final appearance as co-host aired the following day; it featured several guests, including Hillary Clinton and television host Oprah Winfrey.

On March 27, 2015, the show celebrated its 4,000th broadcast, with Walters and Joy Behar returning for the celebration. On September 5, 2016, prior to the premiere of Season 20, ABC aired a documentary entitled The View: 20 Years in the Making, which featured notable moments from the show and several personalities involved in its history, hosted by Behar. On November 8, Behar, Jedediah Bila, Candace Cameron Bure, Sara Haines, and Sunny Hostin hosted a primetime Election Night special of the show, which aired on Lifetime. On November 11, the series aired a "Flashback Friday" episode, which featured the original panel of co-hosts comprising Behar, Jones, Meredith Vieira, and Debbie Matenopoulos as well as a Veteran's Day tribute.

In March 2017, the show had its first remote broadcast from Walt Disney World in Orlando, Florida. Five episodes were filmed in front of the Tree of Life at Disney's Animal Kingdom, featuring pre-recorded segments with Behar, Bila, Haines, Hostin, Paula Faris, and Whoopi Goldberg exploring Epcot, Magic Kingdom, and Disney's Hollywood Studios. Film director James Cameron came on as a guest on March 9, giving a preview of the themed area Pandora – The World of Avatar. Other guests included Sherri Shepherd, Tom Bergeron, actresses Ariel Winter, Audra McDonald, and Mandy Moore, actors John Stamos and Eric Stonestreet, and chefs Masaharu Morimoto and Art Smith, with musical performances by singer Andy Grammer and rock band Train.

On August 11, 2017, ABC re-aired the first episode of The View, which originally aired on the same date 20 years prior. On November 7, 2019, the series celebrated the airing of its 5,000th episode, with Bill Geddie, businessman Donald Trump Jr., and television personality Kimberly Guilfoyle appearing as guests. The following month, singer Darlene Love performed her song "Christmas (Baby Please Come Home)" alongside singer Jason Derulo on the December 20 broadcast, which Love has done annually since 2015. On March 11, 2020, the series aired its first broadcast without a live studio audience since its debut due to the COVID-19 pandemic.

On September 24, 2021, Hostin and Ana Navarro were removed from the show mid-broadcast due to testing positive for COVID-19 before a planned in-person interview with U.S. Vice President Kamala Harris. The rest of the episode saw Behar and Haines answering audience questions and Harris appearing from a separate room in the studio building via a video stream during the last ten minutes. Hostin and Navarro returned the following week and said further testing indicated the two had received false positive results.

On June 2, 2022, the show aired a taped segment of Behar, Matenopoulos, Jones, and Vieira reuniting to reminisce at Essex Hall, where the original auditions for co-hosts took place. On January 3, 2023, the show aired a tribute special for Walters following her death on December 30, 2022. Former co-hosts Matenopoulos, Shepherd, and Ling appeared live on the show with former co-hosts Jones and Hasselbeck appearing virtually and Vieira calling into the show. The series aired its 6,000th episode in July 2024.

=== Controversies ===
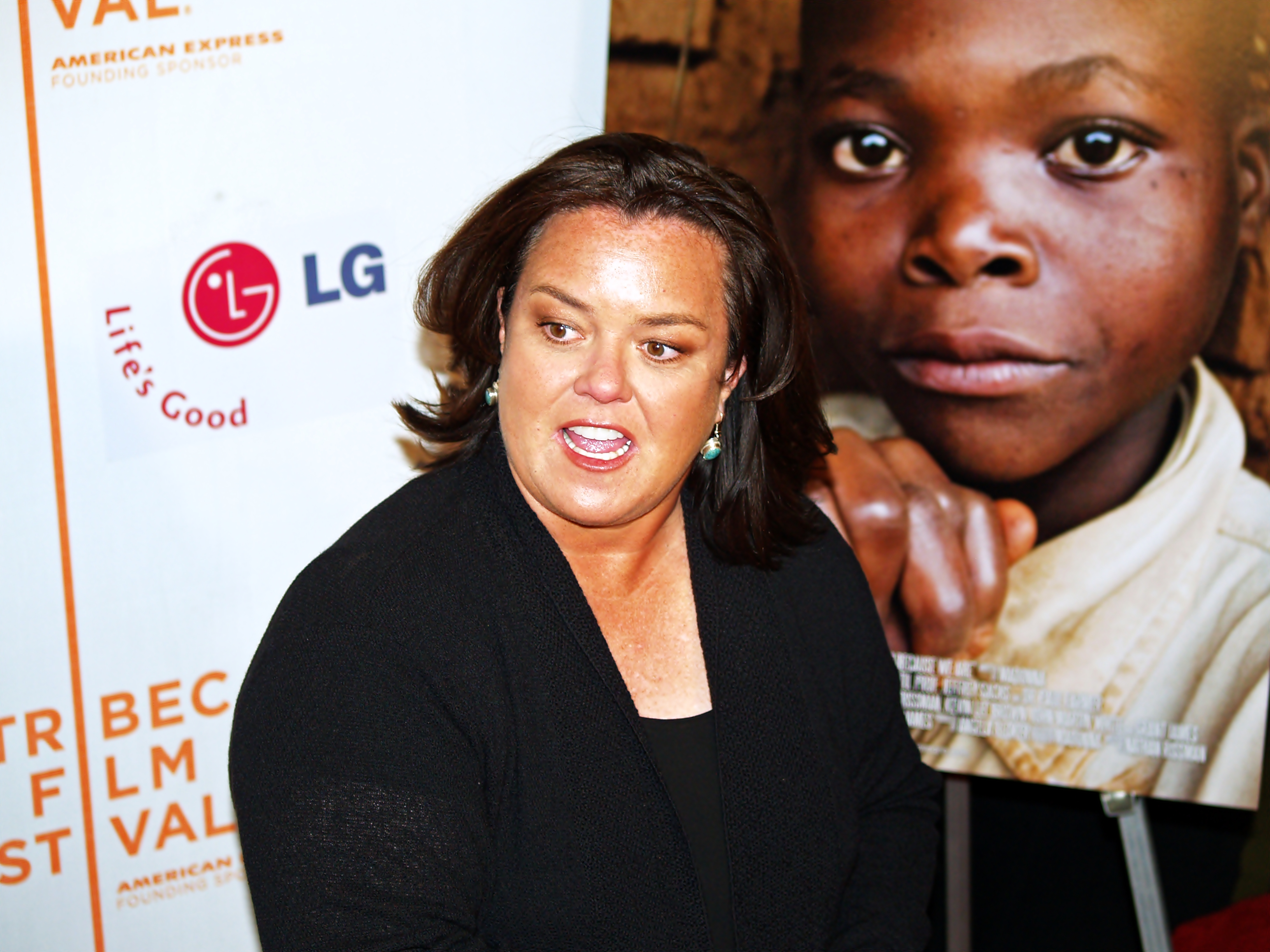
Rosie O'Donnell was involved in multiple controversies during her time on The View.

The show's tenth season was embroiled in controversies, such as O'Donnell "speaking in mock Chinese" as well as her public feud with businessman and later U.S. president Donald Trump. On May 17, 2007, O'Donnell sparked accusations of "equating American soldiers with terrorists" in relation to the Iraq War by asking, "655,000 Iraqi civilians are dead. Who are the terrorists?" Following frequent debates involving O'Donnell and Elisabeth Hasselbeck, a confrontation ensued between the two on May 23 due to O'Donnell's issue with Hasselbeck's lack of willingness to defend her right to criticize the war. O'Donnell also stated that the media would portray her as "big, fat, lesbian, loud Rosie attacking innocent, pure, Christian Elisabeth" and that Republican pundits were mischaracterizing her statements; Hasselbeck responded by telling O'Donnell to defend her own insinuations. O'Donnell exited the series two days later, three weeks earlier than scheduled. She later attributed her early exit to the use of a split screen during the confrontation.

During a discussion about the 89th Miss America pageant on September 14, 2015, Michelle Collins called contestant Kelley Johnson's monologue about her occupation as a registered nurse "hilarious", stating that Johnson "read her emails out loud", while Behar referenced Johnson's attire and questioned why she had on "a doctor's stethoscope". The remarks resulted in an immediate social media backlash from the nursing profession, including the hashtag #NursesUnite. Two days later, Collins and Behar addressed the controversy on air. Consequently, pharmaceutical corporation Johnson & Johnson and egg company Eggland's Best pulled their sponsorships from the series, later followed by food company McCormick & Company, laundry brand Snuggle, and party store chain Party City.

On February 13, 2018, while analyzing television personality Omarosa's comments in regards to U.S. Vice President Mike Pence's religiosity, Behar stated: "It's one thing to talk to Jesus, it's another thing when Jesus talks to you. That's called mental illness, if I'm not correct, hearing voices." Content analysis organization Media Research Center subsequently launched a campaign demanding an apology from Behar and urging viewers to do the same, resulting in 40,000 calls to ABC as well as 6,000 complaints to the show's advertisers. Pence himself responded and accused the show of expressing religious intolerance. The Walt Disney Company CEO Bob Iger later stated that Behar has directly apologized to Pence. On March 13, Behar issued an apology on air and said: "I think Vice President Pence is right; I was raised to respect everyone's religious faith, and I fell short of that. I sincerely apologize for what I said."

In February 2022, president of ABC News Kim Godwin suspended Goldberg from the show for two weeks after she stated during an episode that the Holocaust was "not about race".

During a 2026 appearance on The View, Pam Grier claimed to have seen lynched bodies during her childhood in Columbus, Ohio. These comments stirred controversy, as America's Black Holocaust Museum reports that the final recorded lynching in Ohio took place in 1911, decades before Grier's birth.

== Other media ==
In 2016, VH1 picked up Daytime Divas, a television series adaptation of Star Jones' book Satan's Sisters, which revolves around a fictional daytime talk show named The Lunch Hour featuring five female co-hosts. Jones, who was also one of the series' executive producers, and then-View co-hosts Joy Behar, Jedediah Bila, Sara Haines, and Sunny Hostin all made guest appearances on the series. It was canceled in 2017 after one season.

In September 2018, The View began a podcast that saw the release of each episode in the show after its original televised broadcast. In September 2021, the series launched a companion podcast titled Behind the Table, which features conversations between former and current co-hosts. ABC began releasing episodes of Behind the Table daily in September 2023.

In April 2019, Thomas Dunne Books published a non-fiction book entitled Ladies Who Punch by journalist Ramin Setoodeh, which chronicles the entire history of the show. It features interviews with various current and former View co-hosts. The book is set to be adapted into a television miniseries.

In January 2025, ABC News Live announced that The View would expand to a weekend edition titled The Weekend View where it airs on the streaming platform which debuted January 11.

== Criticism and reception ==
=== Critical response ===
A New York Times review, published ten days after the show premiered, describes what critic Caryn James thought was distinctive about the show:

The idea of women talking to one another on daytime television is not exactly radical. The idea that those women should be smart and accomplished is still odd enough to make The View seem wildly different. It actively defies the bubbleheads-'R'-us approach to women's talk shows.

In a 2001 profile of Barbara Walters for Vanity Fair, James Wolcott called The View a "genius bit of television". The following year, Virginia Heffernan of Slate complimented the chemistry between Walters, Meredith Vieira, Star Jones, and Joy Behar, writing that the women "have eased completely into the stock sensibility of middle-aged talk shows, embracing the imperatives that one be healthy, careful, temperate, charitable, and moderately cutesy while at the same time skeptical, ribald, and world-weary". Ken Tucker of Entertainment Weekly praised the show in 2007, writing that it "does for daytime what The Daily Show does for nighttime: It reflects the pent-up frustrations, pleasures, and hostilities its audience has toward pop and political culture."

Despite being credited for helping the show achieve higher ratings, Rosie O'Donnell received criticism from "viewers and interest groups" that disagreed with her viewpoints. The Atlantic's Kevin O'Keefe deemed O'Donnell's hiring as moderator "somewhat curious" due to her being "such an outspoken individual". Conversely, Helena Andrews of Politico praised O'Donnell for making the show "actually watchable—something no longer relegated to the ether of TiVo or sneaked through head phones at work when we should be watching CNN". In 2014, Michael Schulman of The New Yorker highlighted O'Donnell's first tenure, elaborating that she "pushed the limits of what cheery daytime chatter could sustain, and The View became more heated and more interesting as a result".

Jenny McCarthy's appointment as a co-host attracted backlash due to her anti-vaccination views. Writing as a senior science editor for HuffPost, David Freeman referenced science communicator Bill Nye's concern that McCarthy would "encourage parents to prevent their kids from getting vaccinated" as well has his hope that her views would be "discredited". Alex Pareene of Salon criticized the decision, writing that McCarthy "isn't just quirky—she spreads lies that hurt people". Jill Filipovic remarked on The Guardian that McCarthy "has no record of political activism or even serious engagement with the world" other than her anti-vaccination stance. The New Yorker's Michael Specter asserted that ABC executives "should be ashamed of themselves for offering McCarthy a regular platform on which she can peddle denialism and fear to the parents of young children who may have legitimate questions about vaccine safety" and that her hiring was a "strike against reason and progress and hope".

Following Walters' retirement, the show became known for constant changes in its lineup of co-hosts, including the brief tenures of O'Donnell, McCarthy, Rosie Perez, Nicolle Wallace, and Michelle Collins. In July 2015, Daniel D'Addario of Time suggested that it was time for ABC to end The View, citing the show's inability to sustain a consistent panel as a factor. The following year, Deadline Hollywood's Lisa de Moraes wrote that the series was "gaining a reputation as one of the riskier gigs for on-air talent".

In 2017, David Bauder of the Associated Press attributed the series' resurgence in viewership to its political discussions. HuffPost's David Hinckley opined that The View has been successful in implementing its original premise and maintaining "a balance in areas like ethnicity and ideology" in regards to its co-hosts. Writing for The New York Times in May 2019, Amanda FitzSimons cited the fascination with the co-hosts as what sets the show apart from other entertainment and news programs and noted that it "remains one of the few places on TV where audiences can watch authentic human drama". Lorraine Ali of the Los Angeles Times praised the series for being "one of the few places left on TV where liberal, conservative and moderate voices pose questions that real folks might ask" and generating "raw moments that are as authentic as they are viral". In July 2021, Variety columnist Daniel D'Addario found that the show had lost its "crackling electricity" and that the co-hosts had "veered into a place that wasn't even good TV" due to the limitations of taping remotely in response to the COVID-19 pandemic.

In July 2025, the conservative Media Research Center released a study showing that 102 liberal-leaning guests and no conservative-leaning guests had been invited to the show during the first six months of 2025, a sharp departure from previous seasons.

=== U.S. television ratings ===
The tenth season of The View averaged 3.5 million viewers per episode, with the season premiere being the series' most watched at 4.4 million viewers. In November 2008, the show's post-election day telecast garnered the biggest audience in its history at 6.2 million in viewers, becoming the week's most-watched program in daytime television. It was surpassed by the broadcast on July 29, 2010, which featured President Barack Obama's first appearance as a guest and garnered 6.6 million viewers. In 2013, the show averaged 3.1 million daily viewers, which outpaced rival talk show The Talk. It averaged 4.1 million viewers during Walters' final week in May 2014, with the episode featuring a farewell to Walters on May 16 garnering 5.2 million viewers and ranking as the show's fourth most-watched broadcast.

The season 18 premiere in September 2014 drew the show's second largest season premiere audience to date of 3.902 million viewers. The ratings declined following the premiere, with those in the demographic of women 25–54 "pacing downward for the fourth straight season" and being 30 percent lower from five years prior. The ratings in the same demographic in January 2015 were down nine percent from the year prior. Season 19 averaged 2.757 million viewers per episode. The show averaged 2.94 million viewers during the first week of November 2016. Its viewership during season 20 had been up five percent from the previous season by April 2017.

The 21st season attained the show's highest ratings since Walters' retirement, averaging 2.9 million viewers per episode. Its 5,000th episode, which aired in November 2019, garnered 3.021 million viewers. The series was one of the top five daytime talk shows in the U.S., with an average of 2.5 million daily viewers, as of January 2020. During the November 2020 sweeps period, it averaged 3.048 million viewers. The View was the daytime talk or news program to obtain the highest number of total viewers during its 24th season, averaging 2.743 million viewers. As part of the 2022–2023 television season, the 26th season averaged 2.375 million viewers and ranked No. 1 in total viewers among all daytime talk programs. It was the series' third consecutive year in the position. At November 2025, the series was still getting c. 2.46 million viewers.

=== Accolades ===
Since debuting in 1997, The View has garnered various awards and honors, among them are 30 Daytime Emmy Awards (as of 2017), which include Outstanding Talk Show, Outstanding Informative Talk Show, and Outstanding Talk Show Host for Walters, Behar, Whoopi Goldberg, Elisabeth Hasselbeck, and Sherri Shepherd, and three NAACP Image Awards. In addition, the show has received nominations for People's Choice Awards, GLAAD Media Awards, and a Critics' Choice Television Award.

== See also ==
- The Talk (talk show)
- Loose Women
