= Coco Austin =

American television personality (born 1979)

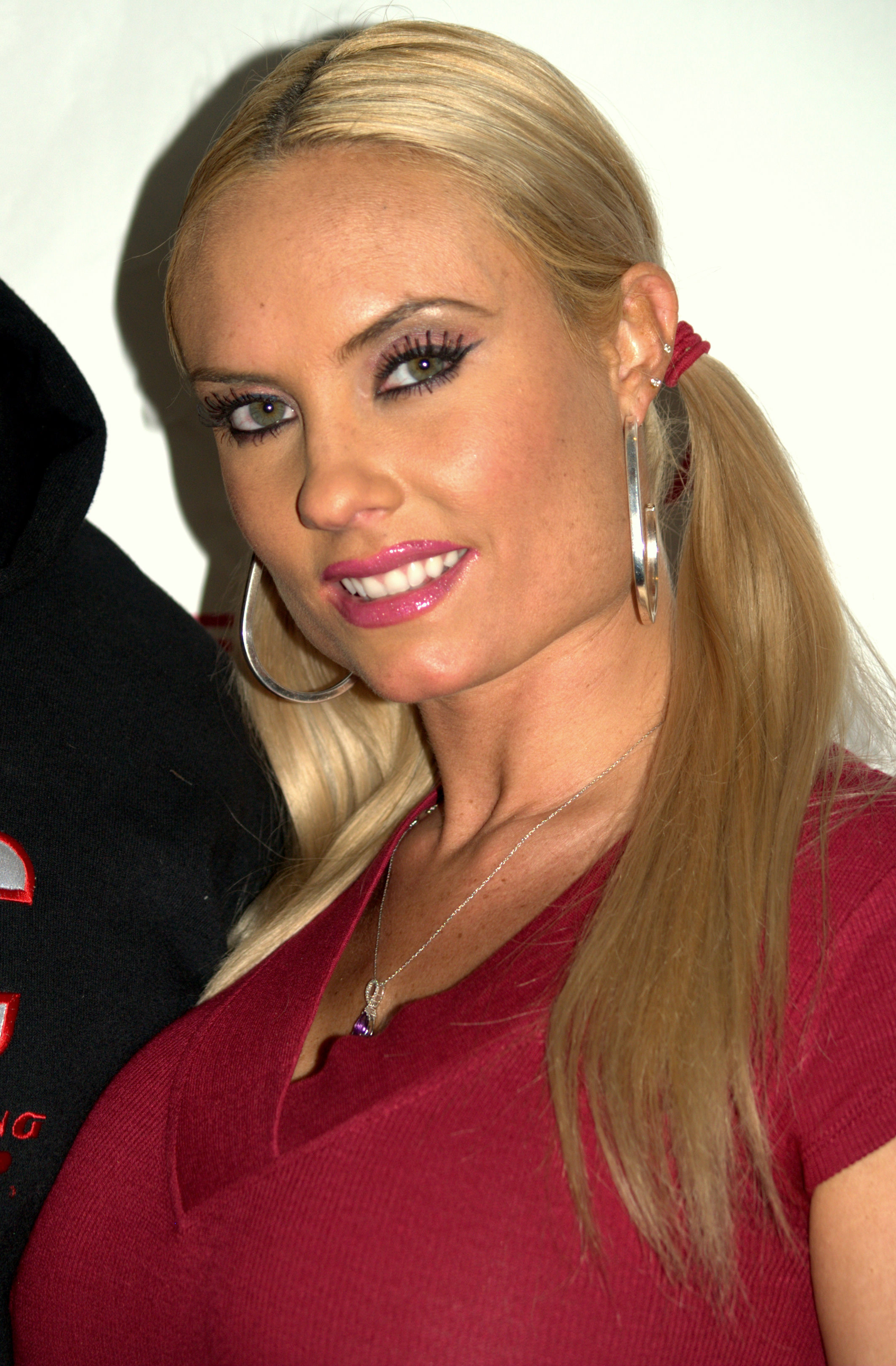
- Austin in 2009
- Born: Nicole Natalie Austin; March 17, 1979 (age 47); Tarzana, California, U.S.
- Other names: Coco Marie, Coco-T, Coco Marie Austin
- Occupations: TV personality, actress, model, dancer
- Years active: 1997–present
- Spouses: Mike Williams (m. 1999; div. 2001) Ice-T (m. 2002)
- Children: 1
- Website: cocosworld.com

Nicole Natalie Marrow (née Austin; born March 17, 1979), commonly known as Coco Austin, Coco, Coco Marie Austin, Coco Marie, and Coco-T, is an American television personality, actress and model. She has been married to rapper Ice-T since 2002.

== Early life ==
Austin was born in March 1979 in Tarzana, California, and raised in nearby Palos Verdes. She has Serbian ancestry through maternal grandparents born in Serbia. She has a younger sister, Kristy Williams, and three younger brothers. As a small child, her brother mispronounced her name, saying "Cole Cole" or "Co-co" in place of "Nicole", and eventually her family began calling her that. The family moved to Albuquerque, New Mexico, when she was ten. She grew up as a tomboy, riding all-terrain vehicles and playing football. She also began dancing during her childhood (jazz, tap and ballet).

== Career ==
At 18, Austin began specializing in swimsuit, lingerie and body modeling for calendars, catalogs and videos. In 1997, she appeared on her first magazine cover for Swimwear Illustrated. She won the 1998 Miss Ujena contest in Mexico. In 2001, she began working events and parties at the Playboy Mansion. She appeared in low-budget R-rated films, including Southwest Babes (2001), Desert Rose (2002), and The Dirty Monks (2004).

Austin has made guest appearances on TV shows and specials including Hip-Hop Wives, the Comedy Central Roast of Flavor Flav, RuPaul's Drag Race 5 ("Draggle Rock"), The Late Late Show with Craig Ferguson, The Dr. Oz Show and Law & Order: Special Victims Unit.

She was featured in a layout in the March 2008 issue of Playboy magazine and had a role in the film Thira (a.k.a. Santorini Blue, which co-starred her husband, rapper-actor Ice-T). She appeared on NBC's game show Celebrity Family Feud on June 24, 2008, where she and Ice-T competed against Joan and Melissa Rivers and donated their winnings to charity.

Austin played the lead role of Bo Peep in the Las Vegas revue Peepshow from December 2012 to September 1, 2013, replacing Holly Madison.

Austin and Ice-T starred in the reality television series Ice Loves Coco, which premiered June 12, 2011, on E! It ran for three seasons, ending in February 2014. After its cancelation, tabloids reported that Austin and Ice-T were preparing to launch another reality series under Ryan Seacrest's production company. She also made an appearance in rapper Lil' Kim's music video for her single "Go Awff" in 2019.

== Personal life ==
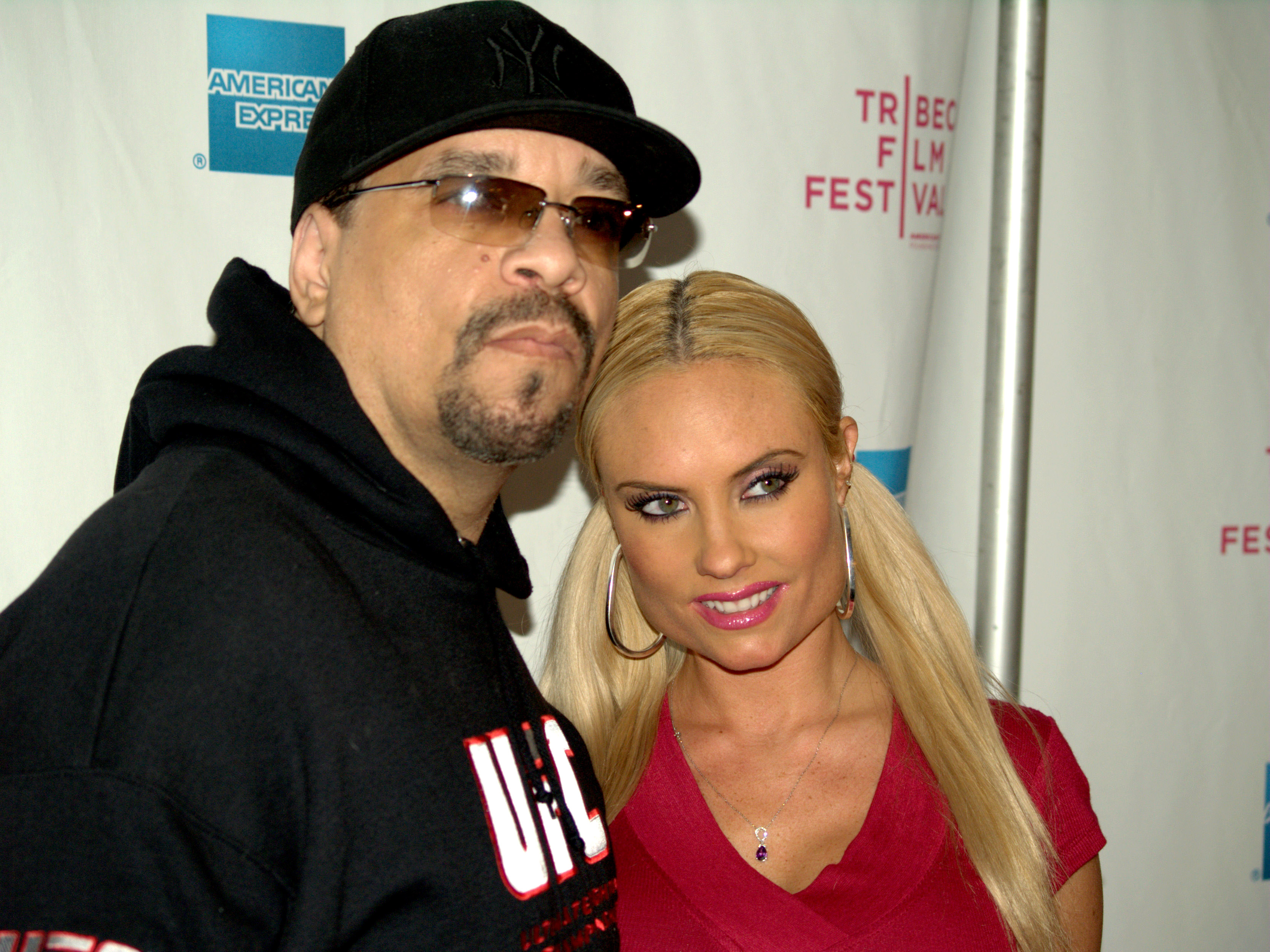
Austin with Ice-T

Austin was married to Mike Williams from 1999 to 2001.

Austin and rapper-actor Tracy "Ice-T" Marrow were married in January 2002. They renewed their vows in Hollywood on June 4, 2011. In 2006, they made their home in a penthouse apartment they owned in North Bergen, New Jersey. In 2012, they began building a five-bedroom house in Edgewater, New Jersey, which was expected to be completed by the end of that year.

On November 28, 2015, they had a daughter, Chanel Nicole.
