= Keke Palmer discography =

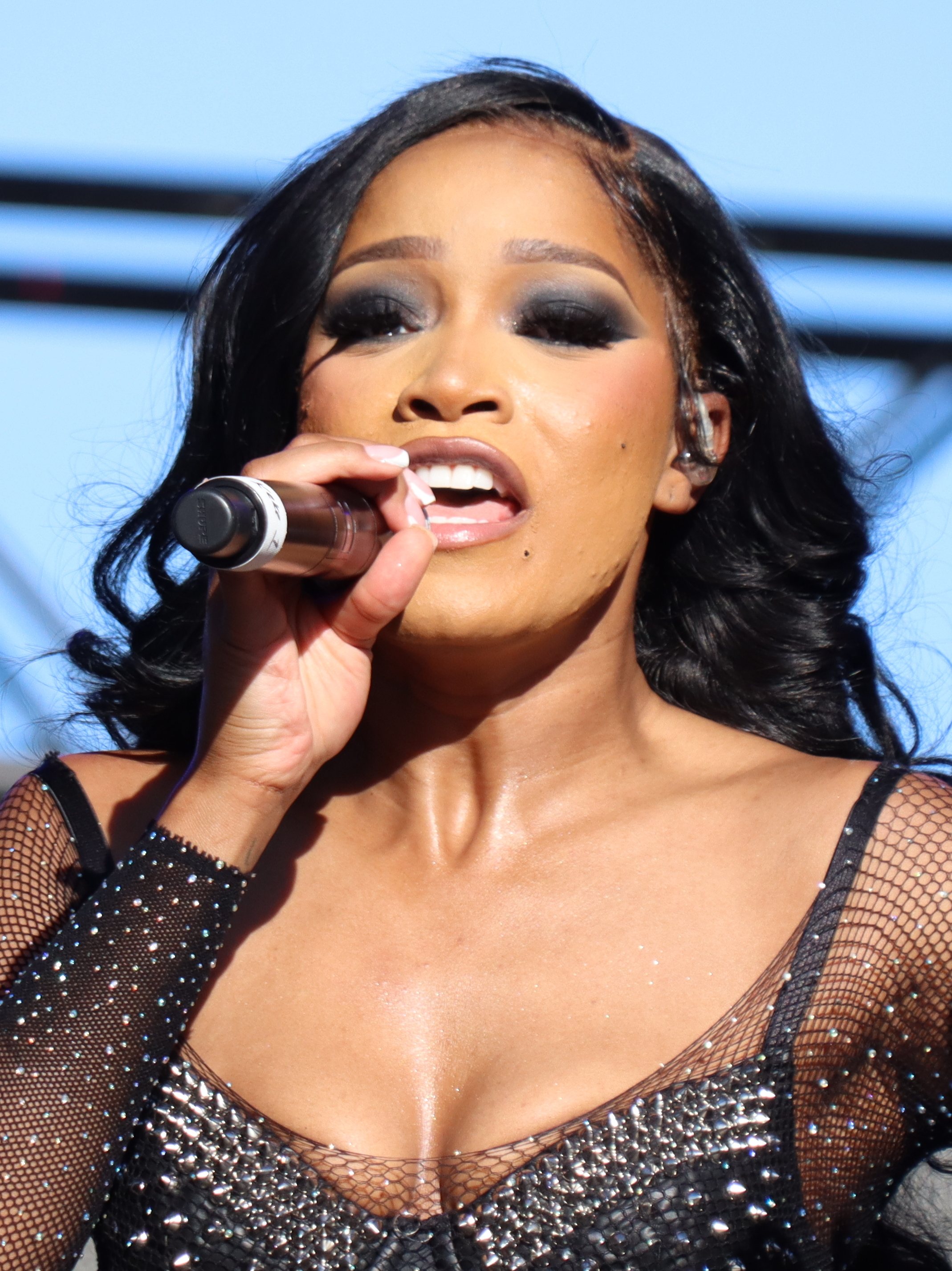
- Palmer performing in 2024
- Studio albums: 3
- Extended plays: 5
- Compilation albums: 1
- Singles: 28
- Music videos: 18
- Mixtapes: 3
- Promotional singles: 14

American R&B singer-songwriter Keke Palmer has released three studio albums, five extended plays, three mixtapes and 28 singles. In 2005, she signed a record deal with Atlantic Records. Palmer released her debut album So Uncool on September 18, 2007. The album failed to chart on the US Billboard 200, but did chart at number 85 on the R&B chart. The album was preceded by the second single "Keep It Movin'". In 2010, Palmer was signed by the Chairman of Interscope Records, Jimmy Iovine, and began working on an album.

In January 2011, Palmer released her first mixtape Awaken. The mixtape was officially released on January 10, 2011, for downloading from mixtape-downloading websites. The first and only single released from the mixtape was "The One You Call". A music video was also released for the song. In July 2012, Palmer released the single "You Got Me" featuring Kevin McCall. The video for the single was released on July 11, 2012. Palmer released a self-titled mixtape Keke Palmer on October 1, 2012. It included her previously released singles "You Got Me" and "Dance Alone".

== Albums ==
=== Studio albums ===
List of studio albums, with selected chart positions
Title	Studio album details	Peak chart positions	
Title	Studio album details	US Heat.	US R&B HH
So Uncool	Released: September 18, 2007; Formats: CD, digital download; Label: Atlantic	26	85
Big Boss	Released: May 12, 2023; Label: Big Bosses Entertainment; Formats: Digital download, streaming	—	—
Just Keke	Released: June 20, 2025; Formats: CD, LP, digital download, streaming; Label: Big Bosses Entertainment, The SRG/ILS Group	—	—

=== Compilation albums ===
List of compilation albums
Title	Compilation album details
Waited to Exhale (Note: This album was previously unreleased. Recorded from 2009-2010, Palmer was unable to release it until 2016.)	Released: June 26, 2016; Label: Self-released; Formats: Streaming

=== Soundtrack albums ===
List of soundtracks
Title	Soundtrack details
Rags (Music from the Original Movie)	Released: May 22, 2012; Formats: Digital download; Label: Nickelodeon

== Mixtapes ==
List of mixtapes
Title	Mixtape details
Awaken	Released: March 18, 2011; Formats: Digital download; Label: Independent
Keke Palmer	Released: October 1, 2012; Formats: Digital download, streaming; Label: Interscope
KeyanaNikole (with Jane Handcock)	Released: July 7, 2017; Formats: Digital download; Label: Independent

=== Reissues ===
List of reissues
Title	Mixtape details
Awaken Reloaded	Released: August 22, 2011; Formats: Digital download; Label: Independent

== Extended plays ==
List of extended plays, with selected chart positions
Title	Extended play details	Peak chart positions	
Title	Extended play details	US R&B HH	US Heat.
Keke Palmer	Released: July 17, 2007; Format: Digital download; Label: Atlantic	—	—
Lauren	Released: November 4, 2016; Format: Digital download; Label: Island	42	22
Virgo Tendencies, Pt. 1	Released: August 28, 2020; Format: Digital download, streaming; Label: Big Bosses	—	—
Virgo Tendencies, Pt. 2	Released: December 11, 2020; Format: Digital download, streaming; Label: Big Bosses	—	—
DivaGurl: A Story By Keke Palmer (with DivaGurl)	Released: January 17, 2025; Format: Digital download, streaming; Label: Big Bosses	—	—
"—" denotes releases that did not chart or were not released in that territory.

== Singles ==
=== As lead artist ===
List of singles as lead artist, with selected chart positions, showing year released and album name
Title	Year	Peak chart positions		Album
Title	Year	US Bub.	US Main. R&B/HH	Album
"It's My Turn Now"	2007	2	—	Jump In!
"Footwurkin'"	2007	—	—	So Uncool
"Keep It Movin'" (featuring Big Meech)	2007	—	—	So Uncool
"The One You Call"	2010	—	—	Awaken
"The Greatest"	2011	—	—	Awaken Reloaded
"Walls Come Down"	2011	—	—	Awaken Reloaded
"You Got Me" (featuring Kevin McCall)	2012	—	—	Keke Palmer
"Dance Alone"	2012	—	—	Keke Palmer
"I Don't Belong to You"	2015	—	—	Non-album singles
"Enemiez" (featuring Jeremih)	2016	—	—	Non-album singles
"Wind Up" (featuring Quavo)	2017	—	—	Non-album singles
"Bossy"	2018	—	32	Non-album singles
"Better to Have Loved"	2018	—	—	Non-album singles
"Virgo Tendencies"	2020	—	—	Non-album singles
"Got Em Mad" (featuring TK Kravitz)	2020	—	—	Non-album singles
"FYG"	2020	—	—	Virgo Tendencies Part 2
"Sticky"	2020	—	—	Virgo Tendencies Part 1
"Thick"	2020	—	—	Virgo Tendencies Part 1
"Snack"	2020	—	—	Virgo Tendencies Part 1
"Dreamcatcher"	2020	—	—	Virgo Tendencies Part 1
"Want Me to Be" (with Mae Seven)	2020	—	—	Non-album single
"Hooked"	2020	—	—	Virgo Tendencies Part 2
"Bottoms Up 2.0"	2022	—	—	Non-album single
"Standards"	2023	—	—	Big Boss
"Waiting"	2023	—	—	Big Boss
"FR FR"	2023	—	—	Big Boss
"Love Like This"	2023	—	—	Big Boss
"Assets"	2023	—	—	Big Boss
"Serious"	2023	—	—	Big Boss
"Ungorgeous"	2023	—	—	Big Boss
"Little Do You Know (Piano Diaries)" (with Toby Gad & Aloe Blacc)	2024	—	—	Piano Diaries - The Hits
"S.O.B." (with DivaGurl)	2024	—	—	DivaGurl: A Story by Keke Palmer
"Rock with You" (with DivaGurl)	2024	—	—	DivaGurl: A Story by Keke Palmer
"The Master"	2024	—	—	Non-album single
"Afford It" (with DivaGurl)	2025	—	—	DivaGurl: A Story by Keke Palmer
"Imposter"	2025	—	—	Non-album single
"125 Degrees"	2025	—	—	Just Keke
"My Confessions"	2025	—	—	Just Keke
"Off Script"	2025	—	—	Just Keke
"—" denotes releases that did not chart or were not released in that territory.

=== As featured artist ===
List of singles as featured artist, with selected chart positions, showing year released and album name
Title	Year	Peak chart positions	Album
Title	Year	US R&B/HH Dig.	Album
"Ride" (JRD featuring Keke Palmer and Jane Handcock)	2018	—	Non-album singles
"Recipe" (Star cast featuring Keke Palmer)	2019	—	Non-album singles
"Try" (Star cast featuring Ryan Destiny, Brittany O'Grady and Keke Palmer)	2019	—	Non-album singles
"Giants" (True Damage featuring Becky G, Keke Palmer, Soyeon, Duckwrth and Thutmose)	2019	19	Non-album singles
"Deep Water" (A-Lex featuring Keke Palmer)	2020	—	From a Seed
"Hood Bitch" (Fam0us.Twinsss featuring Keke Palmer)	2021	—	Non-album single
"—" denotes releases that did not chart or were not released in that territory.

=== Promotional singles ===
List of promotional singles, with selected chart positions, showing year released and album name
Title	Year	Peak chart positions	Album
Title	Year	US Kid	Album
"Tonight" (featuring Cham)	2006	—	Night at the Museum
"Skin Deep"	2007	—	So Uncool
"We Are"	2012	—	Non-album promotional singles
"Me and You Against the World" (Rags cast featuring Keke Palmer and Max Schneider)	2012	2	Rags
"L.O.V.E. (Let One Voice Emerge)" (Fergie featuring Patti Austin, Sheila E., Judith Hill, Siedah Garrett, Lalah Hathaway and Keke Palmer)	2012	—	Non-album promotional singles
"Work Like You Love Me"	2013	—	Non-album promotional singles
"Animal"	2014	—	Non-album promotional singles
"Just Keke (Theme)"	2014	—	Non-album promotional singles
"Yellow Lights"	2016	—	Non-album promotional singles
"Many Things"	2016	—	Non-album promotional singles
"Reverse Psychology"	2016	—	Non-album promotional singles
"Pregame"	2017	—	Non-album promotional singles
"Twerk n Flirt"	2019	—	Virgo Tendencies: Part 1
"Actually Vote"	2020	—	Non-album promotional single
"Christmas (Baby Please Come Home)" (featuring Scarlett Johansson, Taron Egerton, Reese Witherspoon and Tori Kelly)	2021	—	Sing 2
"Christmas Kisses" (with Adam Blacktone)	2023	—	A Legacy Christmas
"100% Black-Owned" (featuring Crystal Waters)	2023	—	Non-album single
"—" denotes releases that did not chart or were not released in that territory. "*" denotes the chart did not exist at that time.

== Other charted songs ==
List of other charted songs, with selected chart positions, showing year released and album name
Title	Year	Peak chart positions			Album
Title	Year	US Christian Dig.	US Gospel Dig.	US Kid	Album
"Man in the Mirror"	2012	7	2	—	Joyful Noise
"Maybe I'm Amazed" (with Jeremy Jordan)	2012	19	3	—	Joyful Noise
"Higher Medley" (with Queen Latifah, Dolly Parton, Jeremy Jordan, Angela Grovey, DeQuina Moore and Andy Karl)	2012	4	1	—	Joyful Noise
"He's Everything" (with Dolly Parton, Queen Latifah, Jeremy Jordan, Andy Karl and DeQuina Moore)	2012	—	15	—	Joyful Noise
"Love You Hate You" (Rags cast featuring Keke Palmer)	2012	—	—	9	Rags
"Stand Out" (Rags cast featuring Keke Palmer)	2012	—	—	15	Rags
"Perfect Harmony" (Rags cast featuring Keke Palmer and Max Schneider)	2012	—	—	17	Rags
"Look at Me Now" (Rags cast featuring Keke Palmer)	2012	—	—	5	Rags
"—" denotes releases that did not chart.

== Other appearances ==
Title	Year	Other artist(s)	Album
"All My Girlz"	2006	—N/a	Akeelah and the Bee
"Jumpin"	2007	—N/a	Jump In!
"True to Your Heart"	2007	—N/a	Disneymania 5
"Home for the Holidays"	2007	—N/a	Disney Channel Holiday
"Reflection"	2008	—N/a	DisneyMania 6
"Come On, Come On"	2008	—N/a	Hello World
"Super Jerkin'"	2009	—N/a	The Party Album Vol. 58
"I'm Yours"	2012	DeQuina Moore; Angela Grovey	Joyful Noise
"Missing You"	2012	Scooter Smiff	First Period
"Things Aren't Always What They Seem"	2012	Rags cast Max Schneider	Rags
"Freddy My Love"	2016	Kether Donohue; Vanessa Hudgens; Carly Rae Jepsen	Grease: Live
"Look at Me I'm Sandra Dee"	2016	Kether Donohue; Vanessa Hudgens; Carly Rae Jepsen	Grease: Live
"She Put My Shirt Outside"	2016	Nick Cannon	The Gospel of Ike Turn Up
"Dirty"	2016	TeeFLii	AnnieRUO'TAY 5 (What Happened to TeeFLii?)
"Property"	2018	TK Kravitz	2.0
"Are You in Love (Or Just An Asshole)?"	2022	Brandon Kyle Goodman, Jemaine Clement	Human Resources (Soundtrack from the Netflix Series)
"Have a Little Hope"	2023	Niecy Nash	Human Resources: Season 2 (Soundtrack from the Netflix Series)
"Who am I?"	2023	—N/a	Human Resources: Season 2 (Soundtrack from the Netflix Series)
"I Choose Love"	2023	Randall Park, Maria Bamford, Rosie Perez, Maya Rudolph, Mark Rivers, Nick Kroll, Aidy Bryant, Brandon Kyle Goodman, David Thewlis, Gil Ozeri, Joe Wengert, Cole Escola	Human Resources: Season 2 (Soundtrack from the Netflix Series)

== Music videos ==
Main artist

List of music videos, showing year released and director
Title	Year	Director
"Keep It Movin'"	2007	James Larese
"The One You Call"	2010	Gabe Evans and Ryan Parma
"You Got Me"	2012	Harmony Samuels
"Dance Alone"	2012	CGT Productions
"The Other Side"	2013	Kurt Hugo Schneider
"Animal"	2014	Brett Simmons
"I Don't Belong to You"	2015	Jim Swaffield
"Enemiez"	2016	Carly Cussen
"Many Things"	2016	Lawrence Murray
"Yellow Lights"	2016	Rosero McCoy
"Paradise"	2016	Flashy
"Hands Free"	2016	Rosero McCoy
"Pressure"	2016	Rosero McCoy
"Jealous"	2016	Rosero McCoy
"Got Me Fucked Up"	2016	Rosero McCoy
"Doubtful"	2016	Rosero McCoy
"Wind Up"	2017	Dale Resteghini
"Pregame"	2017	Rosero McCoy
"Better To Have Loved"	2019	Lawrence S. Murray
"Got Em Mad"	2020	Derek Blanks
"Sticky (Remix) "	2020	Rosero McCoy
"Thick"	2020	Rosero McCoy
"Snack"	2020	Rosero McCoy
"Virgo Tendencies"	2020	Lawrence S. Murray
"Dreamcatcher"	2020	Kyle Sauer
"Actually Vote"	2020	Jake Wilson
"Want Me To Be"	2020	Fernando Toussaint
"Hooked"	2020	Lawrence S. Murray
"Bottoms Up 2.0"	2022	Lawrence S. Murray

Guest appearances

List of music videos, showing year released and director
Title	Year	Director	Notes
"Runaway Love"	2007	Jessy Terrero	Ludacris' music video
"Drop That Kitty"	2015	Shomi Patwary	Ty Dolla Sign, Charli XCX and Tinashe's music video
"The Most"	2016	J.A.T.H.A.N.	Rich Homie Quan's music video

== Notes ==
Notes
