= 53rd Daytime Creative Arts & Lifestyle Emmy Awards =

- Date: October 30, 2026
- Location: Hollywood Palladium; Los Angeles, California, U.S.
- Presented by: National Academy of Television Arts and Sciences (NATAS)
- Hosted by: Matthew Hoffman
- Most awards: The Kelly Clarkson Show (4)

Television/radio coverage
- Network: watch.theemmys.tv (online only)
- Produced by: Adam Sharp (NATAS); Lisa Armstrong (NATAS)

The 53rd Daytime Creative Arts & Lifestyle Emmy Awards, presented by the National Academy of Television Arts and Sciences (NATAS), was held on October 30, 2026, at the Hollywood Palladium in Los Angeles, California. During the gala, the NATAS presented Daytime Emmys honoring daytime television in 2025.

== Ceremony information ==
The 53rd edition, that covered an eligibility calendar of January 1, 2025 to December 31, 2025, recognizes daytime dramas, talk series, entertainment news, culinary, adventure, instructional and legal/courtroom programming. Formerly held in June, the Daytime Emmys moved to mid-fall the previous year; the 2026 event was held as a single ceremony on October 30, at the Hollywood Palladium in Los Angeles. Guidelines state that "in any category where there are fewer than ten submissions, no more than 50% of submitted entries may be nominated. This is a longstanding rule that the National Awards Committee is enforcing across all competitions to ensure the integrity of NATAS competitions and maintain the reputation of excellence for nominees." There was no host for the ceremony and was announced by Matthew Hoffman.

=== Category changes ===
- Elimination of a category: Science and Nature. Programs are now eligible to submit in Primetime, News and Documentary or Children's and Family Emmys depending on eligibility.
- Episode-Based Submissions: Submissions now episode-based allowing programs to enter multiple submissions for different episodes and potentially receive several nominations.
- NATAS has opted to determine how many nominations a category is based on a scale of how may submissions there were.
- Joint Drama/Non-Fiction Categories: Daytime dramas and non-fiction programs now enter alongside each other in categories except writing and directing.
- Guest Performer In a Daytime Drama: To be eligible, the person must be seen in a maximum of 19% of episodes aired/streamed for the first time during 2025. Otherwise submissions are entered for other categories.
- Redefining Multi-Cam and Single-Cam: Programs are now classified as "studio or non-studio".
- Members-Only Judging: Judges must now be members of either NATAS, the Television Academy, or dual members will automatically be approved to judge.

== Winners and Nominees ==
The nominees for the 53rd Daytime Creative Arts & Lifestyle Emmy Awards were announced on July 14, 2026. Winners are listed first, highlighted in boldface, and indicated with a double dagger (‡). Outstanding Regional Content in a Daytime Genre was awarded the Crystal Pillar. To qualify, a program must have already won at its respective regional chapter contest within specific eligible genres, including Lifestyle, Magazine, Entertainment, and Arts/Entertainment (Long or Short Form).

=== Programming ===
Programming
**Outstanding Lifestyle Program**: **A Different Breed (Amazon Prime Video)**‡; George to the Rescue (NBC); With Love, Meghan (Netflix); The Motherhood (Hallmark Channel); The Wizard of Paws (BYUtv)	**Outstanding Legal/Courtroom Program**: **Justice for the People with Judge Milian (Syndication)**‡; Caught in Providence (Syndication); Divorce Court (Syndication); Mathis Court with Judge Mathis (Syndication)
**Outstanding Instructional/How-To Program**: **Home Town Takeover (HGTV)**‡; Ask This Old House (PBS / The Roku Channel); Fixer Upper: Colorado Mountain House (Magnolia Network); The Last Wright: Building the Final Home Design of America's Greatest Architect (Magnolia Network); This Old House (PBS / The Roku Channel)	**Outstanding Travel and Adventure Program**: **Solo Traveling with Tracee Ellis Ross (The Roku Channel)**‡; Expedition Unknown (Discovery Channel); Long Way Home (Apple TV); The Lovely Lemurs of Madagascar (Syndication); Superskilled with Eva zu Beck (National Geographic Channel)
**Outstanding Arts and Popular Culture Program**: **Off Script With The Hollywood Reporter (IFC / AMC+)**‡; Beyond the Gates: Welcome to the Neighborhood (CBS); Variety & CNN Actors on Actors (CNN Digital); Variety Studio: Actors on Actors (PBS); Working in the Theatre (CUNY / American Theatre Wing)	**Outstanding Culinary Instructional Series**: **Be My Guest with Ina Garten (Food Network)**‡; Andrew Zimmern's Wild Game Kitchen (Outdoor Channel); Delicious Miss Brown (Food Network); Magnolia Table: At The Farm (Magnolia Network); Pati's Mexican Table (PBS)
**Outstanding Culinary Cultural Series**: **Lucky Chow (American Public Television / PBS)**‡; America the Bountiful (PBS); Best Ever Food Review Show (YouTube); Fork & Hammer (American Public Television / PBS); Savor the City (TV One)	**Outstanding Daytime Special**: **Unleashing Hope: The Power of Service Dogs for Children with Autism – Hilary Estey McLoughlin, Terence J. Noonan, and Rosie O'Donnell (Hulu)**‡; Critics Choice 2nd Annual Celebration of LBGTQ+ Cinema & Television – Joey Berlin, Paul Colichman, Stephen P Jarchow, and John Mongiardo (Here TV); Disney Parks Magical Christmas Day Parade – Michael Antinoro, Sally Hopkins Conner, Ashley Edens, Tiffany Faigus, Bill Fortney, and Alfonso Ribeiro (ABC); Living Proof – Norman Lee, Sheryl Lee Ralph, and Michiel Thomas (Hulu); Macy's Thanksgiving Day Parade – Will Coss, Liz Kelly, and Katy Mullan (NBC / Peacock)
**Outstanding Short Form Program**: **Glam Through the Ages – Keke Palmer, Sharon Palmer, and Max Wyeth (KeyTV Network)**‡; Catalyst – Courtney Coupe, Enrique Montalvo, David Pond, and Dan Roth (LinkedIn News); Most-Ordered – Stephen Pelletteri (Eater); The Path with Ryan Roslansky – Courtney Coupe, Florencia Iriondo, Enrique Montalvo, David Pond, Ryan Roslansky, and Dan Roth (LinkedIn News); Stand Up and Do Something with Michael Jr. – James Alexander, Andra Johnson Duke, Luke Johnson, Nancy Moore, Marty Patch, and Jeff Simpson (BYUtv)	**Outstanding Regional Content in a Daytime Genre**: **Requiem for Colour: A Journey through Lament and Joy (PBS)**‡; ROUTES: A Chef's Playground (Discover Oklahoma / YouTube); ROUTES: Tulsa Sound (Discover Oklahoma / YouTube)

=== Hosting & Daytime Personality – Non-Daily ===
Crafts
**Outstanding Culinary Show Host**: **Ina Garten – Be My Guest with Ina Garten (Food Network)**‡; Kardea Brown – Delicious Miss Brown (Food Network); Danielle Chang – Lucky Chow (PBS); Pati Jinich – Pati's Mexican Table (PBS); Andrew Zimmern – Andrew Zimmern's Wild Game Kitchen (Outdoor Channel)	**Outstanding Personality – Non Daily**: **Giada De Laurentiis – Giada in My Kitchen (Amazon Prime Video)**‡; Joy Behar, Alyssa Farah Griffin, Sara Haines, Sunny Hostin and Ana Navarro – The Weekend View (ABC News Live); Derrick Campana – The Wizard of Paws (BYUtv); Keke Palmer – Glam Through The Ages (KeyTV Network); Joseph Rosendo – Joseph Rosendo's Steppin' Out (American Public Television / PBS); Eva zu Beck – Superskilled with Eva zu Beck (National Geographic Channel)

=== Crafts ===
Crafts
**Outstanding Casting for a Daytime Program**: **General Hospital – Mark Teschner and Lisa Booth (ABC)**‡; Beyond the Gates (CBS); The Young and the Restless (CBS)	**Outstanding Main Title and Graphic Design for a Daytime Program**: **The Drew Barrymore Show (Syndication)**‡; The Kelly Clarkson Show (Syndication); Tamron Hall (Syndication)
**Outstanding Hairstyling and Makeup for a Daytime Program**: **Beyond the Gates – "Episode 103" – Wankaya Hinkson and Stevie Martin (CBS)**‡; **The Kelly Clarkson Show – "Episode 5033" – Earl Nicholson (Syndication)**‡; General Hospital – "Episode 15719" (ABC); The Young and the Restless – "Episode 13273" (CBS)	**Outstanding Costume Design/Styling for a Daytime Program**: **The Young and the Restless – "Episode 13273" – Mandi Line (CBS)**‡; The Jennifer Hudson Show – "Episode 4140" (Syndication); The Kelly Clarkson Show – "Episode 5033" (Syndication); Macy's Thanksgiving Day Parade (NBC / Peacock); The Young and the Restless – "Episode 13149" – Mandi Line (CBS)
**Outstanding Art Direction/Set Decoration/Scenic Design for a Daytime Program**: **The Kelly Clarkson Show – "Episode 5033" (Syndication)**‡; Live with Kelly and Mark – "Episode 250414" (Syndication); The View – "Episode 6280" (ABC); The Young and the Restless – "Episode 13145" (CBS); The Young and the Restless – "Episode 13244" (CBS)	**Outstanding Lighting Direction for a Daytime Program**: **Beyond the Gates – "Episode 104" – Victor Bland and Vincent Steib (CBS)**‡; General Hospital – "Episode 15624" – Robert Bessoir, Melanie Mohr, and George Webster (ABC); The Jennifer Hudson Show – "Episode 4010" – Sean Post, Kevin Cauley, and Brian Freidin (Syndication); The Kelly Clarkson Show – "Episode 6169" – Darren Langer and John Daniels (Syndication); Macy's Thanksgiving Day Parade – Geoff Amora, Trevor Brown, Michael Gottlieb, Rick Guiness, and Tim Stasse (NBC / Peacock)
**Outstanding Sound Mixing and Sound Editing for a Live Daytime Program**: **The Kelly Clarkson Show – "Episode 5007" – Robert Venable, Omatali Beckett, Rachel Orscher, James Slanger, Bob Lewis, Bryon Smith, Rebecca Malsburry, and Rosa Howell Thornhill (Syndication)**‡; The Bold and the Beautiful – "Episode 9658" J. Aaron Lepley, Tommy Persson, David Golba, Justin LaMont, and Brian Connell (CBS); The Jennifer Hudson Show – "Episode 4039" – Mike Stock, Josue Pena, Phil Gebhardt, Tig Moore, Liza Tan, Ron Thompson, Isaiah Reyes, Liz Cabral, and Carlos Torres (Syndication); Macy's Thanksgiving Day Parade – Greg Acker, Paul Adams, John Ariz, Jay Carrie, Mel Cubero, Frank Duca, Will Finan, Brian Flanzbaum, Josh Flower, Ricardo Gomez, Burton Ishmael, Ultan Molloy (NBC / Peacock); The Young and the Restless – "Episode 13260" – Andrzej Warzocha, Dean Johnson, Joseph Lawrence, Giovanni Meza, Godofredo Galvez, Gereald Rojo II, and Denise Palm Stones (CBS)	**Outstanding Live Sound Mixing and Sound Editing for a Prerecorded Program**: **Long Way Home – "Lost in Lapland" – Tristan Powell, Tim Boylan, Claire Ellis, Will Chapman and Patrick Fripp (Apple TV)** ‡; Bare Feet with Mickela Mallozzi – "Wild Atlantic Way North, Ireland"– Daniel Gaughra, and Jenna Escalera (PBS); Dream of Europe – "London Part 1 with Abbey Road Studios" – Jeff Ingram Watson, Jonathan Taft, and Chuck Barney Smith (PBS); Expedition Unknown – "The Man-Eating Lions of Kenya" – Ian Howard, David Miraglia, Mike Curtis, and Freddie DiPasquale (Discovery Channel); Forever Young with Dr. Pablo Prichard – "Wheel of Age" – David Barnett (NBC)
**Outstanding Editing for a Daytime Studio Program**: **Craft Roundtables – "Editors" – Trevor Wallace (PBS)**‡; The Drew Barrymore Show – "Episode 5137" – Angela Degatano, Rich Benkovic, Greg Boas, Cody Hall, Nadda Kanchanagom, Brian Kramer, Stacy Credidio, and Chris Molen (Syndication); Extra – "Extra at the Emmys" – Jennifer Fitzpatrick, Jay Avdul, Hassan El-Amin, Noah Harald, Christian Herb, Scott Madrigal, Kevin Wildermuth, and Tyler Wong (Syndication); The Kelly Clarkson Show – "Episode 5033" – Stas Lipovetskiy, Kliff Svatos, and Sam Goldfien (Syndication)	**Outstanding Editing for a Daytime Non-Studio Program**: **A Different Breed – "The Season Begins" – Bryn Vytlacil, Erik Becker, and Kara Ferrari (Amazon Prime Video)**‡; Expedition Unknown – "Great Pyramid Secrets Revealed" – Rob Claridge, William Kiss, Dustin Peterson, and Brian Sandidge (Discovery Channel); King of Collectibles: The Goldin Touch – "Ken-ichiwa!" – Jonathan Brown, Mac Caudill, Alexander Garcia, and Kenneth Toley (Netflix); Long Way Home – "Deep in the Forest" – Eliane Lazzaris (Apple TV); The Wizard of Paws – "Buster's New Kicks" – Taylor Servedio (BYUtv)
**Outstanding Cinematography or Camerawork for a Daytime Program**: **Long Way Home – "Lost in Lapland"** **– Max Cruz, Claudio von Planta, Anthony von Seck, and Luke Whatley-Bigg (Apple TV)** ‡; Disney Parks Magical Christmas Day Parade – James Costello, Pete Gill, Alonso Homs, Michelle McCabe, Jon Roche, Joe Sailer, Dylan Sanford, Rick Siegel, Josh Smith, Scott Acosta, Kristiona Arnds, George Bianchini, Ruben Carillo, William Christensen, Michael Cruickshank, Rob Curschman, Erik Curtis, Alex DiCicco, Chris Ferguson, Jonny Harkins, Shaun Harkins, Sarah Charlee Harrison, Travis Hays, Randy Huggins, Jay Kulick, Jeff Latonero, Adam Lighterman, Andrew Moore, Matt Roe, Aren Rosales, Keyan Safyari, Brian Sheid, Chad Smith, and Fed Wetherbee (ABC); France Made with Love – Thomas Jacobi, Patrick Greene, and Dylan Nathan (PBS); General Hospital – "Episode 15719" – Bruce Cooperman, Dean Cosanella, Gary Ellis Jr., Dave Forrest, and Victoria Walker (ABC); Superskilled with Eva zu Beck – "They Climb in Skirts… I Tried to Keep Up" – Josh Monie (National Geographic Channel); TrueSouth – "Ocean Springs, MS" – Jeremy Davis, Timothy Horgan, Thomas McCallum, Mathew Furuta, Santiago Garcia, and Matt Spear (ESPN / ABC / SEC Network)	**Outstanding Technical Direction, Camerawork, Video**: **Macy's Thanksgiving Day Parade – Dave Saretsky and Rene Butler (NBC / Peacock)**‡; Beyond the Gates – "Episode 104" – Santiago Garcia (CBS); The Bold and the Beautiful – "Episode 9511" – Gary Chamberlin (CBS); Disney Parks Magical Christmas Day Parade – James Coker (ABC); The Jennifer Hudson Show – "Episode 4041" – Scotty Anderson (Syndication)
**Outstanding Music Direction and Composition for a Daytime Program**: **Macy's Thanksgiving Day Parade – Ray Chew (NBC / Peacock)**‡; Beyond the Gates – "Episode 103" – Ashley Neumeister, Daeus Cannon, Kurt Farquhar, Zuberi Mackson, and Joshua Mosley (CBS); Have Guitar Will Travel World – "The Shetland Sound" – Kevin Doherty, Andrea Engleson, Mark Allen, and John Rodrigue (PBS); The Kelly Clarkson Show – "Episode 5033" – Jason Halbert (Syndication); Let Frankie Cook – "Getting the Band Back Together" – Luke Celenza (Tastemade)	**Outstanding Directing for a Daytime Studio Non-Fiction Series**: **The Kelly Clarkson Show – "Episode 5033" – Joe Terry (Syndication)**‡; Craft Roundtables – "Editors" – Mary Pelloni (PBS); The Drew Barrymore Show – "Episode 5127" – Scot Titelbaum (Syndication); Entertainment Tonight – "Episode 45.7" – Brian Campbell (Syndication); Today with Jenna & Friends – "Hoda-Bration" (NBC)
**Outstanding Directing for a Daytime Non-Studio Non-Fiction Series**: **A Different Breed – "The Season Begins" – Erik Becker and Aaron Bowden (Amazon Prime Video)**‡; Let Frankie Cook – "Pasta From Scratch" – Anne Fox (Tastemade); Samantha Brown's Places to Love – "Crystal Coast of North Carolina" – Sylvia Caminer (PBS); Superskilled with Eva zu Beck – "How I Survived a Trek Through the Desert Alone" – Eva zu Beck (National Geographic Channel); The Wizard of Paws – "Buster's New Kicks" – Hannah Altschwager (BYUtv)	**Outstanding Writing for a Daytime Non-Fiction Series**: **Expedition Unknown – "Searching for World War II's Lost Hero" – Ping Pong Productions (Discovery Channel)**‡; **This Old House – "Asheville Rebuilds" – Katie Buckley, Chris Ermides, and John Tomlin (PBS)**‡; Ask This Old House – "Thank You Roger Cook" – Sarah Chasse and Rebecca Galvin (PBS); Joseph Rosendo's Steppin' Out – "Cuba" – Joseph Rosendo (American Public Television / PBS); Lucky Chow – "Made in Taiwan" – Danielle Chang (American Public Television / PBS)
