= List of awards and nominations received by Keke Palmer =

Keke Palmer awards and nominations
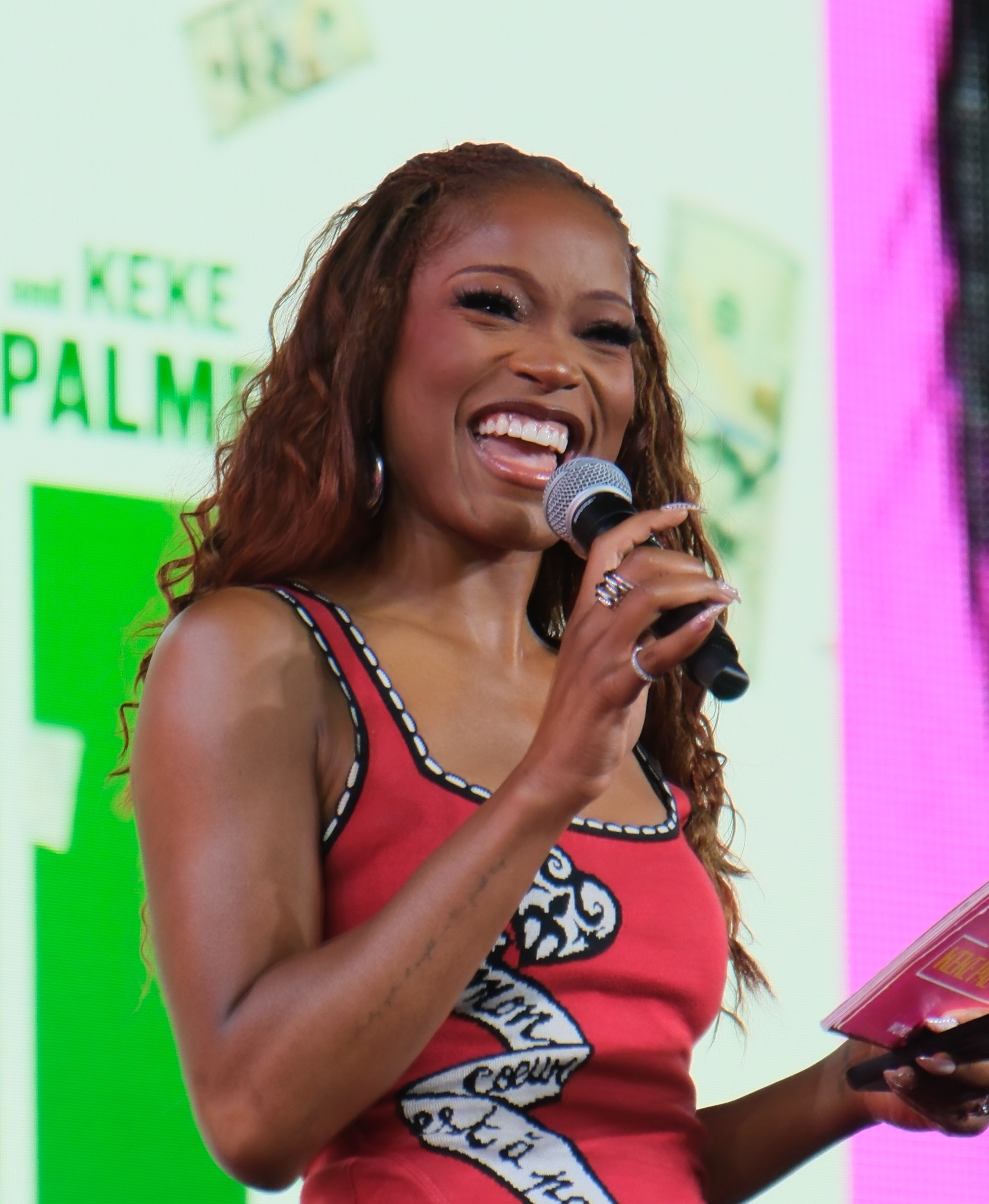
- Palmer at the 2025 Essence Festival of Culture
Awards and nominations
Award	Wins	Nominations
Actor Awards	0	1
BET Awards	2	9
Critics' Choice Awards	0	4
Emmy Awards (Daytime)	1	3
Emmy Awards (Primetime)	2	3
NAACP Image Awards	8	23

Totals (Note: Certain award groups do not simply award one winner. They acknowledge several different recipients, have runners-up, and have third place. Since this is a specific recognition and is different from losing an award, runner-up mentions are considered wins in this award tally. For simplification and to avoid errors, each award in this list has been presumed to have had a prior nomination.)
- Wins: 25
- Nominations: 94

Keke Palmer is an American actress, singer, and television personality, who has received various accolades throughout her career.

Active in the cinematographic field since the 2000s, she starred as Lou in the television film The Wool Cap (2004), receiving a nomination for the Actor Award for Outstanding Performance by a Female Actor in a Miniseries or Television Movie. In 2006, she starred in the lead role in the film Akeelah and the Bee, winning a Black Reel Award, an NAACP Image Award, and a Young Artist Award for Best Actress, while being nominated for the Critics' Choice Movie Award for Best Young Performer. Between 2008 and 2011, she portrayed True Jackson on the Nickelodeon teen sitcom True Jackson, VP, being recognized with four NAACP Image Awards for Outstanding Performance in a Youth/Children's Program.

In the 2010s, Palmer was a voice actor in the film and television series Ice Age as Peaches (2012–2016) and Winx Club as Aisha (2011–2015), and starred in several films, including Abducted: The Carlina White Story (2012), CrazySexyCool: The TLC Story (2013), and Brotherly Love (2015), receiving nominations for her performances at the Black Reel Awards and NAACP Image Awards. She hosted the ABC talk show Strahan, Sara & Keke (2019–2020), earning a Daytime Emmy Award nomination for Outstanding Entertainment Talk Show Host.

In 2021, Palmer portrayed all of the characters in the Facebook Watch series Turnt Up with the Taylors, for which she won the Primetime Emmy Award for Outstanding Actress in a Short Form Comedy or Drama Series. In 2022, she starred in the science-fiction horror film Nope, receiving nominations at the Saturn Awards and Critics' Choice Super Awards, while winning the New York Film Critics Circle Award and Toronto Film Critics Association Award for Best Supporting Actress. Since 2022, she has been hosting the game show Password, which won her a second Primetime Emmy Award.

== Major associations ==
=== Actor Awards ===
The Actor Awards are accolades bestowed by the members of the SAG-AFTRA, recognizing excellence in both individual and cast performances in movie and prime time television.

Year	Work	Category	Result	Ref.
2005	The Wool Cap	Outstanding Performance by a Female Actor in a Miniseries or Television Movie	Nominated	

=== Critics' Choice Awards ===
The Critics' Choice Awards are accolades presented by the Critics Choice Association to honor the finest in cinematic achievement.

Year	Work	Category	Result	Ref.
Movie Awards
2007	Akeelah and the Bee	Best Young Actress	Nominated	
Super Awards
2023	Nope	Best Actress in a Science Fiction/Fantasy Movie	Nominated	
2026	I Love Boosters	Best Actress in a Science Fiction/Fantasy Movie	Nominated	
Real TV Awards
2024	Password	Best Show Host	Nominated	

=== Emmy Awards ===
The Emmy Awards are an extensive range of awards for artistic and technical merit for the American and international television industry.

Year	Work	Category	Result	Ref.
Daytime Emmy Awards
2020	Strahan, Sara & Keke	Outstanding Entertainment Talk Show Host	Nominated	
2026	Glam Through the Ages	Outstanding Daytime Short Form Program (as a producer)	Won	
2026	Glam Through the Ages	Outstanding Daytime Personality – Non-Daily	Nominated	
Primetime Emmy Awards
2022	Keke Palmer's Turnt Up with the Taylors	Outstanding Actress in a Short Form Comedy or Drama Series	Won	
2023	Password	Outstanding Host for a Game Show	Won	
2024	Password	Outstanding Host for a Game Show	Nominated	

== Miscellaneous awards ==
Award	Year (Note: Indicates the year of ceremony.)	Nominated work	Category	Result	Ref.
BET Awards	2010	—	YoungStar Award	Won	
BET Awards	2011	—	YoungStar Award	Nominated	
BET Awards	2012	—	YoungStar Award	Nominated	
BET Awards	2013	—	YoungStar Award	Nominated	
BET Awards	2014	—	YoungStar Award	Won	
BET Awards	2023	—	Best Actress	Nominated	
BET Awards	2025	—	Best Actress	Nominated	
BET Awards	2026	—	Best Actress	Nominated	
BET Awards	2026	Baby, This Is Keke Palmer	Pulse Award	Nominated	
Black Reel Awards	2007	Akeelah and the Bee	Outstanding Actress	Won	
Black Reel Awards	2007	Akeelah and the Bee	Outstanding Breakthrough Performance	Nominated	
Black Reel Awards	2008	The Longshots	Outstanding Actress	Nominated	
Black Reel Awards	2013	Abducted: The Carlina White Story	Outstanding Actress in a TV Movie or Limited Series	Nominated	
Black Reel Awards	2014	CrazySexyCool: The TLC Story	Outstanding Actress in a TV Movie or Limited Series	Nominated	
Black Reel Awards	2023	Nope	Outstanding Supporting Actress	Nominated	
Black Reel Awards	2023	Lightyear	Outstanding Voice Performance	Nominated	
Black Reel Awards	2026	One of Them Days	Outstanding Lead Performance	Nominated	
Black Reel TV Awards	2026	The 'Burbs	Outstanding Lead Performance in a Comedy Series	Nominated	
Dorian Awards	2023	Nope	Supporting Film Performance of the Year	Nominated	
Dorian Awards	2023	—	Wilde Artist Award	Nominated	
EDA Awards	2023	Lightyear	Best Animated Female	Nominated	
Fangoria Chainsaw Awards	2023	Nope	Best Lead Performance	Nominated	
Film Independent Spirit Awards	2026	One of Them Days	Best Lead Performance	Nominated	
GLAAD Media Awards	2025	Baby, This Is Keke Palmer	Outstanding Podcast	Won	
MTV Movie & TV Awards	2023	Nope	Best Performance in a Movie	Nominated	
MTV Movie & TV Awards	2023	Nope	Best Comedic Performance	Nominated	
NAACP Image Awards	2005	The Wool Cap	Outstanding Actress in a Television Movie, Mini-Series or Dramatic Special	Nominated	
NAACP Image Awards	2007	Akeelah and the Bee	Outstanding Actress in a Motion Picture	Won	
NAACP Image Awards	2009	True Jackson, VP	Outstanding Performance in a Youth/Children's Program (Series or Special)	Won	
NAACP Image Awards	2010	True Jackson, VP	Outstanding Performance in a Youth/Children's Program (Series or Special)	Won	
NAACP Image Awards	2011	True Jackson, VP	Outstanding Performance in a Youth/Children's Program (Series or Special)	Won	
NAACP Image Awards	2012	True Jackson, VP	Outstanding Performance in a Youth/Children's Program (Series or Special)	Won	
NAACP Image Awards	2013	Winx Club	Outstanding Performance in a Youth/Children's Program (Series or Special)	Nominated	
NAACP Image Awards	2013	Abducted: The Carlina White Story	Outstanding Actress in a Television Movie, Mini-Series or Dramatic Special	Nominated	
NAACP Image Awards	2014	CrazySexyCool: The TLC Story	Outstanding Actress in a Television Movie, Mini-Series or Dramatic Special	Nominated	
NAACP Image Awards	2015	The Trip to Bountiful	Outstanding Actress in a Television Movie, Mini-Series or Dramatic Special	Nominated	
NAACP Image Awards	2016	Brotherly Love	Outstanding Actress in a Motion Picture	Nominated	
NAACP Image Awards	2022	Big Mouth	Outstanding Character Voice-Over Performance (Television)	Nominated	
NAACP Image Awards	2023	Alice	Outstanding Actress in a Motion Picture	Nominated	
NAACP Image Awards	2023	Lightyear	Outstanding Character Voice-Over Performance (Motion Picture)	Won	
NAACP Image Awards	2023	Password	Outstanding Host in a Reality/Reality Competition, Game Show or Variety (Series or Special) – Individual or Ensemble	Nominated	
NAACP Image Awards	2024	—	Entertainer of the Year	Nominated	
NAACP Image Awards	2024	Big Boss	Outstanding Directing in a Television Movie or Special	Nominated	
NAACP Image Awards	2024	The Proud Family: Louder and Prouder	Outstanding Character Voice-Over Performance (Television)	Nominated	
NAACP Image Awards	2024	Baby, This Is Keke Palmer	Outstanding Arts and Entertainment Podcast	Nominated	
NAACP Image Awards	2025	—	Entertainer of the Year	Won	
NAACP Image Awards	2025	Password	Outstanding Host in a Reality/Reality Competition, Game Show or Variety (Series or Special) – Individual or Ensemble	Won	
NAACP Image Awards	2025	The Second Best Hospital in the Galaxy	Outstanding Character Voice-Over Performance (Television)	Nominated	
NAACP Image Awards	2025	Baby, This Is Keke Palmer	Outstanding Society and Culture Podcast	Nominated	
NAACP Image Awards	2026	One of Them Days	Outstanding Actress in a Motion Picture	Nominated	
NAACP Image Awards	2026	One of Them Days	Outstanding Ensemble Cast in a Motion Picture	Nominated	
NAACP Image Awards	2026	Baby, This is Keke Palmer	Outstanding Society and Culture Podcast	Nominated	
Newport International Film Festival Awards	2022	—	Artist of Distinction Award	Won	
Nickelodeon Kids' Choice Awards	2010	True Jackson, VP	Favorite TV Actress	Nominated	
Nickelodeon Kids' Choice Awards	2023	Lightyear	Favorite Voice from an Animated Movie (Female)	Nominated	
Nickelodeon Kids' Choice Awards	2025	Baby, This Is Keke Palmer	Favorite Podcast	Nominated	
People's Choice Awards	2022	Nope	The Female Movie Star of 2022	Nominated	
People's Choice Awards	2022	Nope	The Drama Movie Star of 2022	Nominated	
People's Choice Awards	2024	That's My Jam	The Competition Contestant of the Year	Nominated	
Rhode Island International Film Festival Awards	2023	Big Boss	Best Music Video	Won	
Saturn Awards	2022	Nope	Best Actress in a Film	Nominated	
Shorty Awards	2020	—	Best Celebrity	Nominated	
ShoWest Convention Awards	2006	—	Rising Star of the Year	Won	
Vienna Independent Film Festival Awards	2022	Big Boss	Best Music Film	Won	
Webby Awards	2024	Baby, This Is Keke Palmer	Best Host, Features (Podcasts)	Won	
Webby Awards	2024	Baby, This Is Keke Palmer	Webby Special Achievement Award	Won	
Webby Awards	2025	Baby, This Is Keke Palmer	Best Host, Features (Podcasts)	Nominated	
Webby Awards	2025	Baby, This Is Keke Palmer	Best Interview/Talk Show (Podcasts)	Won	
Webby Awards	2026	Baby, This Is Keke Palmer	Best Host, Features (Podcasts)	Nominated	
Webby Awards	2026	Baby, This Is Keke Palmer	Best Interview/Talk Show – Entertainment & Culture (Podcasts)	Nominated	
Young Artist Awards	2005	The Wool Cap	Best Leading Young Actress in a TV Movie, Miniseries or Special	Nominated	
Young Artist Awards	2007	Akeelah and the Bee	Best Leading Young Actress in a Feature Film	Won	
Young Artist Awards	2008	Cleaner	Best Supporting Young Actress in a Feature Film	Nominated	
Young Artist Awards	2009	The Longshots	Best Leading Young Actress in a Feature Film	Nominated	
Young Artist Awards	2011	True Jackson, VP	Best Leading Young Actress in a TV Series (Comedy or Drama)	Nominated	

== Critics associations ==
Organization	Year	Nominated work	Category	Result	Ref.
Austin Film Critics Association	2023	Nope	Best Supporting Actress	Nominated	
Chicago Film Critics Association	2006	Akeelah and the Bee	Most Promising Performer	Nominated	
Georgia Film Critics Association	2023	Nope	Best Supporting Actress	Nominated	
Hollywood Creative Alliance (Midseason Awards)	2026	I Love Boosters	Best Actress	Nominated	
Hollywood Creative Alliance (TV Awards)	2026	The 'Burbs	Best Actress in a Comedy Series	Nominated	
Hollywood Critics Association	2023	Nope	Best Supporting Actress	Nominated	
New York Film Critics Circle	2022	Nope	Best Supporting Actress	Won	
Seattle Film Critics Society	2023	Nope	Best Actress in a Supporting Role	Nominated	
Toronto Film Critics Association	2023	Nope	Best Supporting Actress	Won	
