= Rags (2012 film) =

2012 Bille Woodruff film

- Film poster
- Genre: Musical film
- Based on: Cinderella by Giambattista Basile
- Written by: Jason Fuchs; Elizabeth Hackett; Hilary Galanoy
- Directed by: Bille Woodruff
- Starring: Keke Palmer; Max Schneider; Drake Bell; Avan Jogia; Burkely Duffield; Keenan Tracey
- Theme music composer: Rodney Jerkins; Andre Lindal; Travis Sayles
- Countries of origin: United States; Canada
- Original language: English

Production
- Producers: Nick Cannon; Lauren Levine; Keke Palmer; Scott McAboy
- Cinematography: Glen Winter
- Editor: Michael Jablow
- Running time: 88 minutes
- Production company: Pacific Bay Entertainment Canada

Original release
- Network: Nickelodeon
- Release: May 28, 2012

Rags is a Nickelodeon Original Movie. It is a musical, gender-switched inversion and modernization of the Cinderella fairy tale, starring Keke Palmer, Max Schneider, Drake Bell, Avan Jogia, and Nick Cannon. The film premiered on Nickelodeon on May 28, 2012.

The film was released on DVD on August 28, 2012, as a double feature with Big Time Movie.

== Plot ==
In New York City, Charlie Prince is an orphaned teenager living in his late mother's old karaoke bar, The Palace, willed to his acerbic and unloving stepfather, Arthur. Arthur makes Charlie do most of the work cleaning the bar; the other employees, couple Diego and Martha, love Charlie like their own son, while his stepbrothers, the selfish Andrew and the nicer but simple-minded Lloyd, only annoy him. All three boys dream of being singers, and while Andrew in particular lacks talent (which Arthur is blind to), Charlie is vocally talented and can write music, though he can't catch a break. Lloyd is also mistreated by his father and brother, and secretly sympathizes with Charlie, but is too fearful to stand up to his family.

On the other hand, pop star Kadee Worth is the daughter of music mogul Reginald Worth, president of Majesty Records. While the world knows her as a glamorous superstar, she is secretly frustrated with singing other people's songs and wearing clothes others choose for her. Her self-centered "boyfriend," Finn, whom she is only dating for the cameras, adds to her annoyance because her father believes it will help her sell records. Meanwhile, all Kadee wants is for the world to hear and see her true talent.

One day, Arthur sends Charlie to deliver his stepbrothers' track "Androyd" to Majesty Records for their newly announced talent contest, and on the way, he bumps into Kadee after her dog, Trumpet, runs towards him. He drops off the disk and then notices a job offer as a janitor. Shawn, an employee of Majesty Records, sees him and tells the receptionist to ensure Charlie gets the job. Shortly after he's hired, Shawn catches Charlie singing in the studio and helps him record a demo. Charlie bumps into Kadee throughout his employment, slowly making enough of an impression on her that she starts following him. Meanwhile, Arthur receives notice of Androyd's rejection from the talent contest.

Kadee finally talks to Charlie outside of work and reveals that she writes her own music, and he takes Kadee into town and encourages her to sing. Wearing a thin but effective disguise, she performs one of her songs on the street and loves the experience. As thanks, she gives Charlie an invitation to Majesty Records' Masquerade Ball, where the company will announce the talent contest winner. Still, Arthur confiscates the invitation and uses it to take Androyd to the ball. With Diego and Martha's help, Charlie sneaks into the ball.

After dancing with Kadee in disguise, Charlie meets Shawn, the party DJ, who gives him a demo CD with the stage name "Rags" as a reminder of his humble origins. When the talent contest winner fails to appear at the ball as the planned musical act, Arthur seizes the opportunity to send Androyd up, but the crowd quickly boos them off. Shawn encourages Charlie to perform instead, and though hesitant, he agrees and steals the show but hurries out immediately after as he sees his stepfamily departing. On the way out, he kisses Kadee, telling her again to "Be you," and accidentally drops his CD.

Kadee, desperate to discover who Rags is, asks her father to help her find him, but he doesn't listen, thinking it wouldn't be a good business move. Unwilling to give up, Kadee tracks down Charlie at The Palace and asks him to help. Working up all of his nerves, Charlie attempts to confess his identity, but Kadee doesn't hear him, leading him to help with the search auditions; nobody else had listened to the second song on the CD, so whoever knew the lyrics was Rags. When Reginald confronts Kadee, she berates him for not listening to her and focusing only on her career. Charlie inadvertently eavesdrops and walks away with the mistaken impression that Kadee has no interest in him, only for Kadee to compliment him immediately after and end her relationship with Finn. Lloyd, who recognizes Charlie's performance from the design of his shoes, encourages him to go after Kadee and promises to keep his secret.

Andrew overhears the conversation, goes through Charlie's room, and steals his songbook, presenting it to Arthur. At the auditions, Reginald arrives and apologizes for ignoring Kadee, promising to be more receptive. Charlie also encourages Kadee, telling her again, "Be you," to her surprise. Andrew shows up to audition and leads Charlie to his father, who locks him in a closet so that Andrew can pose as Rags, leaving Lloyd as just a backup singer. Arthur also reveals he intends to sell The Palace. Though Charlie escapes with the help of Trumpet and Kadee's girlfriends, he arrives just in time to see Andrew shake hands with Reginald Worth.

Heartbroken, Charlie packs his things and plans to leave, but Kadee finds him and pleads with him to stay until she introduces Rags. To everyone's surprise, she calls up Charlie, having put together the pieces from him telling her to be herself. Ecstatic, Charlie begins to sing for the crowd but soon invites Kadee up to the stage and tells her to sing her songs, which she does with her father's encouragement. Upon hearing his daughter's true talent, Reginald is astounded and puts Kadee in charge of her career from that point on. Lloyd, fed up with his father and brother’s mistreatment, reveals that Charlie's mom left The Palace to Charlie, not Arthur, which adds to Charlie's day.

Charlie and Kadee start dating and appear on many magazine covers. The movie ends with them singing "Me And You Against The World" at The Palace, now owned by Charlie and still managed by Diego and Martha. Lloyd is a backup dancer, while Arthur and Andrew are made janitors as punishment for their actions towards Charlie.

== Cast ==
- Keke Palmer as Kadee Worth, a famous pop singer who befriends Charlie. She helps him with his dreams, and he helps her see what she really wants.
- Max Schneider as Charlie Prince, a talented, young musician with the hopes of being famous.
- Drake Bell as Shawn, a studio technician at Majesty Records who helps Charlie produce his demo CD that leads Kadee to Rags.
- Avan Jogia as Finn, Kadee's rockstar ex-boyfriend.
- Zak Santiago as Diego, a worker with Martha at Arthur's store and Charlie's father figure.
- Christina Sicoli as Martha, a worker with Diego at Arthur's store and Charlie's mother figure.
- Robert Moloney as Arthur McGowens, Charlie's horrible stepfather.
- Burkely Duffield as Lloyd McGowens, Charlie's nicer stepbrother. He develops a crush on Kadee’s friend, Tammy, at Kadee’s masquerade party.
- Keenan Tracey as Andrew McGowens, Charlie's spoiled and selfish stepbrother.
- Isaiah Mustafa as Reginald Worth, Kadee's father.
- Nick Cannon as Himself
- Devon Weigel as Irma, Reginald Worth's assistant.
- Tracy Spiridakos as Sammi, Kadee's friend.
- Carlena Britch as Tammy, Kadee's friend and backup dancer. She develops a crush on Charlie’s stepbrother, Lloyd, at Kadee’s masquerade party.
- Maggie Ma as the Majesty Records receptionist.

== Production ==
=== Filming ===
Filming took place in Vancouver, British Columbia, Canada from May to June 2011. The film premiered on Nickelodeon in the United States on Monday, May 28, 2012.

== Reception ==
=== Ratings ===
The film received 3.5 million viewers, however it earned 4.6 million total viewers (Live + 7 day), becoming one of Nickelodeon's highest rated original films. The film shot to the top of the iTunes sales charts, debuting as the #1 musical on iTunes and remaining atop the charts for more than a month.

The film had 139,000 viewers on Nickelodeon in the United Kingdom and Ireland.

=== Critical response ===
Emily Ashby of Common Sense Media gave the film a rate of three stars out of five, saying a "sweet modern fairy tale shows off singing talents of stars."

== Home media ==
The film was released on DVD on August 28, 2012, together with Big Time Movie.

== Soundtrack ==
Rags (Music from the Original Movie)

Soundtrack album by Keke Palmer and Max Schneider
- Released: May 22, 2012
- Recorded: 2011
- Genres: R&B; pop
- Length: 38:32
- Label: Nickelodeon
- Producers: Darkchild; Andre Lindal

Keke Palmer chronology
Awaken Reloaded (2011)	Rags (Music from the Original Movie) (2012)	Keke Palmer (2012)

Max Schneider chronology
First Encounters (2010)	Rags (Music from the Original Movie) (2012)	The Say Max EP (2014)

Rags (Music from the Original Movie) is a soundtrack album by the film of the same name, released on May 22, 2012, by Nickelodeon Records. All the songs were produced by Darkchild and Andre Lindal. It includes nine songs featured by Keke Palmer and Max Schneider, with three bonus tracks. It was released on May 22, 2012. The soundtrack peaked at number one on the iTunes soundtrack albums chart and number three on the Top 100 albums on iTunes chart. "Me and You Against the World" was released as a promotional single on April 17, 2012.

=== Track listing ===
No.	Title	Writer(s)	Performed by	Length
1.	"Me and You Against the World"	Michaela Shiloh; Rodney Jerkins; Thomas Lumpkins	Keke Palmer and Max Schneider	3:29
2.	"Someday" (film version)	Andre Lindal; LaShawn Daniels; Jerkins; Lumpkins	Max Schneider	3:47
3.	"Love You Hate You"	John Conte; Shiloh; Jerkins; Raelene Arreguin	Keke Palmer	3:18
4.	"Nothing Gets Better Than This"	Lindal; Conte; Arreguin; Jerkins; Lumpkins; Travis Sayles	Max Schneider	2:34
5.	"Stand Out" (film version)	Conte; Arreguin; Jerkins; Lumpkins; Sayles	featuring Keke Palmer	3:18
6.	"Hands Up"	Lindal; Daniels; Jerkins; Lumpkins	Max Schneider	2:58
7.	"Perfect Harmony"	Lindal; Daniels; Shiloh; Jerkins; Lumpkins	Keke Palmer and Max Schneider	2:26
8.	"Look at Me Now"	Lindal; Shiloh; Jerkins; Lumpkins	Keke Palmer	3:21
9.	"Not So Different at All"	Conte; Shiloh; Arreguin; Jerkins; Lumpkins; Sayles	Max Schneider	3:25
10.	"Stand Out" (album version)	Conte; Arreguin; Jerkins; Lumpkins; Sayles	Keke Palmer	3:07
11.	"Things Aren't Always What They Seem"	Lindal; Priscilla Hamilton; Jerkins	Keke Palmer and Max Schneider	3:31
12.	"Someday" (album version)	Lindal; Daniels; Jerkins; Lumpkins	Max Schneider	3:47
Total length:				38:59

=== Charts ===
Chart performance for Rags
Chart (2012)	Peak position
US Billboard 200	56
US Kid Albums (Billboard)	1
US Soundtrack Albums (Billboard)	3
