= KeyTV Network =

Digital media network

- Country: United States
- Broadcast area: International (select areas)

Programming
- Language: English
- Picture format: 1080i (HDTV); 480i (SDTV)

History
- Launched: 2021
- Founder: Keke Palmer; Lenoria Addison

Links
- Website: keytvnetwork.com

KeyTV Network is a digital media network founded by actress, singer, and television host Keke Palmer in 2021. KeyTV Network provides opportunities for creators within acting, music, writing, and production. Programming and Content from KeyTV Network is distributed primarily through YouTube, Instagram, TikTok, Facebook, and its official website, emphasizing storytelling and creative innovation.

== Background and Development ==
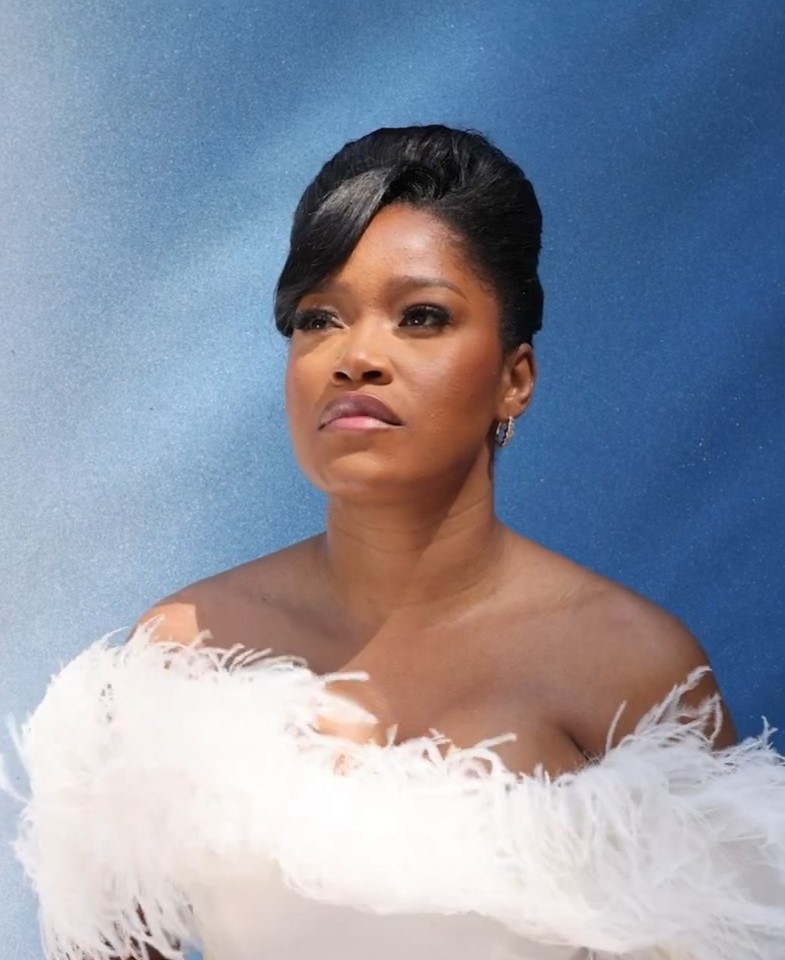
Palmer in 2023

Actress and singer Keke Palmer founded KeyTV Network Network, with a $500,000.00 investment with Entertainment One (eOne) in March 2021 as a digital platform highlighting underrepresented voices and creators in the entertainment industry.

Inspired by Issa Rae and Queen Latifah, who have been influential in breaking barriers and creating platforms for diverse individuals. The concept of KeyTV Network stemmed from Palmer’s personal experiences within the industry and her desire to introduce new talent to Hollywood and provide opportunities to people of color who have faced hardships entering the entertainment industry.

"We really wanted to give people a chance that would very rarely have a chance," - Palmer.

KeyTV Network premiered in November 2022 and gained 762,000 subscribers within the first three months.

== Content ==
KeyTV Network’s mission is to educate and empower creators by providing a platform that shines a light on diverse narratives and storytelling. The network strongly emphasizes representation, desiring to magnify marginalized voices.

KeyTV Network explores cultural storytelling, community, identity, and comedy themes, including various formats and genres aimed at a broad audience.

== Programming ==
KeyTV Network features programming covering multiple genres, including scripted series, talk shows and documentaries.

Original programs includes titles such as Heaux & Tell, Make It Make Sense, Dear Keke, and Unlabeled, along with programming based on subjects such as relationships, personal growth, and societal issues.

The following program descriptions are based on information from an official KeyTV Network press interview.

=== Comedy/Dramedy ===
- Cuzzin M: A puppet-led sketch comedy series
- Heaux & Tell: A dramedy following three young women in Atlanta as they navigate love, sexuality, and personal growth.
- Sportsfan: A family sitcom shot entirely on iPhones, centering on CJ, a dedicated sports fan, balancing family and fandom.
- DivaGurl: A comedy showing the trials and tribulations of an aspiring girl group.
- Southern Fried Rice: a dramedy following the life of a Korean-American girl, raised from birth by African-American parents from the South, who struggles to defend and redefine her identity after being enrolling into a popular HBCU.

=== Music and Culture ===
- Unlabeled: A docuseries focusing on the life of independent artists who thrive without a record label.
- Make it Make Sense: An unscripted talk series where the animated host discusses current events in pop culture.
- Big Girl Blues: A docuseries focusing on the trials and tribulations of plus-sized women and their evolution involving self-acceptance.

=== Social Commentary & Talk ===
- Cyber Chat: A talk show where the host discusses trending topics, digital culture, and societal issues.
- The Psychological Evolution of F*ckboys: A series exploring the behaviors and mindsets of dating, examining the evolution of the ‘F*ckboy’ archetype.
- Connected: A docuseries exploring the lives of two young Latina Women on a quest for self-discovery.
- Nepotista: A docuseries examining the dynamics of nepotism within the entertainment industry.

=== Drama and Thriller ===
- Blu Forest: A short film about a group of friends who reside at a haunted cabin.
- Live or Die: A podcast format drama discussing moral dilemmas and controversial topics.

=== Fiction Film ===
- Keymakers: A behind-the-scenes look at KeyTV Network, highlighting the creators who shape the network’s vision.
- Bosses: A reality show, starring Keke Palmers mother, Sharon Palmer, who launches her own talent Management Company.

== Reception and Impact ==
KeyTV Network has received positive reviews from critics, with many praising its focus on transparent storytelling and commitment to telling authentic stories.

KeyTV Network has reached 1.03 million subscribers on YouTube and 8.4 million followers on Facebook.

As of April 2025, there have been no documented awards or nominations.

In 2026, the channel's program Glam Through the Ages won an award for Outstanding Short Form Program at the 53rd Daytime Creative Arts & Lifestyle Emmy Awards.

== Distribution ==
KeyTV Network is primarily distributed through digital channels, such as YouTube and Facebook, allowing the network to reach its desired audience directly and in a more accessible way.
