= Southern Fried Rice =

Web series by Nakia Stephens & Keke Palmer

- Also known as: Southern Fried Rice
- Genre: comedy drama
- Created by: Nakia Stephens
- Directed by: Shayla Racquel
- Starring: Page Yang; Andreya Wallang; Erika Norrell; Marlena Robinson
- Country of origin: United States
- Original language: English
- No. of seasons: 1
- No. of episodes: 7

Production
- Executive producers: Keke Palmer; Sharon Palmer; Lenoria Addison; Nakia Stephens
- Producer: Keke Palmer
- Production company: KeyTV Network

Original release
- Network: YouTube; Facebook
- Release: October 22 – October 24, 2025

Southern Fried Rice is an American comedy drama web series created by Nakia Stephens, directed by Shayla Racquel, produced by Keke Palmer, and starring Page Yang. It premiered on the KeyTV Network dedicated YouTube channel on October 22, 2025. The show follows the life of a Korean-American girl, raised from birth by African-American parents from the South, who struggles to defend and redefine her identity after being enrolled into a popular HBCU.

Critics have condemned Southern Fried Rice for appropriation of African American culture and unrealistic portrayals of the HBCU experience.

== History ==
Keke Palmer dropped the trailer for the series on October 21, 2025.

In 2023, Palmer spoke to Revolt about her vision for KeyTV Network, which is being intentional about working with Black creators. She explained, “I want to continue to submit amazing content. I want to see the people who work with me gain more opportunities...our community has a lot to offer, and people don’t know or credit us for what we’re offering.” As a result of some of the social media outrage, creator, Stephens took to X to explain that based on her own HBCU experiences, and the cast being made up of HBCU alumni, she was inspired to create the series through many various iterations over 10 years. She explained, “My ultimate goal was to spark conversation around culture, around belonging and around identity. And so, that’s what I think I’ve done."

== Characters and cast ==
- Koko, portrayed by Page Yang
- Joy, portrayed by Andreya Wallang
- Treasure, portrayed by Erika Norrell
- Tami, portrayed by Marlena Robinson
- Dottie Jackson, portrayed by Myra Brown
- Justin, portrayed by Dasani Horton
- Milan, portrayed by Shaun Rose
- Marie, portrayed by Jada Lewis
- Alex, portrayed by Choyce Brown
- Cooli, portrayed by Sencere Brown
- Steve, portrayed by Kordell Beckham
- Yasir, portrayed by DaShawn Simon
- Dr. McBean, portrayed by Quinten Johnson
- Ms. Kilgore, portrayed by Celeste Campbell
- L'Trell, portrayed by Wangechi Warui
- Dr. Ryder, portrayed by Marita A. McKee
- Erika, portrayed by Shuntel Renay
- Jackie, portrayed by Jhaneal Kelli Hector
- Derrick, portrayed by Jai'Reeh Demond
- Honestee, portrayed by Ashley India

== Episodes ==
Season	Episodes	Originally released	
Season	Episodes	First released	Last released
1	7	October 22, 2025	October 24, 2025

=== Season 1 (2025) ===
No. overall	No. in season	Title	Directed by	Written by	Original release date
1	1	"Elephant in The Room"	Shayla Racquel	Nakia Stephens	October 22, 2025
2	2	"A Tribe Called Mess"	Shayla Racquel	Nakia Stephens	October 22, 2025
3	3	"Freshman Year Experience"	Shayla Racquel	Nakia Stephens	October 24, 2025
4	4	"Women of Excellence"	Shayla Racquel	Nakia Stephens	October 24, 2025
5	5	"First Draft Pick"	Shayla Racquel	Nakia Stephens	October 24, 2025
6	6	"My Sister's Keeper"	Shayla Racquel	Nakia Stephens	October 24, 2025
7	7	"Fright Night"	Shayla Racquel	Nakia Stephens	October 24, 2025

== Reception ==
Critics have condemned Southern Fried Rice for cultural appropriation of African American culture, unrealistic or unnecessary portrayal of the HBCU experience, Complex describes comments about the show such as “I cannot begin to express how tone deaf this series is considering the current political climate. Really, Keke?”
