= So Uncool =

Studio album by Keke Palmer
- Released: September 18, 2007
- Recorded: 2006–2007
- Genre: R&B
- Length: 42:47
- Label: Atlantic
- Producer: Jonathan "J.R." Rotem; Toby Gad; Anthony Dent; Fingazz; Focus...; Isaac Hayes III; Rodney Jerkins; D'Mile; Babygirl

Keke Palmer chronology
Keke Palmer (2007)	So Uncool (2007)	Awaken (2011)

Singles from So Uncool
- 1. "Footwurkin'" Released: July 4, 2007; 2. "Keep It Movin'" Released: August 7, 2007

Professional ratings
Review scores
Source	Rating
AllMusic	4/5 stars

So Uncool is the debut studio album by American singer and actress Keke Palmer. The album was released on September 18, 2007, by Atlantic Records.

Even though it received a positive review, the album did not perform well on the Billboard charts. In 2009, Palmer moved from Atlantic to Interscope Records.

== Singles ==
The lead single "Footworkin'" was released on July 4, 2007. A concert tour was created to promote the single.

"Keep It Movin'" was released on July 17, 2007, as the second single. It features rapper Big Meech, who was also signed to Atlantic. It was sent to US mainstream radio on August 7, 2007, after being released in Europe on July 17.

=== Promotional singles ===
"Skin Deep" was released as the only promotional single on July 17, 2007, along with "Keep It Movin'".

== Track listing ==
No.	Title	Writer(s)	Producer(s)	Length
1	"Keep It Movin'" featuring Big Meech	John Stary; Dametrice Cilek; Jeffrey Allen; Mischke Butler; Keke Palmer	Fingazz	3:48
2	"The Game Song"	Bernard "Focus..." Edwards Jr.; Ezekiel Lewis; Patrick "J Que" Smith; Balewa Muhammad; Candice Nelson; Keri Hilson	Focus...	3:16
3	"Music Box"	Edwards Jr.; Muhammad; Lewis; Nelson; Smith	Focus...	3:29
4	"First Crush"	Butler; Isaac Hayes III	Isaac "Ike Dirty" Hayes III	3:52
5	"Friend Me Up"	Rodney Jerkins; Dernst Emile ll; Atozzio Towns; Palmer	Rodney Jerkins; D'Mile	3:17
6	"How Will I Know"	Lashaunda "Babygirl" Carr; Ebony Love; Robert Stafford; Asia Vernimo; Takuji Kura; Barry Adams; Mia Braswell	Babygirl	3:44
7	"Footwurkin'"	Jonathan Rotem; Evan Kidd Bogart; Lyrica Anderson; Erin "Niré Alldai" Reed; Herbie Hancock	J.R. Rotem	3:04
8	"Rainbow"	Palmer; Loreal Palmer; Tobias Gad	Toby Gad	3:59
9	"Bottoms Up"	Palmer; L. Palmer; Gad	Toby Gad	3:41
10	"Skin Deep"	Palmer; L. Palmer; Gad	Toby Gad	3:40
11	"Wake Up Call"	Palmer; L. Palmer; Gad	Toby Gad	3:12
12	"Hood Anthem"	Crystal Nicole; Anthony Dent; Stone Stafford	Anthony Dent	3:38

== Charts ==
=== Weekly charts ===
Chart performance for So Uncool
Chart (2007)	Peak position
US Heatseekers Albums (Billboard)	26
US Top R&B/Hip-Hop Albums (Billboard)	86
