= Awaken (mixtape) =

Mixtape by Keke Palmer
- Released: March 18, 2011
- Recorded: 2006–2010
- Length: 40:01
- Label: Independent

Keke Palmer chronology
So Uncool (2007)	Awaken (2011)	Awaken Reloaded (2011)

Singles from Awaken
- 1. "The One You Call" Released: December 7, 2010

Awaken is the debut mixtape by American singer-songwriter Keke Palmer. It was officially released on March 18, 2011 for downloads on mixtape-downloading websites. The only single "The One You Call" was released digitally on December 7, 2010, and was sent to Urban radio on January 8, 2011. A music video was also released for the song. It premiered on Palmer's official YouTube channel and iTunes.

== Background ==
Palmer released Awaken as a teaser of her upcoming new music, expected to be released in 2012. Palmer hoped that the mixtape would boost interest in her upcoming music. Three tracks from the mixtape appeared on her debut album, So Uncool: "The Game Song", "Bottoms Up" and "Keep it Movin'", each was released in 2007.

== Promotion ==
Palmer sang her song "Top of the World" at the 2009 Macy's Thanksgiving Day Parade on the Build-a-Bear Workshop float. Many of the songs were also leaked by Palmer on her official YouTube channel before the release of the mixtape.

== Critical reception ==
The reviews for Awaken are mostly positive, many complimenting Palmer's vocals, but questioning its ability to chart.

Peggy Oliver from The Urban Music Scene said "Palmer’s crystal voice is pleasing and soulful. As for the music on the Awaken Mixtape, the production is clean yet there are several auto tune spots and just so-so background vocals in certain places, which seem par for the course in today’s urban market. Thus, the question is not whether Palmer has very good vocal capabilities. It is a matter of whether her music at this point can stand toe to toe with the more prolific urban vocal talent hitting the charts today."

TerrellVanity.com also gave it a positive review saying that the tracks "SuperJerkin", "Keke’s Love", "Hard To Breathe", and "The One you Call" were their favorite tracks. They also said that they could see "Get Out My Head" being played on the radio.

== Track listing ==
No.	Title	Writer(s)	Length
1.	"Top of the World"	Mischke Butler; Robert S. Nevil; Keke Palmer	3:19
2.	"Edit (You Out My Life)"	Courtney Harrell; Gary Spriggs; Sean Richard Marshall	3:50
3.	"New Boyfriend"	Brandon Howard; Butler; L'Oreal Palmer; K. Palmer	3:06
4.	"Super Jerking"	Crystal Nicole; Tobias Gad; L. Palmer; K. Palmer	3:14
5.	"Keke's Love"	Butler; K. Palmer	4:24
6.	"Hard to Breathe"	Nicholas Furlong; Dean Cover	3:18
7.	"Get Out My Head"	Brian Seals Kennedy; Butler; L. Palmer; K. Palmer	4:18
8.	"The One You Call"	Theron Feemster; Ericka J. Coulter	3:06
9.	"Shut Up, Stop Lying" (bonus track)	Christopher “C4″ Umana, Atozzio Towns	4:00
10.	"Change It Up" (theme song from True Jackson, VP) (bonus track)	Gad; K. Palmer	2:35

== The One You Call ==
"The One You Call"

Single by Keke Palmer

from the album Awaken
- Released: December 7, 2010
- Recorded: 2010
- Length: 3:06
- Label: Interscope Records
- Songwriters: Theron Feemster; Ericka J. Coulter
- Producer: Neff-U

Keke Palmer singles chronology
"Keep It Movin'" (2007)	"The One You Call" (2010)	"The Greatest" (2011)

"The One You Call" is the only single released from Keke Palmer's first mixtape Awaken. The song was released December 7, 2010. On January 27, 2011 the song was sent to urban radio. The official music video was released November 23, 2010. Due to lack of promotion and radio airplay, the song failed to chart anywhere, unlike her previous single, which charted on the "Portugal Singles Top 50" chart at number 30. It was only played 272 times on the US radio, during 2010.

=== Music video ===
The official music video was released November 23, 2010. It was directed by Gabe Evans and Ryan Parma. The video shows the singer hanging out with her friends while Palmer's love interest starts calling and texting her on her phone. However, she knows that he just broke up with his girlfriend and now he's going through his phone to see who will pick up.

=== Scratch That DJ Contest ===
On February 20, 2011 Palmer started a contest called the "Scratch That DJ Contest". Palmer started the contest to find a DJ that could travel with her for her upcoming tour. To enter the contest the DJ must create a new version of Palmer's single "The One You Call". On March 6, 2011 Palmer released an acapella version of the song on her official YouTube channel.

== Awaken Reloaded ==
Awaken Reloaded

Mixtape (reissue) by Keke Palmer
- Released: August 22, 2011
- Recorded: 2009–2011
- Genre: Pop; R&B
- Length: 62:22
- Label: Interscope
- Producer: Toby Gad; Warren "Oak" Felder; Lashaunda "Babygirl" Carr; Kendrick "Wyldcard" Dean; Theron "Neff-U" Feemster; Brian Kennedy; Matthew Gerrard; Brandon Howard; Kadis & Sean; Fernando Garibay; Christopher "C4" Urama

Keke Palmer chronology
Awaken (2011)	Awaken Reloaded (2011)	Rags (Music from the Original Movie) (2012)

Singles from Awaken Reloaded
- 1. "The Greatest" Released: July 12, 2011; 2. "Walls Come Down" Released: July 12, 2011

Awaken Reloaded is the reissue of American singer Keke Palmer's debut mixtape Awaken (2011). The maturity of the songs on the mixtape shows how Keke has grown. It was released on August 22, 2011.

"The Greatest" was released on July 12, 2011 as the first single from the mixtape. A preview for the song was premiered via Palmer's YouTube channel on June 28, 2011. The song was also appears on the premiere of the eleventh season of Degrassi.

The solo version of "Walls Come Down" was released as second single for streaming on July 11, 2011 and was later released to iTunes on July 12, 2011.

=== Track listing ===
No.	Title	Writer(s)	Length
1.	"Melody for Cheaters"	Amber Granderson; Lashaunda Carr	3:41
2.	"Slow Dance"	David Quiñones; Warren Felder; K. Palmer	3:51
3.	"Parachute"	Mischke Butler; Tobias Gad; L'Oreal Palmer; K. Palmer	3:32
4.	"Get Out My Head"	Butler; Brian Kennedy; L. Palmer; K. Palmer	3:52
5.	"It’s a Wrap"	Butler; Matthew Gerrard; K. Palmer	3:30
6.	"Shut Up, Stop Lyin"	Atozzio Towns; Christopher Urama	4:00
7.	"The One You Call"	Erika Coulter; Theron Feemster	3:06
8.	"Keke's Love"	Butler; Palmer	4:24
9.	"New Boyfriend"	Butler; Brandon Howard; L. Palmer; K. Palmer	3:06
10.	"Facebook Stalker"	Butler; Kendrick Dean; L. Palmer; K. Palmer	3:19
11.	"Edit (You Out of My Life)"	Courtney Harrell; Gary Spriggs; Sean Marshall	3:50
12.	"Hologram"	Crystal Nicole Johnson; Gad; L. Palmer; K. Palmer	4:32
13.	"Nothin’ on You" (featuring Mishon)	Butler; K. Palmer	1:17
14.	"I’m Gone / Mini Mogul / Biology"	Mario James; Printz Board; L. Palmer; K. Palmer//Johnson; Carr//Butler; Gad; K. Palmer; L. Palmer	4:23
15.	"Walls Come Down"	Steven Battey; Carlos Battey; Peter Gene Hernandez; Philip Lawrence; Fernando Garibay	3:54
16.	"The Greatest"	Andrew McKinney; Makeda Davis; K. Palmer	3:54

Deluxe edition bonus track
No.	Title	Writer(s)	Length
17.	"Walls Come Down" (featuring Bruno Mars)	Steven Battey; Carlos Battey; Peter Gene Hernandez; Philip Lawrence; Fernando Garibay	3:54
