= Snack (song) =

2020 single by Keke Palmer

Single by Keke Palmer

from the album Virgo Tendencies, Pt. 1
- Released: July 10, 2020
- Recorded: 2018
- Genre: Pop; R&B
- Length: 3:15
- Label: Poetic Pen; Big Bosses
- Songwriters: Alexander Lloyd; Che Olson; Lauren Palmer; Tasha Catour
- Producer: Tasha Catour

Keke Palmer singles chronology
"Thick" (2020)	"Snack" (2020)	"Deep Water" (2020)

"Snack" is a song by American singer Keke Palmer. It was released on July 10, 2020, through her label Big Bosses and Poetic Pen Music Group. Tasha Catour produced "Snack" and co-wrote it with Palmer, Che Olsen and Alexander Lloyd. An accompanying lyric video was released on the same day of the song's release. It was released as the third single for her third extended play (EP) Virgo Tendencies, Pt. 1.

"Snack" was praised by critics, partially for its sexual lyrics and instrumental. A music video, directed by Rosero McCoy, was released on July 15, 2020, through Palmer's official YouTube account.

== Release and promotion ==
Palmer co-wrote "Snack" with its producer Tasha Catour and songwriter Che Olson. It was released on July 10, 2020, alongside an accompanying lyric video. "Snack" was the follow-up to her previous singles "Sticky" and "Thick". Two weeks before the song's release, Palmer posted the single cover on her Instagram account and announced the song's release date. Many social media users and fans compared Palmer's look in the song's artwork cover to Rihanna.

Palmer posted a short clip of her in a swimming pool with half of the second verse of "Snack" playing on July 7, three days prior to the song's official release. Although Palmer promoted it as a "new single" on her social media, the song was originally released in 2018. Palmer performed the song on Music Choice's new artist initiative series Primed in June 2018. Palmer performed "Snack" live for the first time on August 28, 2020, at the 2020 MTV Video Music Awards.

== Composition and lyrics ==
"Snack" is an uptempo trap-influenced urban pop and R&B song that lasts three minutes and 15-seconds. The song is written in the key of G-flat major and is set in common time with a moderate dance groove with 160 beats per minute (BPM). Marquin Stanley of Karen Civil described "Snack" as an "upbeat hip hop and pop infused record" and praised the lyrics, describing them as "confident" and "sultry". Stanley also said that "Snack" was a "perfect addition" to a summer playlist. Ana Reis of Papelpop wrote that Palmer sings sexual lyrics, saying she wants to look like "a snack". Daniel Pacônio of Febre Teen described the song as "daring" and added that the song's instrumental and beats "will drive you crazy". Jazmin Williams of The Honey Pop! said the track opens with a "really fun beat". Williams also deemed the chorus as "really really catchy".

== Critical reception ==
Upon its release, "Snack" received positive reviews from music critics. Brittany Burton of Respect described "Snack" as an "impressive track". Meredith B. Kile‍ of Entertainment Tonight described it as a "mid-summer bop about looking so good you feel delicious". Keithan Samuels of Rated R&B described "Snack" as an "anthemic tune". Soul-Addict.com deemed the song "very effective and energetic". Bryant Lydell of The Top Tea wrote that Palmer "offers up catchy lyrics over a refreshing beat".

== Music video ==
Palmer, in a scene from the video.

On July 15, 2020, Palmer posted a preview of the single's music video and announced its release via her Instagram account. The official music video exclusively premiered on Cosmopolitan the next day. It was later uploaded to Palmer's YouTube account. Rosero McCoy directed the single's music video while production was handled by Quenton Burdette and Daniel Button.

The video begins with a '90s-inspired retro VHS effect with the title "KEKE" quickly appearing on it and then showing Palmer in a Giuseppe di Morabito-designed double breasted purple blazer dress as the camera begins to close up on her, with the song title "SNACK" appearing soon after. Throughout the video, Palmer is shown in front of airbrushed background swearing girly girl-styled outfits (one including an airbrush t-shirt) along with shimmery liquid-and-stick eyeshadow and high-festive asymmetrical hairstyles, which critics later assumed were inspired by those of the 1990s.

A day after the music video was released, Palmer posted a video via her Instagram account of her backstage during the filming for the music video. She also captioned the clip with a "cheeky message" and asked fans their opinion on how she looks in the video. "Whew chiiiiiiiile!! THE DOLL IS HERE—What's ya favorite look from #SNACK video?? 🤩," she wrote.

== Release history ==
Release history for "Snack"
Region	Date	Format	Label	Ref.
Various	July 10, 2020	Digital download; streaming	Poetic Pen; Big Bosses	
