= DivaGurl =

American girl group

- Origin: Los Angeles, United States
- Genres: R&B; hip-hop
- Years active: 2024–present
- Label: Virgin Music Group
- Members: Keke Palmer; Sadé; LaShay
- Past members: Monét; Chanté

DivaGurl is an American girl group and dance ensemble formed by entertainment label Big Bosses Entertainment, in partnership with Virgin Music Group. The group is composed of three members: Keke Palmer, Sadé, and LaShay.

The group released their debut song titled "S.O.B." (2024), which later was included in their debut extended play (EP) DivaGurl: A Story by Keke Palmer, the next year. The three-piece ensemble originally had two more members, Monét and Chanté, who have since departed from the group.

== History ==
=== 2024–present: Formation and introduction ===
In 2024, American singer and actress Keke Palmer announced she would be participating in an upcoming girl group through social media platform Instagram. DivaGurl released their debut single "S.O.B." (Standing on Business) on June 21, 2024. On August 23, they released the single "Rock With You". On January 17, 2025, DivaGurl released an EP, titled DivaGurl: A Story By Keke Palmer, containing two additional bonus singles: "Leave Me Alone", and "Afford It", which was featured in the 2025 movie One of Them Days starring Palmer and her friend, singer SZA.

On December 22, 2025, Keke Palmer released two singles featuring Diva Gurl: "Luh Me Longtime" and "Neva Had".

== Discography ==
=== Extended plays ===
List of extended plays, with selected details
Title	Details
DivaGurl: A Story by Keke Palmer	Released: January 17, 2025; Label: Virgin Music Group; Format: Digital download, streaming

=== Singles ===
List of singles, showing year released, and album name
Title	Year	Album
"S.O.B."	2024	Non-album singles
"Rock With You"	2024	Non-album singles
"Leave Me Alone"	2025	Non-album singles
"Afford It"	2025	Non-album singles

== See also ==
- Keke Palmer
