= Eva zu Beck =

Polish travel blogger, vlogger and TV host (born 1991)

- Born: Ewa Bianka Zubek; 26 April 1991 (age 35); Poland
- Education: University of Oxford
- Occupations: Travel blogger; vlogger; television host

YouTube information
- Channel: Eva zu Beck
- Genre: Travel vlogs
- Subscribers: 1.9 million
- Views: 188 million
- Last updated: February 2026
- Website: evazubeck.com

Eva zu Beck (born Ewa Bianka Zubek on 26 April 1991) is a Polish travel and adventure blogger, vlogger and presenter. She has travelled to 60 countries including Mongolia, Pakistan, where she lived for over a year, Afghanistan, Yemen and Iraq. Zu Beck has hosted National Geographic programmes including Superskilled with Eva zu Beck, for which she was nominated for a 2026 Daytime Emmy Award. She also published a memoir in 2026. According to Breanna Wilson of Field Mag, "A major part of the Polish traveler's appeal is that she manages to make living in the remotest parts of Pakistan or exploring the streets of Afghanistan appealing, even as a solo female traveler.

== Early life and career ==
Zu Beck was born on 26 April 1991 in Poland, the oldest of three children raised by a single mother, and grew up in Wrocław. She moved with her family to England around the age of 12. She was educated at The Henley College (2007–2009) and then studied German and French languages at the University of Oxford, graduating in 2013. She worked at the European Parliament in Brussels and in several other jobs, and for four years in London for Culture Trip, a travel media start-up, but she became unhappy with her conventional life; she left to travel in Nepal in late 2017, decided to try travel vlogging and soon moved to Pakistan, which she had read was among the most dangerous countries in the world.

She gained wide attention in 2018 after posting a "Kiki Challenge" video on YouTube to celebrate Pakistan's independence day, dancing draped in the country's flag, which also drew accusations of disrespecting the flag. She travelled by horseback in Mongolia in 2019. In 2020, she hosted TRT World's show, A Place Called Pakistan, and presented a Euronews YouTube miniseries called Rerouted: The Balkans. She joined BBC's The Travel Show as a presenter, reporting on the clean-up of the Mexican wetlands from the canals of Xochimilco and a 450 dog-sled race in Yukon, Canada, marking the 125th anniversary of the Klondike Gold Rush.

== North America, Superskilled and return to Poland ==
In early 2022 she began a road trip of the Americas while living in a converted Land Rover Defender that she named Odyssey, which she had shipped from Germany to Mexico. Her goal was to drive to the northern tip of Alaska and then to the southern tip of South America. While her truck was en route to Mexico, zu Beck flew to Antarctica in early February 2022 where she was among a group that climbed to the summit of Mount Vinson, the Antarctic's tallest peak with a height of 4,892 m (16,050 ft). After driving from Mexico into the U.S., she bought a German Shepherd puppy, Wilk, and continued north, vlogging through the U.S. and Canada. In the fall of 2022, she reached the northern tip of Alaska and briefly swam in the frigid waters of the Arctic Ocean. She then drove south through the US and Canada again and re-entered Mexico. While still in Mexico, in March 2023, she abandoned her goal of driving through central and South America and took a break from vlogging.

She participated together with Wilk in the 2024 Lapland Arctic Ultra, but dropped out after 100 km due to a paw injury suffered by Wilk. In July 2024, she finished in third position among women – and tenth overall – in the Gobi March 250 km ultramarathon. In March 2025, she successfully completed the Lapland Arctic Ultra, 500 km distance. Zu Beck starred in the miniseries Superskilled with Eva zu Beck (2024–2025), an exploration and adventure series on National Geographic's YouTube channel and later Disney+ and ABC.com, which was a nominee for a Shorty Award. In 2024 she purchased a remote property in Poland and, in 2025, moved onto the land, where she lives in a tent or a small shepherd's hut, between travels, and keeps horses. In 2025, she won Outdoor Media Summit's award for "YouTube Channel of the Year". Her second season starring in Superskilled began in November 2025. Zu Beck was nominated for a 2026 Daytime Emmy Award as Outstanding Daytime Personality – Non-Daily, while Superskilled received three nominations, including Outstanding Travel and Adventure Program.

== Memoir and later activities ==
Zu Beck's memoir of her travels, The Wilder Way, was published by Penguin Books's Century imprint in 2026. She was interviewed on This Morning and featured in The Sunday Times and other media. Kelly McClure wrote in Salon that the book "make[s] the reader not only believe that such adventures are a possibility, but also a soul-enriching necessity ... it will surely help you see how easily a fuller [life] can be had". Later the same year she was featured in the Genius Trait video series by Genius Inc.

== Personal life ==
Zu Beck was married in 2016 and lived in Brussels with her Belgian husband, separating in 2017 and ending the marriage in 2018 before launching her travel career.
