= Keke Palmer =

American actress, singer, and television host (born 1993)

- Palmer in 2025
- Born: Lauren Keyana Palmer; August 26, 1993 (age 33); Harvey, Illinois, U.S.
- Occupations: Actress; singer; television host
- Years active: 2002–present
- Partner: Darius Jackson (2021–2023)
- Children: 1
- Awards: Full list
- Musical career
- Origin: Robbins, Illinois, U.S.
- Genres: R&B; pop; hip hop
- Instrument: Vocals
- Labels: Atlantic; Interscope; Island; eOne; SRG/ILS
- Member of: DivaGurl
- Website: kekepalmer.com

Lauren Keyana "Keke" Palmer (/ˈkiːki/ KEE-kee; born August 26, 1993) is an American actress, singer, and television host. She has received numerous accolades, including two Primetime Emmy Awards and a Daytime Emmy Award, in addition to nominations for an Actor Award and four Critics' Choice Awards. Time magazine included her on its list of most influential people in the world in 2019.

Palmer made her film debut as a child with roles in the films Barbershop 2: Back in Business and The Wool Cap (both 2004), before achieving her breakthrough role as Akeelah Anderson in the drama film Akeelah and the Bee (2006). Her career progressed with roles in films such as Madea's Family Reunion (2006), Jump In! (2007), The Longshots (2008), and Shrink (2009), and the release of her debut studio album So Uncool (2007). She rose to prominence on Nickelodeon, playing the title character in the sitcom True Jackson, VP (2008–2011), providing the voice of Aisha in the revival of Winx Club (2011–2014), and headlining the television film Rags (2012).

Palmer transitioned to mainstream roles with the VH1 biographical film CrazySexyCool: The TLC Story (2013), and afterwards made her Broadway debut as Ella in Rodgers + Hammerstein's Cinderella (2014–2015). She has since starred in the Fox satirical horror series Scream Queens (2015–2016), the Epix drama series Berlin Station (2017–2019), and the slasher series Scream (2019). Her film roles include Animal (2014), Pimp (2018), Hustlers (2019), Nope (2022), and One of Them Days (2025), with the last two earning her critical attention. Also in the 2020s, she released two more studio albums.

Outside of acting, Palmer has hosted the talk shows Just Keke (2014) and Strahan, Sara and Keke (2019–2020), as well as the game show Password since 2022. She launched KeyTV Network, an online entertainment content platform, in 2021, and released her second book, Master of Me, a hybrid memoir and self-help manual, in 2024.

== Early life ==
Lauren Keyana Palmer was born on August 26, 1993, in Harvey, Illinois, and was raised in nearby Robbins, Illinois. She grew up in a Catholic household. Her parents, Sharon and Lawrence "Larry" Palmer, who met in drama school, had both worked as professional actors before settling into full-time jobs. Her father, who is a Catholic deacon, works for a polyurethane company. Her mother is a high school teacher who works with autistic children.

The nickname "Keke" is not a shortening of "Keyana": according to Palmer, her name came about because her older sister, Loreal, had an imaginary friend named Keke before she was born. In an interview with Glamour in 2022, Palmer said she prefers to go by Lauren and said she would like to be called by her given name "more than anything". Palmer first sang in a church and performed at a stage show at a Chicago tourist destination. In 2002, she auditioned for a stage production of The Lion King at age nine.

== Career ==
=== 2000s ===
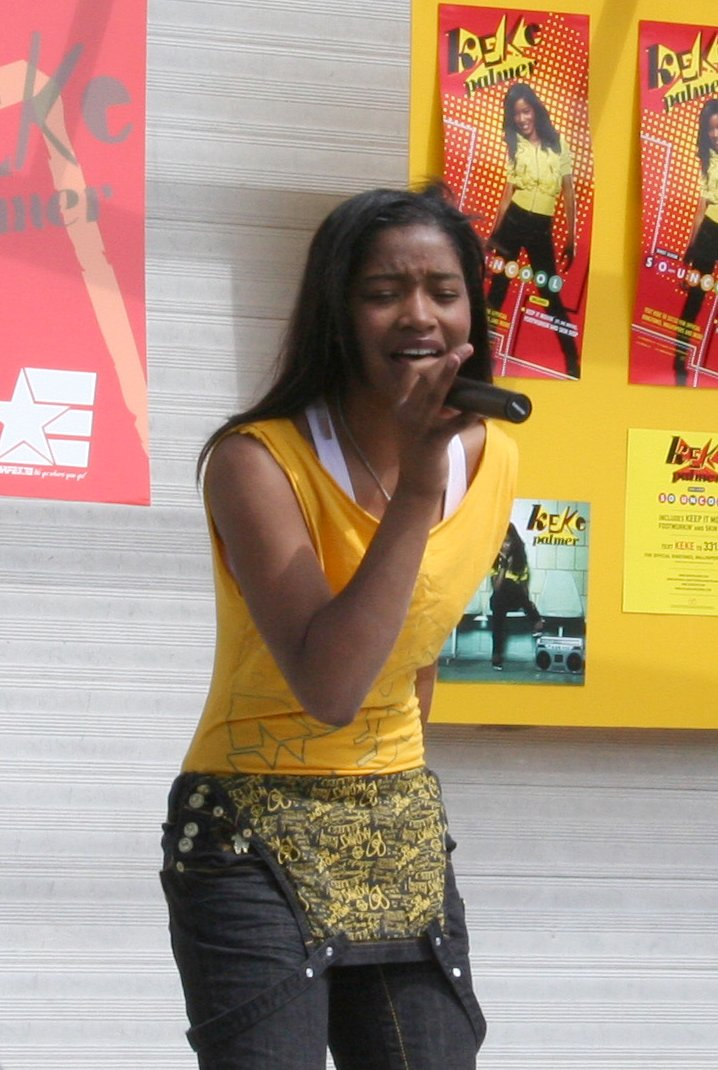
Palmer performing in March 2008

In 2004, Palmer gained her first film role in Barbershop 2: Back in Business. In 2005, she signed a record deal with Atlantic Records. That same year, she was featured in the television film Knights of the South Bronx, as well as starring in the television series Second Time Around and ER. That same year, producer Ralph Farquhar helped Palmer book the starring role in a Disney Channel pilot titled Keke and Jamal. The pilot was not picked up, and never aired.

In 2006, Palmer had her acting breakthrough starring in the film Akeelah and the Bee, playing the titular Akeelah, a bright 11-year-old who comes from a poor neighborhood and competes in the Scripps National Spelling Bee. Moira Macdonald of The Seattle Times wrote that Palmer "makes an appealing heroine". For the role, she won a Black Reel Award and an NAACP Image Award. She also had a supporting role in the 2006 film Madea's Family Reunion. The following year, Palmer appeared in the thriller Cleaner. She portrayed a lead role in the television film Jump In!. Palmer also starred in two television programs Tyler Perry's House of Payne and Just Jordan. Palmer released her debut album So Uncool on September 18, 2007. The album charted at number 86 on the US Billboard Top R&B/Hip-Hop Albums chart.

In 2008, Palmer began her starring role as the title character in Nickelodeon sitcom True Jackson, VP. Palmer also wrote and performed the theme song for the series. Palmer earned $20,000 per episode of True Jackson, VP, which made her the fourth-highest-paid child star on television. In July 2009, designer Jane Siskin created a Walmart fashion line inspired by True Jackson, VP, with all the designs being approved by Palmer. She also played the lead role in the 2008 film The Longshots. True Jackson, VP ended in 2011.

=== 2010s ===
Palmer debuted as the voice of Aisha in Nickelodeon's revival of Winx Club. She received an NAACP Image Award nomination for her voiceover work. In 2012, Palmer starred in the film Joyful Noise, released in January 2012. She produced and starred in Rags, a television musical film, as well as voiced Peaches in Ice Age: Continental Drift. In July 2012, Palmer released the single "You Got Me" featuring Kevin McCall. The video for the single was released on July 11, 2012. She released a self-titled mixtape Keke Palmer on October 1, 2012.

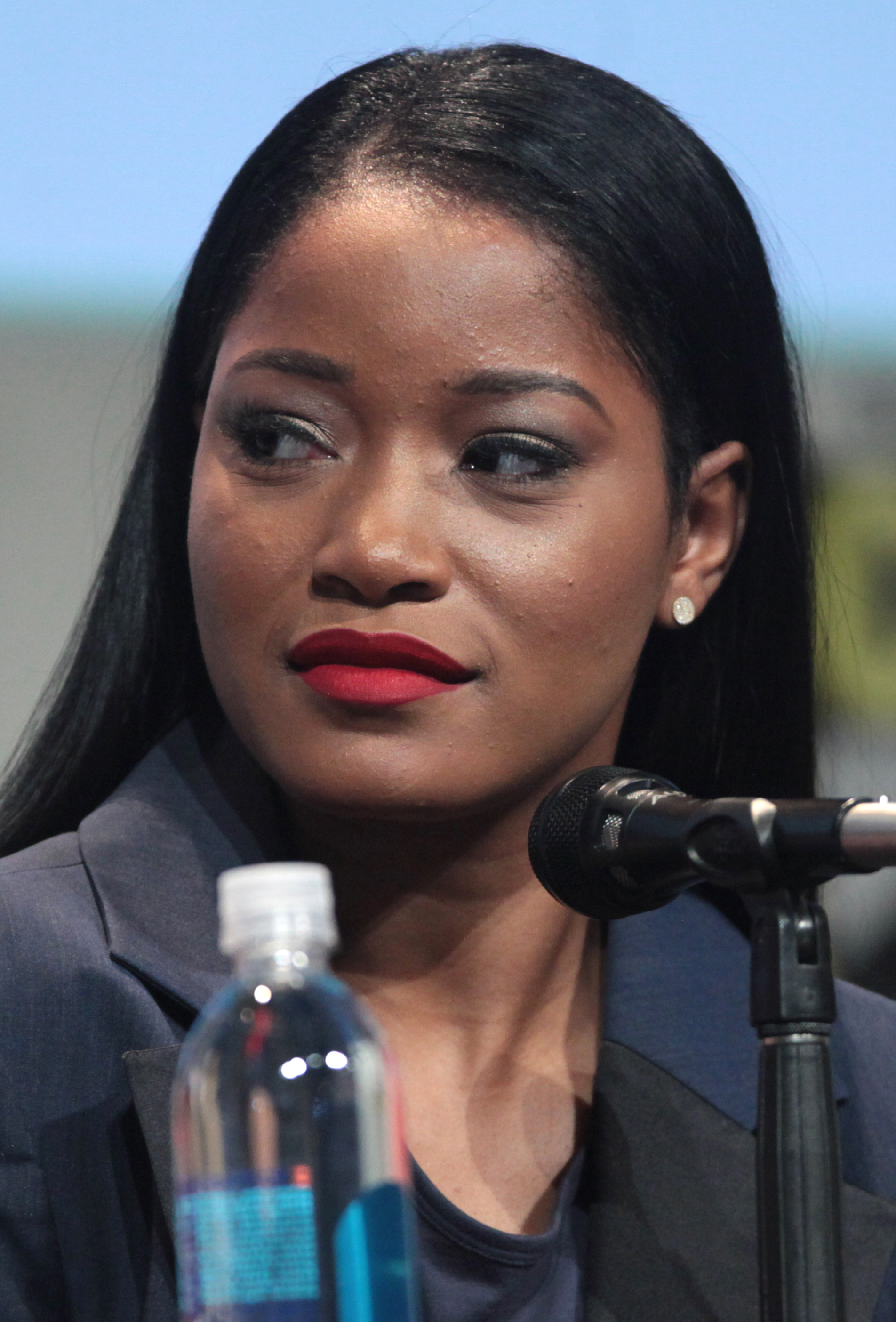
Palmer at the 2015 San Diego Comic-Con

In 2013, Palmer portrayed Rozonda "Chilli" Thomas in the TLC biopic, CrazySexyCool: The TLC Story, which aired in October on VH1. In 2014, she starred in the horror film Animal, which was released on June 17. Palmer then recurred during the second season of Showtime's drama series Masters of Sex, portraying Coral, a nanny. That same year, Palmer hosted a daytime talk show on BET titled Just Keke. In doing so, she became one of the youngest talk show hosts in television history; the show itself has been regarded as "groundbreaking" and "refreshing". In September 2014, Palmer became the first African American to star as the title character in the musical Cinderella on Broadway. She performed her final show during the closing night of the show's run on January 4, 2015. Later that year, Palmer announced that she had signed with Island Records.

Between September 2015 and December 2016, she starred as Zayday Williams in the horror comedy series Scream Queens, created by Ryan Murphy. In January 2016, Palmer starred as Marty Maraschino in the television special Grease: Live. Rolling Stone's Brittany Spanos regarded Palmer's performance "a standout" and highlighted her "assertiveness, confidence and biting sense of humor". In June, Palmer released Waited to Exhale, an album she wrote during her time on True Jackson, VP that went unreleased due to label issues and her "anxiety-driven hesitance". On November 4, Palmer released her second extended play, titled Lauren, with a 17-minute short film of the same name being released exclusively on Billboard's website. In 2017, Palmer released her memoir, I Don't Belong to You: Quiet the Noise and Find Your Voice. That same year, she joined the drama series Berlin Station during its second season.

In April 2019, Palmer began guest co-hosting ABC's daytime talk show Strahan and Sara, sporadically filling in for co-host Michael Strahan and more regularly beginning in June during co-host Sara Haines's maternity leave. She joined the slasher television series Scream as a series regular in its third season, portraying a character named Kym Johnson, which premiered on July 8, 2019. On August 26, Palmer became a third permanent co-host of Strahan and Sara, which was then re-titled Strahan, Sara and Keke. In September, Palmer starred as a "lovestruck stripper" in the crime drama film Hustlers, directed by Lorene Scafaria. She sang the song "Giants" as part of a virtual group named True Damage, in which she voices a character named Senna, in the video game League of Legends for the 2019 World Championship. The song features singers Becky G and Soyeon as well as rappers Duckwrth and Thutmose as the other group members. In November, True Damage performed the song live during the opening ceremony of the finals.

=== 2020s ===
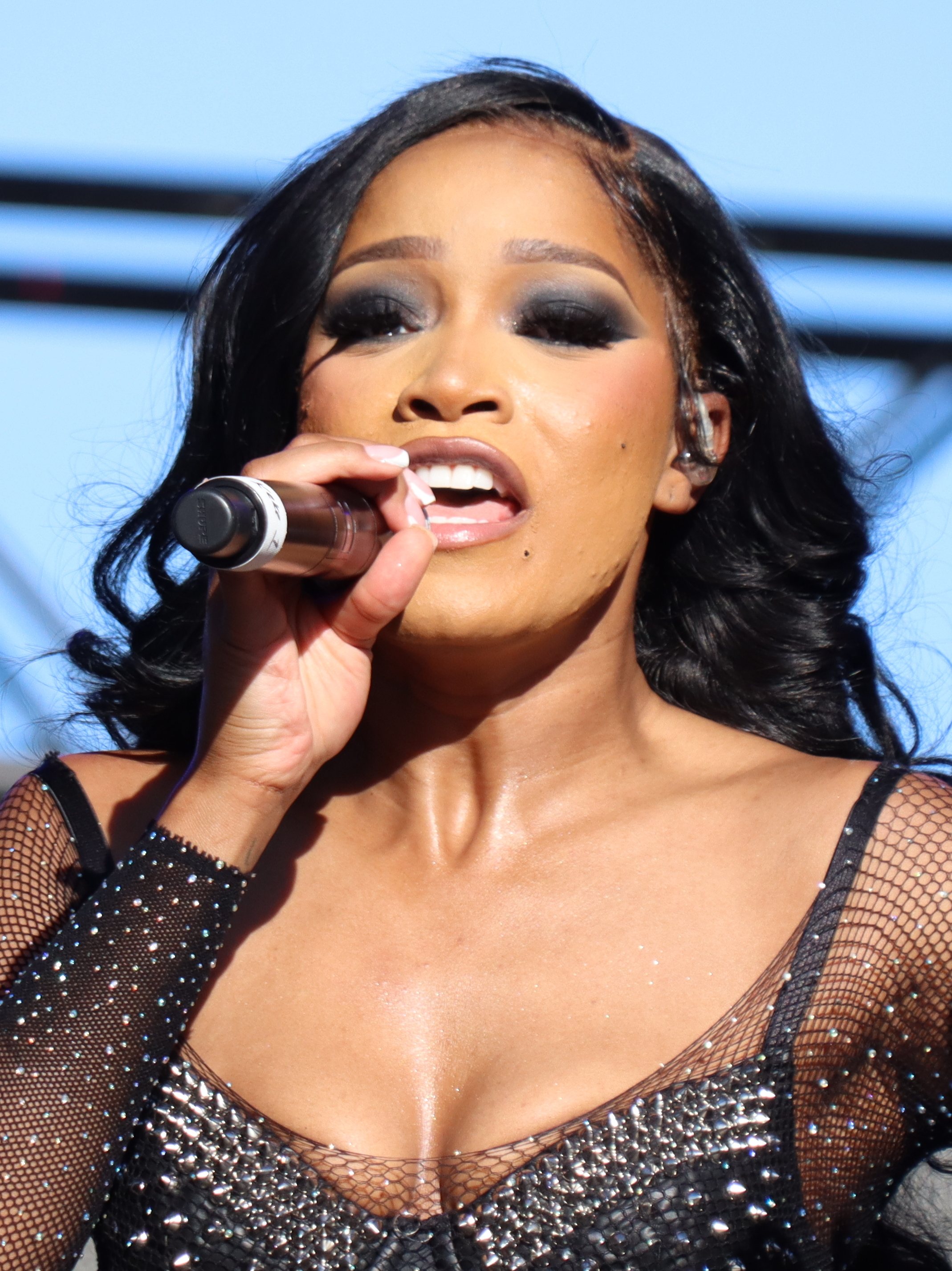
Palmer performing at the Capital Pride Festival in 2024

Strahan, Sara and Keke ended unexpectedly in March 2020 when the COVID-19 pandemic ended live studio programming through the industry, and ABC decided to shift the timeslot towards news. Palmer later received a Daytime Emmy Award nomination for Outstanding Entertainment Talk Show Host alongside Haines and Strahan. That same year, Palmer began starring in a web television comedy series titled Turnt Up with the Taylors, in which she portrays all of the characters. She released an extended play titled Virgo Tendencies, Pt. 1 on August 28. On August 30, Palmer hosted the 2020 MTV Video Music Awards, during which she also performed her song "Snack".

In December 2020, she released a follow-up EP – Virgo Tendencies, Pt. 2 – . The following year, Palmer won the Primetime Emmy Award for Outstanding Actress in a Short Form Comedy or Drama Series for her performance in Turnt Up with the Taylors. Later in the same year, Palmer briefly hosted a reboot of the classic 90's MTV dating show Singled Out with Joel Kim Booster as her co-host for the short-lived online streaming service network Quibi. In 2021, she hosted the reality competition series Foodtastic for Disney+.

In 2022, Palmer starred in Alice, directed by Krystin Ver Linden, which had its world premiere at the 2022 Sundance Film Festival. She served as narrator on Not So Pretty, a documentary investigating the beauty industry directed by Kirby Dick and Amy Ziering for HBO Max. Palmer also voiced the character of Izzy Hawthorne in the Pixar animated film Lightyear, a spinoff of the Toy Story film series. That same year, she starred as Emerald Haywood in the Jordan Peele-directed science-fiction horror Nope for which she received critical attention; her performance won the New York Film Critics Circle Award for Best Supporting Actress. In August 2022, Palmer debuted as host of an NBC reboot of the game show Password, with Jimmy Fallon as executive producer/permanent celebrity guest. For the last three episodes of Karma's World, in September 2022, Palmer voiced Cece Dupree, a conniving and ruthless rapper.

On February 9, 2023, it was announced that Palmer was set to star alongside Sacha Baron Cohen in the David O. Russell film Super Toys. The film is a period piece set in the 1970s. In June 2023, it was announced Palmer had been invited to join The Academy as an actor. Palmer starred in Usher's music video for his single "Boyfriend", which was released on August 16, 2023. In June 2024, Palmer started a girl group called DivaGurl; similar to The Pussycat Dolls, where Nicole Scherzinger is the lead singer, Palmer is the lead singer of DivaGurl. In 2025, Palmer co-headlined the film One of Them Days with SZA and received widespread critical acclaim.

On August 4, 2026, NBC announced Palmer would be the new host of The Voice in its 31st season set to premiere in 2027, replacing long-time host, Carson Daly.

== Other ventures ==
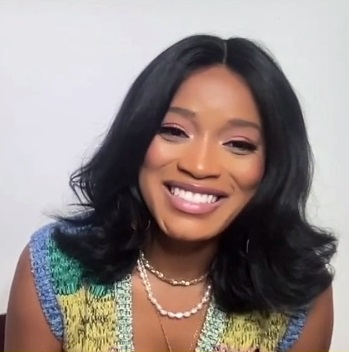
Palmer in 2022

Palmer hosts her own podcast, Baby, This is Keke Palmer. Her biography I Don't Belong to You: Quiet the Noise and Find Your Voice was published on January 31, 2017. In November 2024, Palmer released her second book Master of Me: The Secret to Controlling Your Narrative. The book debuted at number thirteen on the Publishers Weekly Bestseller List, selling 9,163 units in its first week.

Palmer works with the Boys' and Girls' Clubs of the American charity Cool To Be Smart program, speaking to children about the importance of learning. She is also a supporter of Urban Farming and the Girl Scouts. She has worked with the YWCA and Saving Our Daughters. As of 2010, Palmer has been a representative for the Saving Our Daughters project, an anti-bullying campaign. She is a supporter of the Black Lives Matter movement. In 2020, she marched in Hollywood, California, as part of the George Floyd protests. That same year, she addressed the movement during her opening monologue at the 2020 MTV Video Music Awards.

Palmer was included in Time's 100 Next list in November 2019, which "spotlights 100 rising stars who are shaping the future of business, entertainment, sports, politics, science, health and more."

In 2022, Palmer launched a digital entertainment content platform, titled KeyTV Network. In 2026, Palmer began serving as a mentor for UCLA students studying in the School of Theater, Film and Television as part of their "Artist-In-Residence" program. Palmer's KeyTV distributes three student projects annually.

== Artistry ==
Palmer's first studio album, So Uncool, was heavily influenced by contemporary R&B, and was described by the album's producers as "bright, bouncy, and melodic enough to appeal to teens and pre-teens. Fans of dancey teen pop will want to give this auspicious debut a listen." Palmer was influenced by American R&B singers Ciara, Janet Jackson, Michael Jackson, Mariah Carey, Aaliyah, Brandy, Mary J. Blige, and Whitney Houston as well as girl group TLC. Among her R&B influences, Palmer also cites pop artists Gwen Stefani, Selena, and Avril Lavigne.

== Personal life ==
=== Health ===
Palmer has amblyopia, and has dealt with polyendocrine metabolic ovarian syndrome for much of her life. She has also struggled with anxiety and depression.

=== Sexuality ===
Palmer has said she does not want her sexuality defined by labels; she believes that people should be fluid with labelling themselves, as their identities can change. In February 2017, during an interview on The Wendy Williams Show, when asked by Williams whether she was sexually fluid, Palmer replied, "Yeah, I like whoever loves me. Love is defined by the individual, and what I feel today is not what I necessarily may feel five years from now. I don't want to limit myself to one feeling or one idea of anything." While accepting an award at the Los Angeles LGBT Center in 2023, Palmer said she had "always felt accepted by and a part of" the LGBTQ community.

In 2019, as part of the #YouKnowMe campaign, she shared via Twitter that she had an abortion at the age of 24. In an interview with People magazine in 2024, Palmer disclosed that she was molested as a child and did not realize it until she read a book about sexual abuse.

On February 14, 2026, Palmer posted in an Instagram caption that she is "almost 100% sure [she's] asexual." However, in an interview with the Tea Time podcast, Palmer clarified that this was a joke.

=== Relationships ===
Palmer spoke publicly about her turbulent relationship with singer Trey Songz after he allegedly tricked her into being in a music video while at a party in 2017. Palmer accused the singer of "sexual intimidation", disclosing that she hid in a closet to avoid being filmed and berated by Songz, only to later realize that he and his friends had recorded her without prior knowledge or consent. Songz denied the claims during an interview on The Breakfast Club radio show, stating, "I did not put her in the video without her permission. I don't care that much to sneak Keke Palmer in the video for two seconds."

In June 2021, Palmer began dating fitness instructor Darius Jackson. While hosting Saturday Night Live on December 3, 2022, Palmer announced she was expecting her first child with Jackson. Their son was born in February 2023. Palmer and Jackson separated in October 2023, following a series of alleged incidents surrounding domestic violence throughout their relationship. In November of that year, Palmer was granted a temporary restraining order against Jackson as well as temporary sole custody of their son. She dropped the requests in May 2024 and their domestic violence restraining order hearing was canceled.

== Filmography ==
Key
†	Denotes films that have not yet been released

=== Film ===
Year	Title	Role	Notes
2004	Barbershop 2: Back in Business	Gina's Niece	
2006	Akeelah and the Bee	Akeelah Anderson	
2006	Madea's Family Reunion	Nikki Grady	
2007	Cleaner	Rose Cutler	
2008	The Longshots	Jasmine Plummer	
2008	Unstable Fables: Tortoise vs. Hare	Crystal Tortoise (voice)	
2009	Shrink	Jemma	
2012	Ice Age: Continental Drift	Peaches (voice)	
2012	Joyful Noise	Olivia Hill	
2012	Winx Club: The Secret of the Lost Kingdom	Aisha (voice)	
2013	Winx Club 3D: Magical Adventure	Aisha (voice)	
2014	Animal	Alissa	
2014	Imperial Dreams	Samaara	
2015	Brotherly Love	Jackie	
2016	Ice Age: Collision Course	Peaches (voice)	
2018	Pimp	Wednesday	
2019	Hustlers	Mercedes	
2020	2 Minutes of Fame	Sky	
2022	Alice	Alice	
2022	Jennifer Lopez: Halftime	Herself	Documentary film
2022	Lightyear	Izzy Hawthorne (voice)	
2022	Nope	Emerald "Em" Haywood	
2022	Being Mortal		Abandoned film
2023	Under the Boardwalk	Ramona (voice)	
2024	This Is Me... Now: A Love Story	Scorpio	
2025	One of Them Days	Dreux	Also executive producer
2025	The Pickup	Zoe	
2025	Good Fortune	Elena	
2025	The Tiger	Monica	Short film
2026	I Love Boosters	Corvette	Also executive producer
2026	Central Park Tale †	(voice)	In production
2026	The Angry Birds Movie 3 †	(voice)	In production
2027	Spaceballs: The New One †	Destiny	Post-production
TBA	Lottery †		Pre-production

=== Television ===
Year	Title	Role	Notes
2004	Cold Case	Arletta (1939)	Episode: "The Letter"
2004	Strong Medicine	Sarina	Episode: "Healing Touch"
2004	The Wool Cap	Lou	Television film
2005	ER	Janell Parkerson	Episode: "The Show Must Go On"
2005	Knights of the South Bronx	Kenya Russell	Television film
2005	Law & Order: Special Victims Unit	Tasha Wright	Episode: "Storm"
2005	Second Time Around	Sharlene	Episode: "Big Bank, Little Bank"
2007	Jump In!	Mary Thomas	Television film
2007	Just Jordan	C. C. Livingston	Episode: "Fame Game"
2007	Tyler Perry's House of Payne	Nikki Grady	Episode: "Bully and the Beast"
2008–2011	True Jackson, VP	True Jackson	Lead role
2010	The Cleveland Show	Brandi (voice)	Episode: "Harder, Better, Faster, Browner"
2011	Degrassi: The Next Generation	Herself	Episodes: "Boom Boom Pow: Part 1" and "Boom Boom Pow: Part 2"
2011–2014	Winx Club	Aisha (voice)	Main role (seasons 3–6)
2012	Abducted: The Carlina White Story	Carlina White	Television film
2012	Rags	Kadee Worth	Television film
2013	90210	Elizabeth Royce Harwood	Recurring role (season 5)
2013	CrazySexyCool: The TLC Story	Rozonda "Chilli" Thomas	Television film
2013	Full Circle	Chan'dra Stevens	Episodes: "Jace & Chan'dra" and "Chan'dra & Cliff"
2013	Key & Peele	Malia Obama's Anger Translator	Episode: "Obama Shutdown"
2014	Family Guy	Pam (voice)	Episode: "Baby Got Black"
2014	Grey's Anatomy	Sheryll Jeffries	Episode: "We Gotta Get Out of This Place"
2014	Just Keke	Herself	Host
2014	Masters of Sex	Coral Anders	Recurring role (season 2)
2014	Single Ladies	Herself	Episode: "The Girl Most Likely To..."
2014	The Trip to Bountiful	Thelma	Television film
2015–2016	Scream Queens	Zayday Williams	Main role
2016	Bubble Guppies	Stylee (voice)	Episode: "Guppy Style!"
2016	Ice Age: The Great Egg-Scapade	Peaches (voice)	Television special
2016	Grease: Live	Marty Maraschino	Television special
2016	Project Mc^{2}	Nov8 Agent	Episodes: "Bye Bye Birdie" and "Mission Totally Possible"
2016	Real Husbands of Hollywood	Herself	Episode: "The Suitor"
2017–2019	Berlin Station	April Lewis	Main role (seasons 2–3)
2017–2019	Star	Gigi Nixon	Recurring role (seasons 2–3)
2019	Robot Chicken	Fraülen Hapstein (voice)	Episode: "Musya Shakhtyorov in: Honeyboogers"
2019	Scream: Resurrection	Kym	Main role (season 3)
2019–2020	Strahan, Sara and Keke	Herself	Co-host
2020	The Disney Family Singalong: Volume II	Herself	Television special
2020	MTV Video Music Awards	Herself	Host
2020	Nickelodeon's Unfiltered	Herself	Episode: "Honey Bears Chew Gumballs"
2020	Singled Out	Herself	Host
2021–2025	Big Mouth	Rochelle Hillhurst (voice)	7 episodes
2021	2021 World Series	Herself	National anthem singer
2021	Insecure	Kira	Episode: "Pressure, Okay?"
2022	Not So Pretty	Narrator (voice)	Documentary
2022	Legendary	Herself	Judge (season 3)
2022	Karma's World	Cece Dupree (voice)	Episodes: "Save the Center, Part 1", "Save the Center, Part 2" and "Save the Center, Part 3"
2022	Saturday Night Live	Herself / Host	Episode: "Keke Palmer / SZA"
2022–2023	Human Resources	Rochelle Hillhurst (voice)	Main role
2022–2026	The Proud Family: Louder and Prouder	Maya Leibowitz-Jenkins (voice)	Main role
2022–present	Password	Herself	Host
2023	That's My Jam	Herself / Guest	Episode: "Keke Palmer & Saweetie vs. Joel McHale & will.i.am"
2023	The Jason Lee Show	Herself	Season 1, episode 17
2023	The Afterparty	"Danner"	Episode: "Vivian and Zoë"
2024	The Second Best Hospital in the Galaxy	Dr. Klak (voice)	Main role
2024	RuPaul's Drag Race All Stars	Herself / Guest Judge	Episode: "Drag Queens Save the World"
2026–present	The 'Burbs	Samira Fisher	Main role; also executive producer
2026	American Idol	Herself / Guest Mentor	2 episodes (season 24)

=== Video games ===
Year	Title	Role	Notes
2012	Ice Age: Continental Drift - Arctic Games	Peaches	

=== As producer only ===
Year	Title	Credits	Notes
2025	Southern Fried Rice	Producer	

== Discography ==
- So Uncool (2007)
- Big Boss (2023)
- Just Keke (2025)

== Concert tours ==
Headlining

- Footworkin' Concert Tour (2007)
- Big Boss Tour (2023)

Co-headlining

- Radio Disney Jingle Jam (with Mitchel Musso and Drew Seeley) (2007)
