= Danny Trejo filmography =

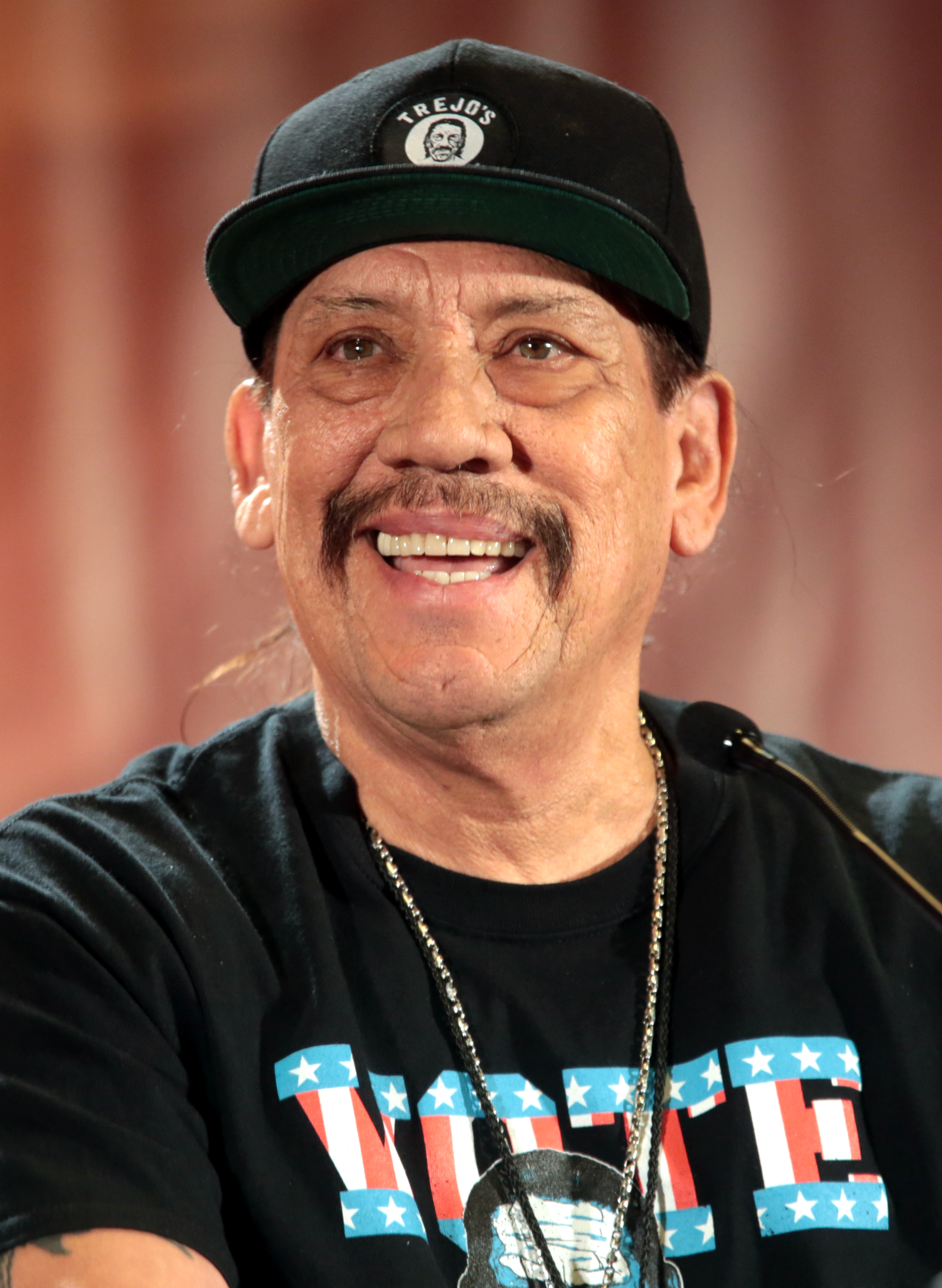
Trejo in 2017

Danny Trejo is an American actor. His filmography consists of about 250 film and television roles. His prominence in the B movie scene has resulted in disparate media sources referring to Trejo as an "iconic actor" and a "film legend", among other titles.

Trejo's film career began in 1985, when he "accidentally" landed a role in Runaway Train, playing a boxer for a daily fee of $320. Prior to that, Trejo had served time in prison on multiple occasions and worked as a drug counsellor after his release. Trejo credits the first film in which he was given a proper credited role as Art Sanella in Death Wish 4: The Crackdown. He went on to star in a multitude of other films, including Desperado, From Dusk till Dawn, Con Air, Reindeer Games, and Grindhouse, among others.

From 2001 to 2003, Trejo appeared in the Robert Rodriguez-directed Spy Kids franchise as Isador "Machete" Cortez, in the films Spy Kids, Spy Kids 2: The Island of Lost Dreams and Spy Kids 3-D: Game Over. He also voiced Uncle Machete in the video game Spy Kids: Mega Mission Zone. In 2007, Trejo reprised his role in a fictional trailer in Grindhouse, also directed by Rodriguez; subsequently, in 2010, Trejo reprised his role as Machete in a spin-off exploitation film of the same name as the protagonist, also directed by Rodriguez. The character is cited as his "first major film role". Subsequently, Trejo reprised his role as Machete in Spy Kids: All the Time in the World, with the success of Machete also resulting in a direct sequel, Machete Kills, with Trejo once again reprising his role. Trejo has been cast in many television programmes, including Baywatch, where he portrayed different characters for different episodes. Outside of film and television appearances, Trejo has also been featured in a handful of music videos, including the video for Dustin Tavella's "Everybody Knows (Douchebag)". He voiced the characters Umberto Robina for the video games Grand Theft Auto: Vice City and Grand Theft Auto: Vice City Stories, himself in Def Jam: Fight for NY (2004), Raul Tejada in Fallout: New Vegas, Trainer Duke in The Fight: Lights Out, himself in Call of Duty: Black Ops and Call of The Dead and Call of Duty Black Ops 4: Blackout and also himself in Far Cry 6: Danny and Dani vs. Everybody, and SCUM, among others.

== Film ==
Year	Title	Role	Note(s)	Ref(s)
1983	Project A	Lo Sam Pau	Voice; English dub	
1985	Runaway Train	Boxer	Credited as Daniel Trejo; also uncredited boxing coach for Eric Roberts	
1987	Penitentiary III	See Veer		
1987	The Hidden	Prisoner		
1987	Death Wish 4: The Crackdown	Art Sanella		
1988	Bulletproof	Sharkey		
1989	Kinjite: Forbidden Subjects	Prison inmate		
1989	Lock Up	Chink's gang member		
1989	Cage	Costello's bodyguard	Uncredited	
1989	Bail Out	'Mean'	Direct-to-video	
1990	Maniac Cop 2	Prisoner		
1990	Marked for Death	Hector		
1990	Guns	'Tong'		
1991	Femme Fatale	Toshi		
1991	The Last Hour	'Spider'		
1991	Whore	Tattoo artist		
1991	Carnal Crimes	Chandra the ticket agent	Direct-to-video	
1991	Lonely Hearts	Angry client		
1991	By the Sword	—N/a	Assistant for Eric Roberts	
1992	Sex Crimes	Palmer		
1993	Doppelganger	'Hard Hat'		
1993	Blood In Blood Out	'Geronimo'		
1993	Sunset Grill	Young Mexican		
1993	Mi Vida Loca	Frank		
1994	Angel of Desire	Construction worker		
1994	Victor One	Sergeant Aguilar		
1995	The Stranger	Hawk	Direct-to-video	
1995	Dead Badge	El Tango bartender		
1995	Desperado	Navajas		
1995	Heat	Trejo		
1996	From Dusk till Dawn	'Razor Charlie'		
1996	Le Jaguar	Kumare		
1997	Anaconda	Poacher		
1997	Champions	Max Brito	Direct-to-video	
1997	Con Air	John 'Johnny 23' Baca		
1997	Full Tilt Boogie	Himself	Documentary	
1997	Trojan War	'Scarface'		
1997	Los Locos	Manuel Batista		
1997	Dilemma	Rudy Salazar		
1997	Sepultura: We Are What We Are	Boxer	Documentary short	
1998	The Replacement Killers	Collins		
1998	Point Blank	Wallace	Direct-to-video	
1998	Six Days, Seven Nights	Pierce		
1998	Soundman	Duce's father		
1998	An Eye for Talent	Fred	Short film	
1999	From Dusk Till Dawn 2: Texas Blood Money	'Razor Eddie'	Direct-to-video	
1999	Inferno	'Johnny 6 Toes'		
1999	Whiteboyz	Prisoner	Uncredited	
1999	From Dusk Till Dawn 3: The Hangman's Daughter	'Razor Charlie'	Direct-to-video	
1999	Six Shots of Tequila			
2000	Animal Factory	Vito	Also co-producer	
2000	Reindeer Games	'Jumpy'		
2000	Settled Account	Hijacker #1	Credited as Daniel Trejo	
2001	Skippy	Hitman		
2001	Spy Kids	Isador "Machete" Cortez		
2001	Bubble Boy	'Slim'		
2002	Simpilicity	Barber	Short film	
2002	13 Moons	Hoodlum #2		
2002	The Salton Sea	Bill 'Little Bill'		
2002	Do It for Uncle Manny	Pedro		
2002	Spy Kids 2: The Island of Lost Dreams	Isador "Machete" Cortez	Cameo	
2002	XXX	'El Jefe'		
2002	Beat the Devil	Bob	Short film	
2002	Nightstalker	Officer Frank Luis	Also co-producer	
2002	Hiding in Walls	Jose	Short film	
2003	Film is Dead: An Evening with Robert Rodriguez	Himself	Documentary short	
2003	The Big Empty	Lt. Gates	Uncredited	
2003	Spy Kids 3-D: Game Over	Isador "Machete" Cortez	Cameo	
2003	Once Upon a Time in Mexico	'El Cucuy'		
2003	Double Blade	'El Patrón'		
2004	Anchorman: The Legend of Ron Burgundy	Bartender	Cameo	
2004	Turned Out: Sexual Assault Behind Bars	Himself	Documentary	
2004	Lost	Edward James Archer		
2004	51:50	Himself	Host; short film	
2004	Wake Up, Ron Burgundy: The Lost Movie	Bartender	Direct-to-video	
2005	All Souls Day	Vargas Díaz		
2005	Tennis, Anyone...?	Héctor		
2005	The Curse of El Charro	'El Charro'	Voice; direct-to-video	
2005	Champions	Himself	Documentary	
2005	The Crow: Wicked Prayer	Padre Harold		
2005	The Devil's Rejects	Rondo		
2005	Chasing Ghosts	Carlos Santiago		
2005	Dreaming on Christmas	Train Driver		
2006	Propensity	Roy	Also co-producer	
2006	Sherrybaby	Dean Walker		
2006	Seven Mummies	Apache		
2006	High Hopes	'Shady'		
2006	Living the Dream	Chuck		
2006	Venice Underground	Papi		
2006	Danny Roane: First Time Director	Héctor		
2006	Hood of Horror	Derelict		
2006	Taphephobia	Creek		
2007	Smiley Face	Albert		
2007	National Lampoon's TV: The Movie	Crow		
2007	Grindhouse	Isador "Machete" Cortez	Short film; segment: Machete	
2007	Richard III	Major		
2007	Delta Farce	Carlos Santana		
2007	Halloween	Ismael Cruz		
2007	The Blue Rose	Junk		
2007	Battle for Terra	Elder Barum	Voice	
2007	Urban Justice	'El Chivo'	Direct-to-video	
2007	Heckler	Himself	Documentary	
2007	On Bloody Sunday	The Ref		
2007	Furnace	'Fury'		
2008	Valley of Angels	Hector		
2008	D.O.P.E. (Death or Prison Eventually)	Narrator	Voice; documentary	
2008	Through the Valley	Don Reyes		
2008	The Art of Travel	Limo driver		
2008	Jake's Corner	Clint		
2008	Ranchero	Capone		
2008	I Am Somebody: No Chance in Hell	Manolo		
2008	Toxic	Antoine	Direct-to-video	
2008	El Superstar: The Unlikely Rise of Juan Frances	E.J.		
2008	Alone in the Dark II	Perry	Direct-to-video	
2008	Necessary Evil	Barro		
2009	Fanboys	The Chief		
2009	The Grind	Nicholi Guzman		
2009	Victory to the Underdog	Himself	Documentary	
2009	Official Rejection	Himself	Documentary	
2009	Cowboy Dreams	Lobo	Short film	
2009	The Boys of Ghost Town	Father Xavier		
2009	Eyeborgs	'G-Man'		
2009	The Line	Mario		
2009	Modus Operandi	Director Holiday	Also producer	
2009	Saint John of Las Vegas	Bismarck		
2009	Love Cures Cancer: Take a Chance on Love	Himself	Documentary	
2009	The Haunted World of El Superbeasto	Rico	Voice	
2009	Lunar Effect	Esteban		
2009	Babysitters Beware	The Guard		
2009	3V Man	Captain Podrido	Short film	
2009	We Gotta Get Buscemi	Himself	Documentary	
2010	Six Days in Paradise	Reuben Skinner		
2010	The Killing Jar	Jimmy		
2010	Shoot the Hero!	Joe 'Crazy Joe'		
2010	Justin Time	Mardok	Direct-to-video	
2010	Food Stamps	Mr. Fernández		
2010	Boston Girls	Uncle Reggie		
2010	Shadows in Paradise	Matador		
2010	Pastor Shepherd	Phil Harrison	Also executive producer	
2010	Project x27	'Mondo'		
2010	Gun	Frankie Makina		
2010	Predators	'Cuchillo'		
2010	Beatdown	Marcus		
2010	Machete	Isador "Machete" Cortez		
2010	The Bill Collector	Uncle Frankie		
2010	Death Race 2	Goldberg	Direct-to-video	
2011	Recoil	Drayke Salgado	Direct-to-video	
2011	Cross	Ripper	Direct-to-video	
2011	Blacktino	Rogelio		
2011	The Actor's Journey for Kids	Himself	Documentary	
2011	Love Cures Cancer: Take a Chance on Love II	Himself	Documentary	
2011	The Lazarus Papers	Aroon	Direct-to-video	
2011	American Flyer	Uncle John		
2011	Dark Games	Archie		
2011	House of the Rising Sun	Carlos Marcella		
2011	Poolboy: Drowning Out the Fury	Caesar		
2011	Onions Don't Make Me Cry	Himself	Short film	
2011	Spy Kids: All the Time in the World	Isador "Machete" Cortez	Cameo	
2011	Violet & Daisy	Russ		
2011	A Very Harold & Kumar 3D Christmas	Mr. Pérez		
2011	In the Shadow	Hermit		
2012	Breaking Wind	Billy Black		
2012	Bad Ass	Frank		
2012	Sushi Girl	Schmo		
2012	Mango Bajito	Carson		
2012	Bro'	Gilbert		
2013	Counterpunch	Manny Navarro		
2013	Death Race 3: Inferno	Goldberg	Direct-to-video	
2013	Ticket to Vegas	Mr. Chich	Credited as Denni Trekho	
2013	Tattoo Nation	Himself	Documentary	
2013	The Insomniac	Jairo Torres		
2013	The Cloth	Father Connely		
2013	Amelia's 25th	Don Javier		
2013	20 Feet Below: The Darkness Descending	Angel		
2013	Zombie Hunter	Jesus	Direct-to-video	
2013	Five Thirteen	El Loco		
2013	The Contractor	Javier / Jorges Reyes	Direct-to-video	
2013	Top Cat: The Movie	Griswald	Voice; American dub	
2013	Chavez Cage of Glory	Mando		
2013	American Lowrider	The O.G.	Direct-to-video	
2013	Machete Kills	Isador "Machete" Cortez		
2013	Dead in Tombstone	Guerrero De La Cruz	Direct-to-video	
2013	Dream Date		Short film	
2013	Pendejo	Pedro		
2013	Courier from Paradise	Guide Leo		
2013	Force of Execution	Jimmy 'Peanuts' Oso	Direct-to-video	
2014	A Voodoo Possession	Kross		
2014	Bad Asses	Frank Vega	Direct-to-video	
2014	Bullet	Frank 'Bullet' Marasco	Direct-to-video	
2014	Muppets Most Wanted	Himself		
2014	In the Blood	'Big Biz'		
2014	Scooby-Doo! Ghastly Goals	Reynaldo	Voice; short film; direct-to-video	
2014	Throwdown	Tattoo	Direct-to-video	
2014	Vengeance	Jack Santos	Also producer	
2014	Preggoland	Pedro		
2014	The Book of Life	Skeleton Luis 'El Super Macho' Sanchez	Voice	
2014	Reaper	Jack		
2014	Strike One	Manny Garcia	Also producer	
2014	Reach Me	Vic		
2015	Pure Love	Uncle Freddy		
2015	Faith in the Big House	Himself	Documentary	
2015	Hope Lost	Marius		
2015	The Burning Dead	Night Wolf		
2015	Vanish	Carlos	Direct-to-video	
2015	Bad Asses on the Bayou	Frank Vega	Direct-to-video; also associate producer	
2015	The Night Crew	Aguilar		
2015	The Weight of Blood and Bones	Espada	Short film	
2015	East LA Interchange	Himself	Documentary	
2015	3-Headed Shark Attack	Max Burns	Direct-to-video	
2015	L.A. Slasher	The Drug Dealer #2		
2015	The Good, the Bad and the Dead	Mateo Perez		
2015	Sock 'Em Dead	Himself	Host; short film	
2015	No Way Out	Don Caceres		
2015	The Ridiculous 6	Cicero		
2015	Guiltless	Tony	Short film	
2016	Irwindale	Himself	Short film	
2016	Range 15	Zombie Trejo		
2016	Vigilante Diaries	Crazy Joe	Uncredited	
2016	Halloweed	Patch		
2016	A Horse Story	Moonlight	Voice	
2016	Beyond the Game	Jose		
2016	Bridesman	Eduardo	Short film	
2016	Cyborg X	Captain Machine Gun		
2016	Rock Bottom and Back	Himself	Documentary short	
2016	North by El Norte	Uncle John		
2016	Mostly Ghostly: One Night in Doom House	Mr. Morgo	Direct-to-video	
2016	Dodge, PsychoBandits	Dodge Salesman	Short film	
2016	Storks	Jasper	Voice	
2016	Street Level	Carlton the Doorman		
2017	Cross Wars	'Muerte'	Direct-to-video	
2017	Juarez 2045	Paco		
2017	Boost	Roy Casares		
2017	All About the Money	Luis Diego		
2017	Pop Culture	Himself	Documentary	
2017	Puss in Book: Trapped in an Epic Tale	El Moco	Voice; short film	
2017	Good Fortune	Himself	Documentary	
2017	Not a War Story	Himself	Documentary	
2017	Death House	Murderer	Uncredited	
2017	Dead Again in Tombstone	Guerrero De La Cruz	Direct-to-video	
2017	McDick	Oscar		
2017	Calico Queens	Bill Gallows	Short film	
2017	Murder in the Woods	Sheriff Lorenzo		
2017	Maximum Impact	Don Sanchez		
2017	BorderCross	Paco		
2017	Avenge the Crows	Antonio		
2018	Survivor's Guide to Prison	Himself	Documentary	
2018	Gone Are the Days	River Man		
2018	Fury of the Fist and the Golden Fleece	Nino Grande		
2018	Bully	Manny		
2018	Frat Pack	'Dirty'		
2018	Hollywood, I'm Sorry	Himself	Documentary	
2018	Silencer	Ocha		
2018	Woman	Father	Short film	
2018	Death Race: Beyond Anarchy	Goldberg	Direct-to-video	
2018	Mutafukaz	Bruce Macchabée	Voice; English dub	
2018	American Nightmares	Mr. Malevolent		
2018	Roxy	Principal Castillo		
2018	The Lost Day	Jackhammer	Direct-to-video	
2019	Wish Man	Jose		
2019	Slasher Party	Smiley Face		
2019	Grand-Daddy Day Care	Eduardo Hernandez	Direct-to-video	
2019	Nice Girls Don't Stay for Breakfast	Himself	Documentary	
2019	The Short History of the Long Road	Miguel		
2019	Every 9 Hours	Raul	Short film	
2019	The Outsider	Carlos		
2019	The Margarita Man	Dr. Valenzula		
2019	Madness in the Method	Himself		
2019	Dora and the Lost City of Gold	Boots	Voice	
2019	Bullets of Justice	Grave-digger		
2019	3 from Hell	Rondo		
2019	Inmate #1: The Rise of Danny Trejo	Himself	Documentary; also executive producer	
2019	Bare Knuckle Brawler	Santo Ariza		
2019	Big Kill	General Morales		
2019	Black Licorice	Donicio		
2019	Slayer: The Repentless Killogy	Danny		
2019	Acceleration	Santos		
2019	Cross: Rise of the Villains	'Muerte'	Direct-to-video	
2019	Smoke & Mirrors: The Story of Tom Savini	Himself	Documentary	
2020	The Fixer	Benito 'Benny' Sanchez	Short film	
2020	Final Kill	Francesco		
2020	LA Originals	Himself	Documentary	
2020	Ultimate Fighter	Himself		
2020	The SpongeBob Movie: Sponge on the Run	'El Diablo'		
2020	Cover Me	Big Mike		
2020	Pistolera	Indio		
2020	American Pie Presents: Girls' Rules	Mr. Steve Garcia, The Janitor	Direct-to-video	
2020	The Last Exorcist	Marco		
2020	Lumpia with a Vengeance	Reyes		
2020	OYLS (For Your Consideration)	The Everyman	Short film	
2020	Remnants of the Fallen	Oddvar Folsom		
2021	Donny's Bar Mitzvah	Himself		
2021	Green Ghost and the Masters of the Stone	Master Gin		
2021	The House Next Door: Meet the Blacks 2	Hugo		
2021	Welcome to Our World	Mr. Fernandez		
2021	The Rebels of PT-218	Seaman Edgar 'Cookie' Crozco		
2021	Shadow of the Cat	Gato		
2021	Death Rider in the House of Vampires	Bela Latigo		
2021	Pups Alone	Vinnie P.	Voice	
2021	American Sicario	Pedro		
2022	Fire-Man's Fetish	Fire-Man	Short film	
2022	A Pray for Judas	Carnizzari		
2022	Vampfather	Vampfather		
2022	The Legend of La Llorona	Jorge		
2022	The Prey: Legend of Karnoctus	Vega		
2022	A Tale of Two Guns	Junior		
2022	Good Mourning	Method Cameo	Cameo	
2022	Minions: The Rise of Gru	'Stronghold'	Voice	
2022	Caroltyn	Wells		
2022	Smile or Hug	Dr. Garcia		
2022	Clerks III	Auditioner	Cameo	
2022	Renegades	Sanchez		
2022	From a Son	George		
2022	The Street Avenger	'Muerte'		
2023	1521	Ferdinand Magellan		
2023	The Legend of Johnny Jones	'Muerte'		
2023	Detour 95	'Muerte'		
2023	Miami Bici 2	Mr. Susan		
2023	The Curse of Wolf Mountain	Eddie		
2023	Death on the Border	Father Francis		
2024	The Night They Came Home	Digger	Direct-to-video	
2024	Tim Travers and the Time Traveler's Paradox	Royce		
2024	Seven Cemeteries	Santana Bravo		
2025	The Wrecker			
2025	Zootopia 2	Jesús	Voice	
TBA	Pawn Shop			

== Television ==
Year	Title	Role	Note(s)	Ref(s)
1989	Shannon's Deal	Raul Galindez	Television film	
1990	Drug Wars: The Camarena Story	Gabriel	Miniseries; 3 episodes	
1991	Doublecrossed	Lito	Television film	
1991	Wedlock	Tough prisoner #1	Television film	
1991–1992	Baywatch	Carlos Urueta / 'Chulo'	2 episodes	
1992	Jake and the Fatman	Mumbling prisoner	Episode: "Last Dance"	
1992	Reasonable Doubts	Cholo #2	2 episodes	
1992	Nails	Las Virgenes bartender	Television film	
1993	12:01	Prisoner	Television film	
1993	Last Light	2nd inmate	Television film	
1993	Love, Cheat & Steal	Cuban	Television film	
1993	Joe Bob's Drive-In Theater	Tong	Archive footage; episode: "Femme Fatale Month: Part 4"	
1994	Against the Wall	Luis	Television film	
1995	Vanishing Son	Out-of-breath man	Episode: "Dance of the Dust"	
1995	Fallen Angels	Boxer	Episode: "Love and Blood"	
1996	Renegade	Freddie	Episode: "Hog Calls"	
1996	Nash Bridges	Sid Benedict	Episode: "Internal Affairs"	
1996–1998	NYPD Blue	Gabriel Mota / Frankie Soto	2 episodes	
1998	Tracey Takes On...	Hispanic Man / Pool Player	2 episodes	
1998	Brooklyn South	Louis (Hertz's bodyguard)	Episode: "Skel in a Cell"	
1998–1999	Walker, Texas Ranger	Joe Lopez / José Rodriguez	2 episodes	
1999	No Mothers Crying, No Babies Dying		Television film	
2000	The X-Files	Cesar Ocampo	Episode: "Redrum"	
2001–2010, 2026–present	King of the Hill	Enrique / Victor Velasquez / Lifeguard / Waiter	Voice; 20 episodes	
2002	The District	Himself	Episode: "Convictions"	
2003	Kingpin	Manny	Episode: "El Velorio"	
2003	Alias	Emilio Vargas	Episode: "Countdown"	
2003	The Brothers García	Eduardo 'Ed' García	Episode: "It Was Fun While It Lasted"	
2004	Grounded for Life	Raúl	Episode: "(She's Got) Kegs"	
2004	Monk	'Spyder' Rudner	Episode: "Mr. Monk Goes to Jail"	
2005	George Lopez	Bobby	Episode: "George's Extreme Makeover: Holmes Edition"	
2005	Desperate Housewives	Héctor Ramos	Episode: "The Sun Won't Set"	
2006	Heist	Ernesto	2 episodes	
2006	Slayer	Montegna	Television film	
2006	Death Row	Priest	Television film	
2007	The Knights of Prosperity	Hector	Episode: "Operation: Open the Safe"	
2007	Stargate Atlantis	Omal	Episode: "Missing"	
2007	Blood Ties	Pacha Kamaq	Episode: "Wrapped"	
2007	Greatest Ever Disaster Movies	Himself	Television special	
2008	The Young and the Restless	Bartender	15 episodes	
2008	El Tigre: The Adventures of Manny Rivera	"El Mal Verde"	Voice; episode: "No Belts, No Boots, No Brero"	
2009	The Spectacular Spider-Man	Ox	Voice; episode: "Probable Cause"	
2009	Pit Bulls & Parolees	Himself	Episode: "Blackout"	
2009–2010	Breaking Bad	Tortuga	2 episodes	
2010	Burn Notice	Vega	Episode: "Friendly Fire"	
2010	Tim and Eric Awesome Show, Great Job!	Suspect	Episode: "Comedy"	
2010	The Good Guys	Alfredo	Episode: "Little Things"	
2010	Modern Family	Gus	Episode: "Dance Dance Revelation"	
2011–2019	Young Justice	Bane	Voice; 2 episodes	
2011	Bones	Bishop	Episode: "The Finder"	
2011	The Cleveland Show	Himself	Voice; episode: "Hot Cocoa Bang Bang"	
2011	Franklin & Bash	Último	Episode: "Go Tell It on the Mountain"	
2011	St. James Presents: Delirium Cinema	Tijuanna Maxx	Television film	
2011–2012	Sons of Anarchy	Romero 'Romeo' Parada	14 episodes	
2012, 2014	The High Fructose Adventures of Annoying Orange	Cupcake Leader / El Dente	Voice; 2 episodes	
2012	Dr. Fubalous	Tyrannosaurus Death	4 episodes	
2012	Ghostquake	Ortiz	Television film	
2012	Rise of the Zombies	Caspian	Television film	
2013	Maron	Manny	Episode: "Sponsor"	
2013	Phineas and Ferb: Mission Marvel	Venom	Voice	
2013	ETC: Machinima	Future Khail	Episode: "Machete Wants Your GTA 5"	
2013	Circus Halligalli	Himself	Episode: "Ohr du Frohliche/Machete vs. Violetta/Pointen-Raten/Der 2.000 Gag"	
2014	NCIS: Los Angeles	Tuhon	Episode: "Tuhon"	
2014	Saint George	Tio	10 episodes	
2014	Habla Men	Himself	Documentary	
2014–2017	Teenage Mutant Ninja Turtles	Newtralizer	Voice; 3 episodes	
2015–2018	The Adventures of Puss in Boots	El Moco	Voice; 11 episodes	
2015	China, IL	Pony's father	Voice; episode: "Parent's Day"	
2015	From Dusk till Dawn: The Series	The Regulator	7 episodes	
2015	Mavericks	Himself	Host	
2015	Mickey Mouse	Piñata Boss	Voice; episode: "Feliz Cumpleanos!"	
2015	Pig Goat Banana Cricket	Filthy the Foot	Voice; episode: "Happy Chalawunga!"	
2016	Angie Tribeca	Himself	Episode: "Inside Man"	
2016	Snaketacular	Himself	Host; television special	
2016	Map of Hell	Himself	Host; documentary	
2016	TripTank	Bartender / Gambler / Caller	Voice; 2 episodes	
2016	Stars Selling Cars	Himself	Episode: "Danny Trejo"	
2016	Man at Arms: Reforged	Himself	Guest host; 2 episodes	
2016	Rudy	Uncle Lester	Voice; television film	
2016–2021	Home & Family	Himself	4 episodes	
2016–2021	Suelta La Sopa	Himself	2 episodes	
2017	What Would Trejo Do?	Danny		
2017	Rick and Morty	Mr. Jaguar	Voice; episode: "Pickle Rick"	
2017	Explosion Jones	The Specialist	Voice	
2017	Real Rob	Danny	Episode: "Zen What Happens"	
2017	Brooklyn Nine-Nine	Oscar Diaz	Episode: "Game Night"	
2017	Hooked	Jesus	Television film	
2017–2023	Hell's Kitchen	Himself	2 episodes	
2017–2019	Rapunzel's Tangled Adventure	Wreck Marauder / Malice Marauder	Voice; 2 episodes	
2017–2019	American Dad!	Mexican Thugs	Voice; 2 episodes	
2017–2019	The Flash	Josh / Breacher	3 episodes	
2017–2018	Man at Arms: Art of War	Himself	Host; 18 episodes	
2017–2020	Elena of Avalor	Antonio Agama	Voice; 3 episodes	
2018–present	Big City Greens	Vasquez	Voice; recurring role	
2018	Kidding	Himself	Episode: "Green Means Go"	
2018	Blue Bloods	Jose Rojas	Episode: "Common Enemies"	
2018	What We Do in the Shadows	Danny	Episode: "The Trial"	
2018	3Below: Tales of Arcadia	Tronos Madu	Voice; 6 episodes	
2018	We're Alive: Goldrush	Danny Blackburn	Episode: "On the Road Again"	
2018	Seis Manos	"El Balde"	Voice; 8 episodes	
2018	Family Guy	Clint Beltran	Voice; episode: "Shanksgiving"	
2020–2022	Victor and Valentino	Paco / Cupcake Man / additional voices	Voice; 5 episodes	
2020	New Looney Tunes	Lieutenant	Voice; episode: "Dorlock Vice"	
2020	Top Chef	Himself	Guest judge; episode: "Pitch Perfect"	
2020	Dynasty	Himself	Episode: "Robin Hood Rescues"	
2020	Reno 911!	Assassin	Episode: "Lil'Primo"	
2020	Danny's Diary	Himself	3 episodes	
2020	Lead with Love	Himself	Television special	
2020	Muppets Now	Himself	Episode: "Fever Pitch"	
2020	L.A.'s Finest	Reuben Velazquez	Episode: "The Curse of the Black Pearl"; uncredited	
2020	Helpsters	Cookie Cornelius	Episode: "Cookie Cornelius"	
2020	The Conners	Tito	Episode: "Keep on Truckin' Six Feet Apart"	
2020	Paragon: The Shadow Wars	Kincaid	6 episodes	
2021	American Gods	Mr. World	2 episodes	
2021	The Masked Singer	Himself / Raccoon	Contestant (season 5); 3 episodes	
2021	My American Family	Ricardo De La Rossa	1 episode	
2021	Fast & Furious Spy Racers	Tuco	Voice; recurring role	
2021	The Casagrandes	Danny	Voice; episode: "Battle of the Grandpas"	
2021	American Horror Stories	Santa Claus	Episode: "The Naughty List"	
2021	Muppets Haunted Mansion	The Ghost of Huet	Voice; television special	
2021	The Next Thing You Eat	Himself	Episode: "Breakfast: An Illusion of Choice"	
2021	Running Wild with Bear Grylls	Himself	Episode: "Danny Trejo in the Moab Desert"	
2021	Maya and the Three	Little Boy / Cabrakan	Voice; 3 episodes	
2021	Masters of the Universe	Ram-Man	Voice; episode: "Comes with Everything You See Here" (in Revelation)	
2021	The Black Hole		Voice; pilot	
2022	The Book of Boba Fett	Rancor Keeper	Episode: "Chapter 3: The Streets of Mos Espa"	
2022	PBC	Ricky	5 episodes	
2022	Better Things	Himself	3 episodes	
2022	Iron Chef: Quest for an Iron Legend	Himself	Guest judge; episode: "Battle Tailgate"	
2022–2023	The Ghost and Molly McGee	Bobby Daniels	Voice; 3 episodes	
2023	RuPaul's Drag Race	Big Daddy	Season 15; episode: "The Daytona Wind 2"	
2023	RuPaul's Drag Race: Untucked	Himself	Episode: "Untucked - The Daytona Wind 2"	
2023	Lopez vs Lopez	Danny Martinez	Episode: "Lopez vs Bucket Crabs"	
2023	The Patrick Star Show	Sockeye Sammy	Voice; episode: "Patrick's Prison Pals"	
2023	Beyond Belief: Fact or Fiction	Sheriff	Episode: "Die blutige Spur"	
2024–2025	Hot Wheels Let's Race	Striker Spoiler	Voice; 3 episodes	
2024	Mr. Birchum	Switchblade	Voice; episode: "Oh, the Humanity"	
2024	Bar Rescue	Himself	Guest host; 3 episodes	
2024	Tales of the Teenage Mutant Ninja Turtles	Mustang Sally	Voice	
2024	Monsters at Work	Terry	Voice; episode: "The C.R.E.E.P. Show"	
2024	Futurama	Doblando	Voice; episode: "The One Amigo"	
2025	Chibiverse	Vasquez	Voice; episode: "Journey to the Center of the Chibiverse"	
2025	Krapopolis	Chief Ravdi	Voice; episode: "The Weather Stick"	

== Video games ==
Year	Title	Voice role	Note(s)	Ref(s)
1993	Ground Zero: Texas	'Shotgun'		
2002	Spy Kids: Mega Mission Zone	Isador "Machete" Cortez		
2002	Grand Theft Auto: Vice City	Umberto Robina		
2004	Def Jam: Fight for NY	Himself		
2006	Def Jam Fight for NY: The Takeover	Himself		
2006	Grand Theft Auto: Vice City Stories	Umberto Robina		
2010	Fallout: New Vegas	Raul Alfonso Tejada	Credited as Danny 'Machete' Trejo	
2010	The Fight: Lights Out	Duke		
2010	Call of Duty: Black Ops	Himself	Escalation and the 2011 DLC expansion Call of the Dead.	
2012	Danny Trejo's Vengeance: Woz with a Coz	Himself	Host	
2014	Teenage Mutant Ninja Turtles: Danger of the Ooze	Newtralizer		
2017	Taco Run!	Himself		
2018	Guns of Boom	Himself		
2019	Call of Duty: Black Ops 4	Himself	Blackout Mode DLC character	
2021	Far Cry 6	Himself	Danny and Dani vs Everybody DLC	
2021	Grand Theft Auto: The Trilogy - The Definitive Edition	Umberto Robina	Archival recordings; remaster of Grand Theft Auto: Vice City only	
2022	OlliOlli World	Himself		
2022	Scum	Himself	SCUM: Danny Trejo Character Pack DLC	
2023	Crime Boss: Rockay City	'The Dragon'		
2024	Like a Dragon: Infinite Wealth	Dwight Méndez	Also likeness	

== Music videos ==
Year	Music video	Artist(s)
1995	"La Familia"	Kid Frost
1996	"Attitude"	Sepultura
1998	"Keep Hope Alive"	The Crystal Method
2002	"Isle of Dreams"	Alexa PenaVega
2003	"Double Blade"	Jay Chou
2004	"Got It Twisted"	Mobb Deep
2005	"Play for Real"	B-Real & DJ Lethal
2007	"Definition of an Ese"	Down AKA Kilo
2008	"Cracker Ass Fantastic"	Simon Rex
2008	"Bartender Song (Sittin' at a Bar)"	Rehab; with actor Larry Wilcox
2008	"Burnin' Up"	Jonas Brothers
2008	"Like Yeah"	Tech N9ne
2010	"Sebring"	Do It Live featuring Danny Trejo
2010	"Fantasy Girl"	Baby Bash featuring Marty James
2012	"Open Your Eyes"	Maylene and the Sons of Disaster
2012	"Whistle Dixie"	Travis Barker & Yelawolf
2012	"We Are the Party"	The Ex-Girlfriends
2013	"Everybody Knows"	Dustin Tavella
2013	"Loco"	Enrique Iglesias featuring Romeo Santos
2014	"Angel in Blue Jeans"	Train
2014	"The Kill"	Cal Scruby
2015	"Norma and Jessica"	SadGirl
2015	"Repentless"	Slayer
2016	"Money"	Broiler featuring Bekuh Boom
2016	"Pride in Prejudice"	Slayer
2017	"Walk on Water"	Thirty Seconds to Mars
2018	"The Arrow of Our Youth"	The Zephyr Bones
2018	"Suga Suga (Acoustic Version)"	Baby Bash featuring Frankie J
2018	"Flames"	David Guetta featuring Sia
2019	"Wreck the Rod"	Nick Waterhouse
2019	"Mama Don't Lie"	Tarah New
2019	"Mamacita"	Tyga, YG & Carlos Santana
2020	"Satisfy My Soul"	Tarah New featuring Baby Bash
2020	"Life is Beautiful"	Black Oxygen
2021	"Netflix (Your Product is Too Good)"	OYLS
2021	"Goodtime Girl"	Starcrawler; with actor David Hasselhoff
2021	"If You Don't Mind"	Cota featuring Trish Toledo
2021	"La Fama"	Rosalía featuring The Weeknd
2022	"Drama"	Tarah New
2023	"La Chamba"	Arcángel featuring Peso Pluma
2026	"Te Olvido (La La)"	Benny Blanco, Selena Gomez and Becky G

== Commercials ==
Year	Title	Role	Note(s)	Ref(s)
2009	This Guy	Himself	The commercial for the live broadcast of weekly National Football League (NFL) games on ESPN in the United States (US) which was entitled ESPN Monday Night Football. Parking garage scene only.	
2010	Machete: A Brisk Story by Danny Trejo	Himself	Voice over	
2011	The Black Mamba	Himself		
2011–2012	Old El Paso	Himself	Voice over	
2012	The Ad Council GED Pep Talk Center	Himself		
2013	Old El Paso's Smoky BBQ Fajitas	Himself	Voice over. This commercial is for the United Kingdom (UK) only.	
2013	Miller Lite	Himself	This commercial is for Spain only.	
2014	Old El Paso Taco Sauce	Himself	Voice over	
2015	Snickers: The Brady Bunch	Isador 'Machete' Cortez A.K.A Marcia Brady	The commercial to promote the NFL 2015 Super Bowl game which was entitled Super Bowl XLIX.	
2015	Alcatraz Prison Escape: Deathbed Confession	Narrator	Voice over	
2015	Bergener Mirejovsky	Himself		
2015	James Bergener: Los Abogados de Accidentes	Himself	Also known in English as Accident Lawyers. This commercial is for Spanish only.	
2015	The Lost Snickers Commercial Starring Danny Trejo	Himself / The Regulator	This new commercial was from the season 4 premiere of The Flash which premiered on October 6, 2015. Also, this commercial was to promote season 2 of From Dusk till Dawn: The Series on the defunct El Rey Network.	
2015	CS:GO "Cutthroat" feat. Danny Trejo	Himself	Short film	
2015–2016	Dodge	Himself	The Dodge commercials for Trejo are for Spain (Spanish) only.	
2016–2018	Sling TV	Himself	Various A La Carte and Get Picky commercials.	
2017	AARP: Tougher than Tough	Himself		
2018	Magic: The Gathering Arena: Open Beta Announce Trailer	Himself	Short film	
2019	SALITOS	Himself		
2020	Sweet James	Himself		
2020	Cri-Help	Himself		
2021	AT&T Wireless Active Armor: March Madness: Muscle	Himself	This commercial was to promote the 2021 NCAA March Madness basketball game.	
2021	Escape Your Roommates: MTG Arena on Mobile	Himself	Short film	
2021	Tostitos: 5 Ways to Cinco with Danny Trejo	Himself	The commercial to celebrate Cinco de Mayo.	
2021	Clorox Product Ad Campaign Starring Danny Trejo	Himself	The commercial for Clorox Turbo Disinfectant Cleaner.	
2021	Escape Room: Magic: The Gathering x Dungeons & Dragons	Himself	Short film	
2021	Try Not to Eat - Trejo's Tacos (ft. Danny Trejo!)	Himself	Short film	
2022	Planet Fitness - What's Gotten into Lindsay?	Himself	With Lindsay Lohan and William Shatner. This commercial was to promote the NFL 2022 Super Bowl game which was entitled Super Bowl LVI.	

== Podcasts ==
Year	Title	Role	Note(s)	Ref(s)
2010	Without Your Head	Himself	Guest; episode: "Danny Trejo"	
2019	Hotboxin' with Mike Tyson	Himself	Guest; episode: "Danny Trejo"	
2021	WTF with Marc Maron	Himself	Guest; episode: "Danny Trejo"	
2021	The Steve-O Wild Ride! Show	Himself	Guest; episode: "Danny Trejo"	
2021	The Adam Carolla Show	Himself	Guest; episode: "Danny Trejo + Donal Logue"	
2021	Modern Wisdom	Himself	Guest; episode: "The Most Killed Man in Hollywood"	
2024	Inside of You with Michael Rosenbaum	Himself	Guest; episode: "Danny Trejo"	

== Soundtrack ==
- Delta Farce (2007) (performer: "I Will Survive")
- Muppets Most Wanted (2014) (performer: "End of the Road", "I Hope I Get It")
