= Masters of the Elements =

1997 educational video game

- Developer(s): IJsfontein Interactive Media
- Publisher(s): Bombilla (Dutch); Van In (Belgium); VNU Interactive; Tivola (English & German); Gallimard (French)
- Platform(s): Classic Mac OS; Windows
- Release: November 4, 1997
- Genre(s): Adventure
- Mode(s): Single-player

Masters of the Elements (Dutch: Meesters van Macht) is an educational adventure video game developed by IJsfontein Interactive Media, and published by Bombilla (Dutch), Van In (Belgium), VNU Interactive, Tivola (English & German), and Gallimard (French). The game was originally released in November, 1997 and ended up on Macintosh and Windows.

In the Anglosphere, it was published by Tivola, who had recently published other edutainment titles such as Physicus, Bioscopia, and Chemicus. Originally in Dutch, the game was later translated into English, German, Japanese, French and Italian. The game was voiced by Joost Prinsen and won a BAFTA Award in 1999 after its English-language release.

== Production ==
The game was created by Jan Willem Huisman, Hayo Wagenaar, and Sander Hassing. The three developers at IJsfontein knew each other from the InterAction Design department of the Utrecht School of the Arts, where they designed the concept of the game. Wagenaar made all of the drawings, Hassing served as programmer, and Huisman organised the operation. They came up with the name "IJsfontein" during the development of this game, which was their first project; while other development companies had English names they wanted to choose something Dutch-sounding. The game's sound designer came up with "Ice fountain" because ice is static while a fountain is dynamic.

While getting into large debt, the team was invited to the Cannes expo named Milia, where they set up a stall in a section for young talent. Interest from a Japanese publisher put them in a strong negotiating position with VNU Interactive; while it was standard for the publisher to get rights to the game, the developers refused. They felt the publisher was condescending from their comments that the world does not work the way they think it does.

Upon signing a contract with the Chinese, they discovered VNU still expected the company to lose the copyright due to not meeting a deadline. The team entered into a 'double or nothing' negotiation, whereby failing to complete the titled by 6 October, it would result in heavy royalty regulations. The team ultimately presented a beta version to children at an Amsterdam primary school, after suffering through a panic-stricken September. The game was playtested by children from the top three groups of primary school; the developers noted the potential for the game to be popular with girls due to them finding solutions in a process-wise way, as opposed to boys who will click the screen 10,000 times until something happens. By 2016, 40 people would work at IJsfontein.

=== Design ===
It was one of the first serious games ever to be developed. At the time, IJsfontein was the first Dutch studio to explicitly develop a game with an educational bend. The game attempts to bridge two opposing sides of the video gaming market by offering an experience that is both fun and educational.

== Plot and gameplay ==
In the Castle of Infinity, there are five masters that bring balance to the elements. When Master of Chance loses his cat, the balance of the elements is disturbed. It is up to the player to collect pages of the Garden of Chance story, which will then cause Master of Chance to reveal clues about the whereabouts of his cat.

The game is puzzle based, with themes ranging from the natural world to physics to science.

== Reception ==
Gameboomers felt the puzzles required more dexterity than thought. Feibel felt the game was difficult and beautifully illustrated. The essay Op de koffie bij de Meester van Wanhoop thought the game demonstrated the wondrous potential of merging art and play in the digital world.

The game won a BAFTA award and a La Fletche d'Or. The game was nominated for the Bafta for most instructive game for children, and for the most interactive game for children. The game was featured at the IFFR.

The game was also a commercial success, and become one of the best-selling pieces of Dutch CD-ROM software.
