= Tamatem Games =

Arabic-language Jordanian mobile game developer

Tamatem
- Type: Private
- Industry: Mobile games
- Founded: April 1, 2013; 13 years ago
- Founder: Hussam Hammo
- Headquarters: Amman, Jordan
- Number of locations: 3
- Area served: Global
- Key people: Hussam Hammo (CEO); Eyad AlBasheer (COO)
- Number of employees: ~152 (2026)
- Website: Official website; Tamaten Inc. on LinkedIn

Tamatem Games is a Jordanian mobile game developer and publisher founded by Hussam Hammo, based in Amman. The company has worked internationally with multiple collaborators to aid in localising games for the Arab world.

== History ==
=== Background ===
Tamatem Games was founded by Hussam Hammo in 2013 upon realising there were a lack of Arabic games available online in the Arabic-speaking world. Tamatem received its first acceleration opportunity from 500 Startups, a U.S. accelerator and incubator in Silicon Valley, California in April 2013.

Tamatem also took part in a three-month growth hacking program at WeWork where it signed its first publishing deal with Tapinator to localise and bring its games to the Middle Eastern and Northern African markets. In 2013, Tamatem led its first round of seed investments that gave it $350,000 from MENA Venture Investments and 500 Startups. Following its seed round, Tamatem also secured a second round of funds in 2015 that came in from Kuwaiti-based fund Arzan VC.

Milestones

Awad the Delivery King is a racing game produced in collaboration with Jordanian animation studio Kharabeesh and was published in 2014. It was downloaded over 1 million times in less than a year since its release. This helped the company hit its 6 million downloads mark.

By 2015, Tamatem had a 35-game portfolio running on both Android and iOS devices. It hit 40,000 downloads per day and received investments from both regional and international investors. A Dumb Question, one of Tamatem's games released in 2015, became the number 1 downloaded app in Saudi Arabia four days after its release.

In 2016, Tamatem had 16 million total downloads and 41 published games, half of which reached No.1 on the iOS App Store and Google Play Store. The portfolio of games had more than 2.1 million active users monthly and 350,000 active users daily. The company was experiencing a 40% month-over-month growth in downloads and revenue. By the end of 2017, Tamatem Games reached 40 million downloads for a total of 50 published games.

In 2018, Tamatem raised a Series A investment round of $2.5 million. The round was led by Wamda Capital with participation from Discovery Nusantara Capital, Raed Ventures, Vision Ventures, and Seed Equity Venture Partners. 2018 was also the year that Tamatem signed with Lithuanian-based mobile game developers Game Insight to publish and localise Airport City in the Arabic-speaking market.

In 2020, Tamatem continued its Series A investment round, raising another $3.5 million also led by Wamda Capital along with Modern Electronics Company and North Base Media. In the same year, Tamatem also partnered with Croatian video game developer Nanobit to publish and launch the mobile game Hollywood Story in the Arabic-speaking market. In 2020, Tamatem doubled in size and expanded from 35 to 70 employees in 6 months.

In 2021, PlayerUnknown's BattleGrounds creator Krafton led Tamatem's Series B investment round, closing at $11 million. The round—seeing participation from Venture Souq, Endeavor Catalyst, and other existing investors—brought Tamatem's total amount of funding to over $17 million since its inception.

In 2022, Tamatem announced a partnership with MSA Novo and its entrance and expansion into the Chinese mobile games market.

In 2023, Tamatem partnered with Tap Payments and ZEGOCLOUD to integrate mobile payments and voice chats into its mobile gaming platform.

Business Model

Tamatem's business model is based on a split-revenue partnership. Tamatem partners with game developers from around the world to publish their games in the Arab region. Revenue is split based on an agreement between Tamatem and the developer. Tamatem has published games in the Arab world from developers in the United States, Brazil, India, China, Indonesia, Bulgaria, and Croatia.

== List of games ==
Game	Year Published	Genre
4 Pics 1 Word (لعبة سؤال وأربع صور)	2013	Trivia
Tower Building (لعبة بناء البرج)	2013	Casual
Awad The Delivery King (لعبة ملك التوصيل)	2014	Racing
Sing To Me Songs & Tunes Game ( لعبة أغاني وألحان)	2014	Music
A Dumb Question (لعبة السؤال القوي)	2014	Trivia
The Mysterious Quiz Game (لعبة اللغز الخفي)	2014	Trivia
Moron Test (إختبار الغباء)	2015	Trivia
Moron Test 2 (إختبار الغباء ٢)	2015	Trivia
Moron Test 3 (إختبار الغباء ٣)	2015	Trivia
Moron Test 4 (إختبار الغباء ٤)	2015	Puzzle
Death Road (شارع الموت)	2015	Action
Who's Right? (مين الصح؟)	2015	Trivia
Thunder Bolt Car (السيارة الصاعقة)	2015	Action
The Little Dinasour (الديناصور الصغير)	2015	Casual
Chicken Town (تشيكن تاون)	2015	Casual
Shake the Metal (هز الحديد)	2015	Racing
Police Car Simulator (شرطة التدخل السريع)	2016	Racing
Pizza Zombie	2016	Action
Mystery of the Past (لغز الماضي)	2016	Adventure
Tank Trail (درب المدرعات)	2016	Racing
Mafia Boss (زعيم المافيا)	2016	Casual
A Dumb Question 2 (لعبة السؤال القوي) 2	2016	Trivia
Zombie Attack (هجوم الزومبي)	2016	Casual
Hidden Mystery 2 (اللغز الخفي)	2016	Puzzle
Step on it! (ادعس يا شنب)	2016	Racing
One by One (واحد واحد)	2016	Board
ParKing (ملك الاصطفاف)	2016	Racing
VIP Baloot	2016	Card
Downshift: Online Drifting (غيار عكسي)	2016	Racing
Dynasty Blades (صقور الأرض)	2017	MMORPG
Airport City	2018	Strategy
VIP Jalsat	2018	Card
Arab Shield (درع العرب)	2018	Strategy role-playing game
Rage of the Righteous (غضب الشجعان)	2018	Role Playing
Bandar's Farm (مزرعة بندر)	2019	Casual
Fashion Queen (ملكة الموضة)	2019	Role-playing game
Words Island (جزيرة الحروف)	2020	Casual
Girls' Secrets (أسرار البنات)	2020	Role-playing game
Food Truck Chef (أفضل شف)	2020	Simulation
Home Design Expert	2020	Simulation
Clash of Empire (تحدي الملوك)	2021	Strategy role-playing game

== Awards ==
Award	Year	Organisation
Best Game of the Year [in Saudi Arabia, Egypt and the United Arab Emirates]	2014	Apple
Emerging Entrepreneur of the Year Award	2017	Ernst & Young
Best SME Jordan	2017	Bank Al-Etihad
2nd Place at Startup Istanbul Scaleup Finals	2019	Startup Istanbul
Arabian Business Startup of the Year	2019	Arabian Business Startup Awards
Pocket Gamer Awards: Best Publisher Finalists	2020	Pocket Gamer
Best YouTube Channel	2021	Peacock Social Media Awards
100,000 Subscribers Milestone	2021	YouTube
Pocket Gamer Awards: Best Publisher Finalists	2022	Pocket Gamer
