= Paradise Island (disambiguation) =

Paradise Island is an island in The Bahamas.

Paradise Island may also refer to:

== Geography ==
- Paradise Island, Florida, one of three islands in Lake Tohopekaliga, Florida, USA
- Paradise Island, also known as Heaven Island, an island near Marmaris in Turkey
- Paradise Island, known locally as Lankanfinolhu, an island in the Kaafu Atoll in the Maldives
- Paradise Island, an island in the Palmyra Atoll, administered by USA
- Fraser Island, an island in Australia known locally as K'gari, translated as 'Paradise' in Butchulla

== Arts, entertainment, and media ==
- Paradise Island (album), an album by Lake
- Paradise Island (film), a 1930 American South Seas film directed by Bert Glennon
- Paradise Island (musical), a musical produced by Guy Lombardo and staged at the Nikon at Jones Beach Theater in 1961 and 1962
- Paradise Island (video game), a video game for mobile devices
- Themyscira (DC Comics), a fictional island nation in the DC Comics universe, formerly called Paradise Island

== Brands and enterprises ==
- Paradise Island Adventure Golf, British indoor leisure company
- Paradise Island Airlines, a defunct airline
- Paradise Island Resort, a resort on Lankanfinolhu, an island in the Kaafu Atoll in the Maldives
