= Geograficus =

2003 video game

- Release: October 2003
- Genre(s): Adventure, Educational

Geograficus is a 2003 educational adventure video game, developed by Ruske & Pühretmaier and published by Heureka-Klett (up until 2005) and BrainGame Publishing (from 2005 after acquiring H-K's edutainment catalogue). The game was originally released in Germany.

== History ==
The game, along with a video game in the Willy Werkel series entitled Willy Werkel baut Raumschiffe, were used at Pestalozzi-Fröbel-Haus in a 2005 program entitled "Expedition Earth" which encourages children to learn about geography through the interactive media.

== Gameplay ==
The gameplay is similar to that of video game Myst, in which players traverse through a series of static screens in a retro science-fiction setting. The game aims to teach players about the Earth's physical geography and history of the Earth.

The game has an internal interactive encyclopedia that contains scientific information and clues on how to complete the puzzles.

== Plot ==
The young protagonist Geo is tasked by the wise scientist Geograficus to locate the whereabouts of Balvin, a fire dragon who has gone missing.

== Critical reception ==
Adventure Archiv questioned the choice to set an educational game in a fantasy world with dragons and magic, noting that the logic and physics of such worlds conflict with that of the real world thereby offering a confused message to players. Angel Adventure thought the game was both captivating and beautiful, while Kinderuni Darmstadt described it as interesting and logical. Wissen.de gave the game a rating of 3/5 stars. Macwelt thought the game's graphics or control did not live up to contemporary adventure games such as Uru: Ages Beyond Myst (2003) or Broken Sword: The Sleeping Dragon (2003). Lizzy Net wrote that the game made good use of its educational content and made it palatable. In her article Computer games in geography lessons: Learning does not always mean memorizing and timpani, Christina Bulow concluded that the program would not make a good classroom companion due to the high time investment required and the inefficiency of its educational-content delivery.

The game was awarded the 2004 Comenius Seal of Quality, and the 2004 GIGA mouse award for best educational game.
