= Georg Johansson =

Georg Johansson may refer to:

- Georg Johansson (ice hockey)
- Georg Johansson (footballer)
- George Johansson, author of children's literature, chiefly Mulle Meck
