= Heureka-Klett =

Defunct German software company

Heureka Klett was a German software engineering company which has made several personal computer games of the sort called "edutainment". They are point-and-click puzzle-adventure games, heavily inspired by Myst for Windows and Mac. These were distributed by Tivola International to be localized for many markets.

On June 1, 2005, Heureka-Klett sold its edutainment software to BrainGame Publishing. The holdings and marketing rights of the 22 games in their back catalogue were transferred.

Seven games in the educational series collectively sold over 500,000 units and won numerous awards.

== Titles published ==
- Physikus, localized to Physicus for the English-speaking market, attempts to teach physics by exploring an island whose locks are opened by working machines that illustrate different principles of physics. There also exists Physicus HD and Physicus II.
- Bioskopia, localized to Bioscopia for the English-speaking market, attempts to teach biology similarly by having the player try to save a woman explorer who has been attacked by disease-carrying robots once used for experiments. The player must make and supply penicillin to cure her while unlocking hidden areas and exploring the facility.
- Opera Fatal, where the player has to search the notes for a blackmailed musician, and therefore has to solve an enormous number of puzzles in the opera building.
- Chemikus, localized to Chemicus for the English-speaking market, attempts to teach chemistry by exploring a land whose rooms are linked by an underground railway whose controls are in the form of the periodic table of the elements. The player must set up and perform chemical reactions from substances and objects in his inventory. The plot is in the form of a trying to rescue a friend who has been captured by unseen enemies.
- Chemikus 2, the 5th Game of the series and the sequel of Chemikus 1, playing in a similar city, but under an advanced story.
- Mathica
- Informaticus (awarded Comenius Seal of Quality)
- Hystorion
- Geograficus
- Genius - Task Force Biologie
- Genius - Unternehmen Physik
- Mission: Amazonas (mission game)
- Mission: Schatztaucher (educational game)

Before turning to edutainment only, Heureka-Klett also published a school version of The Interactive Geometry Software Cinderella.
