= Black Oxygen =

American musical group

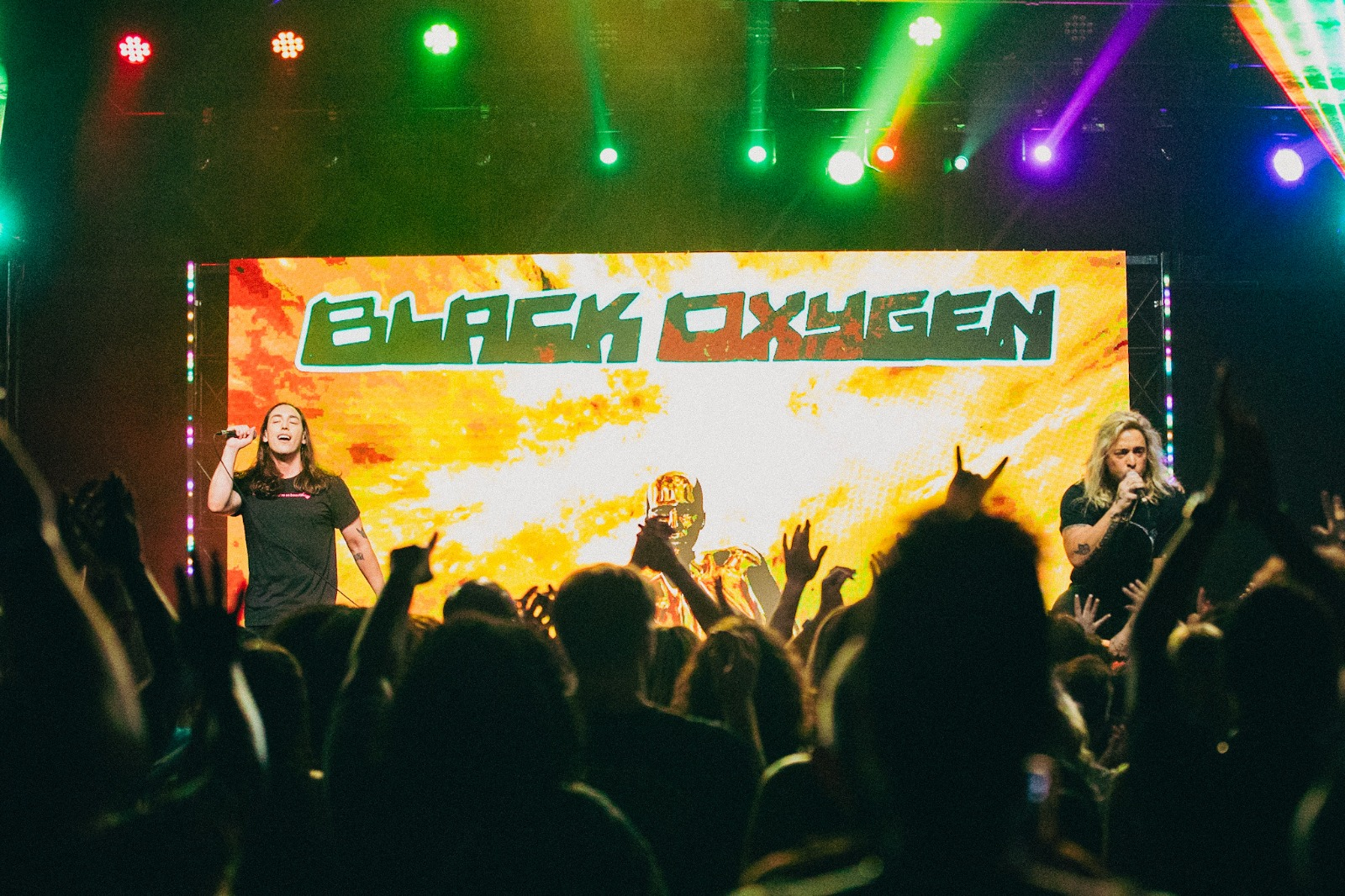
- Black Oxygen performing in 2024

Background information
- Origin: Kansas City, US
- Genres: Rock; pop
- Years active: 2010–present
- Labels: T2R; ADA; Warner
- Members: David Lyle; Nick Lyle
- Website: blackoxygenmusic.com

Black Oxygen is an American band formed in 2010 in Kansas City and currently based in Los Angeles, California. Consisting of brothers David and Nick Lyle, the duo has released five full-length studio albums and three EPs.

== History ==
Black Oxygen was formed in Kansas City by David Lyle (vocals, guitar) and his brother Nick (drums, keyboards) in 2010. They caught the attention of music industry specialists in Atlanta after winning first place in a battle of the bands. The same year, they were also spotted by rapper Kutt Calhoun, and together, they released the track "Pressure".

In 2012, Black Oxygen published their debut album, The American Dream. They followed it in 2014 with Beating Time. In 2016, they issued the single "Whole Thang", which featured Kutt Calhoun and Kstylis. In 2017, the band released the single "On That Vibe", featuring Navé Monjo.

Black Oxygen published the EP City of Angels in 2018, which included the Post Malone cover "Rockstar". In 2019, they came out with the single "Drop It", featuring Tech N9ne, as well as their third studio album, The Times of Our Lives.

In 2024, the duo collaborated with Shifty Shellshock of Crazy Town on the track "Butterfly (New Anthem)", a re-recording of the latter's 2000 hit "Butterfly". Later that year, Black Oxygen signed record deals with Warner Music and Twenty Two Recordings and issued the album Last Ones Standing, featuring the single "Hollywood Nights". The band also released a remix of the track featuring rapper Riff Raff. They additionally partnered with the Kansas restaurant chain Grinders to release a barbecue sauce. The band launched a clothing line in collaboration with Embroidery Studio LA, and they host a podcast titled The Inspiration Experience, which has featured celebrity guests such as Bam Margera, Danny Trejo, and Taryn Manning.

In 2026, the duo appeared as themselves in the action film Atlas King.

== Discography ==
Studio albums

- The American Dream (2012)
- Beating Time (2014)
- The Times of Our Lives (2019)
- New Heights (2023)
- Last Ones Standing (2024)

EPs

- City of Angels (2018)
- Right Now (2022)
- Hollywood Nights (Chopped Not Slopped) [Remix] (feat. OG Ron C & Riff Raff) (2025)

Singles

- "Pressure" (feat. Kutt Calhoun) (2011)
- "The American Dream" (2012)
- "Take It to the Limit" (2012)
- "Livin' the Life" (2014)
- "Madman" (feat. Irv Da Phenom) (2014)
- "Whole Thang" (feat. Kstylis & Kutt Calhoun) (2016)
- "A Step Away" (feat. Chantel Zales) (2017)
- "Speeding Bullet" (2017)
- "On That Vibe" (feat. Navé Monjo) (2017)
- "Rockstar" (2018)
- "Drop It" (feat. Tech N9ne) (2019)
- "Everything" (2019)
- "Burning Into the Night" (feat. Shifty Shellshock) (2019)
- "Life Is Beautiful" (2019)
- "Life Is Beautiful (Remix)" (feat. Krizz Kaliko) (2021)
- "Breathe the Smoke" (2021)
- "Laceyville" (2022)
- "New Heights" (2022)
- "Darkside" (feat. Joey Cool) (2022)
- "First Bite" (feat. Stretch) (2022)
- "Won't Stop" (2023)
- "Special World" (2023)
- "Apply Pressure" (2023)
- "Butterfly (New Anthem)" (feat. Crazy Town) (2024)
- "Hollywood Nights" (2024)
- "Options" (2024)
- "Hollywood Nights Remix" (feat. Riff Raff) (2024)
- "Rolling Stone" (2026)
