= House of Bodies =

- Directed by: Alex Merkin
- Written by: Eddie Harris
- Produced by: Otis Best; Yaneley Arty; Queen Latifah; David Eubanks; Ron Robinson; Shelby Stone
- Starring: Terrence Howard; Peter Fonda; George Katt; Alexz Johnson; Queen Latifah
- Cinematography: Lukasz Pruchnik
- Edited by: Rich Bradley; Alex Merkin
- Music by: Chad Hugo
- Production company: Vanguard Films
- Distributed by: Netflix
- Release date: April 19, 2013
- Running time: 75 minutes
- Country: United States

House of Bodies is a 2013 American horror film directed by Alex Merkin and written by Eddie Harris. It stars Terrence Howard, Peter Fonda, George Katt, Alexz Johnson and Queen Latifah. The film was released worldwide on Netflix on April 19, 2013.

== Plot ==
Detective Starks investigates mysterious murders very similar to those committed by the incarcerated serial killer Henry Lee Bishop. As Starks tries to crack through Bishop's creepy demeanor to get answers, a young deaf boy finds himself witness to a college girl fighting to stay alive on a voyeur house website—webcast from the very house where Bishop committed the murders years before.

== Cast ==
- Terrence Howard as Starks
- Peter Fonda as Henry Lee Bishop
- George Katt as Raylan Miller / Radar
- Alexz Johnson as Kelli
- Queen Latifah as Nicole
- Karlee Eldridge as Ambra
- Juliana Harkavy as Tisha
- Arturo Rossi as Detective Ramos
- Harry Zittel as Kyle

== Home media ==
The film was released on DVD on June 18, 2014.

== Reception ==
House of Bodies received mixed reviews from critics.

== See also ==
- List of horror films
