= Juarez 2045 =

- Directed by: Chris Le
- Story by: Chris Le
- Produced by: Rocky Mudaliar; Can Göksoy
- Starring: Danny Trejo; Alex Heartman
- Cinematography: Cammon Randle
- Production company: Abrupt Studios
- Release dates: April 1, 2017 (Sandy, Utah)
- Countries: United States, Canada
- Language: English

Juarez 2045 (also known as Cartel 2045) is a 2017 American science fiction action adventure film directed by Chris Le and produced by Rocky Mudaliar. It stars Danny Trejo, Brad Schmidt and Alex Heartman in lead roles. Juarez 2045 was released on April 1, 2017 in theaters in Sandy, Utah, near Salt Lake City. The film was later released on video on demand on May 1, 2018 under the title Cartel 2045.

== Plot synopsis ==
The story is set in the year 2045. The war on drugs in Mexico has escalated as a ruthless drug Cartel use robots to enforce their operations. A Marine goes to Juárez in search for his brother who was kidnapped by a lieutenant who leads the robotic Cartel.

== Cast ==
- Danny Trejo as Angel Malvado
- Brad Schmidt as Carson Wright
- Alex Heartman as Chris
- Blake Webb as Mickey
- Amy Savannah as Mila
- Flo Donelli as Carmen
- Nathan Day as Luke Hemsworth
- Mike Lopez as Drug Cartel Leader
- Casey William Walker as Technician #1
- Anthony Tefertiller as Juarez Driver
- Oscar Olivares as Gabriel Malvado
