= Physicus =

1999 educational adventure video game

- Developers: Ruske & Pühretmaier
- Publishers: Heureka-Klett, Tivola Publishing
- Platform: Windows
- Release: 1999
- Genres: Adventure, educational
- Mode: Single-player

Physicus: Save the World with Science! is a 1999 educational adventure video game developed by Ruske & Pühretmaier Edutainment and published by Heureka-Klett-Softwareverlag and Tivola Entertainment. It aims to teach players about physics concepts. It is part of a series that includes the chemistry-themed Chemicus and biology-themed sequel Bioscopia. It was the second learning adventure game by Ruske & Pühretmaier after the music-based Opera Fatal. The game's website had a minigame called "PHYSICO DriveIn" that players could download and complete in to get the highscore, which would win them a free copy of a game by the studio. A sequel entitled Physicus: The Return was later released, and was remade for the iOS.

== Gameplay ==
Gameplay is similar to Myst, in which players traverse through a series of computer generated static screens. Players can investigate physical locations, manipulate items, and complete puzzles to progress through the game.

The educational content covered four areas: Optics, Mechanics, Acoustics, and Electricity.

== Plot ==
When a meteorite collides with Earth, its planetary rotation ceases causing one hemisphere to be plunged into heat and the other into coldness. The player is tasked with using science to save the planet.

== Reception ==
Tap Repeatedly thought the game was made in the same vein as Myst, and complimented its "charming... lighthearted" design philosophy that effectively taught players in an engaging manner. Allgame noted that the game's use of the metric system and British accent of the narrator could act as barriers to North American players. Adventure Spiele wrote that the game would be able to teach some physics concepts to even the uninitiated. Quandaryland thought it would be a shame if the game's educational nature turned people off an experience as enjoyable as many non-educational titles. Adventure Gamers noted the game's potential application within schools.

=== Awards and nominations ===
- 1999 Padi seal of approval (6 mice rating)
- 2000 Comenius seal
