= Chemicus: Journey to the Other Side =

2001 educational video game

Chemicus
- Release: 2001

Chemicus: Journey to the Other Side is a 2001 educational adventure video game by Heureka-Klett as part of Tivola's "Quest for Knowledge" series. A sequel named Chemicus II: Die versunkene Stadt was released in 2002. The game was originally released in Germany.

== Gameplay ==
The first-person game has gameplay similar to Myst and Riven.

== Plot ==
The player is a friend of Richard, a chemistry lover who is falsely accused of stealing a treasured item from the land of Chemicus after he arrives there in a portal. It is the player's job to rescue him.

The game has no death states.

== Critical reception ==
Eblong likened the game's puzzle design to games such as Zork: Grand Inquisitor, Myst, and Traitors' Gate though noted that puzzles are completed by doing chemistry experiments rather than using spells, in-universe mythology or technological gizmos respectively. Metzomagic praised the game's graphics and musical score, and deemed it harder than its sister games Physicus and Bioscopia. Adventure Gamers thought the concept was admirable and was interested in playing the sequel.

Adventure Archiv thought the puzzles were fastidiously designed and that chemistry concepts were seamlessly integrated into the gameplay. Gameboomers gave the game very high praise and was excited to try the other two games in the series, and Mr. Bill's Adventure Land went away with a similar impression. Tap Repeatedly highly recommended the game as a chemistry learning tool for children.

Just Adventure noted that while there was an overarching goal, there was no plot-related logical reasoning given for the player to complete each individual puzzle, besides the fact that they can't progress to different areas until they do. Similarly, Adventure Gamers thought the game could have been served better by having a more interesting story that matched its intriguing world and puzzles. GameSpy offered a mixed review, but ultimately gave it a 1 star rating. Mystery Manor wrote that the addition of a narrator would have sharply improved the game.

AdventureTreff thought that Chemicus 2 worked well as a sequel, despite its limited budget.

=== Awards and nominations ===
- 2002 Comenius Medal (won)
- 2002 Giga Mouse - 6 mice (nominated)
- 2002 Padi Seal of Approval
- 2002 6 Buffalo at Edut@in-Preis
