= Nanobit =

Croatian video game developer

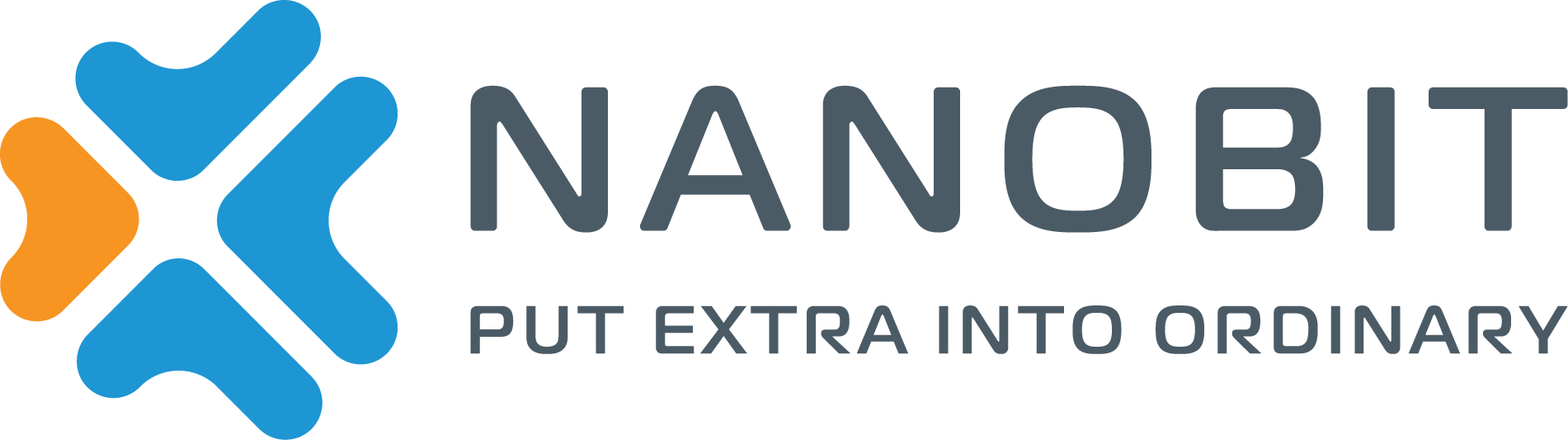
- Industry: Video games
- Founded: 2008; 18 years ago
- Founder: Alan Sumina; Zoran Vučinić
- Headquarters: Zagreb, Croatia
- Area served: Worldwide
- Number of employees: ~125 (2020)
- Website: www.nanobit.com

Nanobit is a Croatian mobile game developer from Zagreb, and subsidiary of the Stillfront Group. They specialize in iOS and Android platform games. They have opened two additional offices in Budapest and Bucharest.

== History ==
In April 2020, a strategic partnership between Nanobit and Tamatem Games was made to launch Nanobit's Hollywood Story mobile game in the MENA region. During the same year, the company was acquired by the Stillfront Group in a deal worth at least $100 million.

In 2022, it released the game Too Hot to Handle, in collaboration with Netflix, based on its show Too Hot to Handle.

In 2025, it was mentioned as among the mobile game developers criticized for promoting 'harmful stereotypes and gender-based violence' in their mobile game adverts (Hollywood Story) by Sky News.

== Games ==
Year	Title	Platform(s)
2015	Hollywood Story: Fashion Star	Android, iOS
2017	My Story: Choose Your Own Path	Android, iOS
2020	Tabou Stories: Love Episodes	Android, iOS
2022	Too Hot to Handle: Love is a Game	Android, iOS
2023	Too Hot to Handle 2	Android, iOS

== Accolades and recognition ==
The company won technological innovation Ernst & Young Entrepreneur of the Year Award in 2015. In 2014, they were on top 200 most profitable developers on Apple store.
