= The Boys of Ghost Town =

- Theatrical release poster
- Directed by: Pablo Véliz
- Screenplay by: Rosalio Martinez
- Story by: Manuel Garcia
- Produced by: Pablo Véliz
- Starring: Danny Trejo; Manuel Garcia; Marian Zapico
- Release date: April 4, 2009
- Running time: 102 minutes
- Country: United States
- Language: English

The Boys of Ghost Town is a 2009 American drama film directed and produced by Pablo Véliz and written by Rosalio Martinez and Manuel Garcia. It stars Danny Trejo, Marian Zapico, and Garcia. The film follows Danny Ortega's release from prison, struggles with joining civilization, love, friendship, revenge, and his eventual rise to becoming a drug lord himself.

== Plot ==
Danny Ortego (Manuel Garcia) is released from prison after a seventeen-year-long term for shooting his mother's abusive boyfriend moments after he raped Danny's childhood friend Natalie. He returns to Houston, Texas, and is shocked to learn that drug barons and other bosses of crime have taken over his beloved hometown. His criminal record and appearance hinders the job hunt. He eventually starts working at a Limo company after his childhood friend Corando (played by Corando Martinez, Jr.) vouches for him. Reluctantly, Corando tells Natalie that Danny is home and she goes to see him. Corando has dreams of himself with Natalie but Natalie wants to remain Corando's good friend.

Ortego finally decides to partner with Corando and push drugs while saving to start their own business. While buying drugs they are almost beaten and shot to death, until known drug lord "Big Joe" (Ricardo G. Lerma) recognizes his prison tattoo, one he shares as well. Ortego and Corando now has a steady supplier and start to indulge by buying nice cars and new houses. After a few awkward outings with Natalie, they kiss and begin a relationship. Corando visits Danny's home one morning and sees Natalie naked with Danny. He leaves, having knocked Danny down. This ends their friendship.

Danny's grandfather dies and he sees Corando, who is still upset, at the funeral. Having no reason to remain in the city now, Danny and Natalie plan to leave and start a new life. Having broke the partnership, their main customer, Mr. Maxwell, is hard pressed for more drugs. With Corando missing and not answering his phone, he threatens Danny's loved ones. Danny agrees to one last deal and en route to suppliers with Big Joe, they stop to collect cash owed to Big Joe. Big Joe is shot and dies in the car. Danny answers his phone and says he'll come instead of Big Joe.

Drug lord Captain Xavier (Danny Trejo) interrogates Danny before taking him to their Drug lord, Carlos, who remembers that his brother had shot Danny. A shootout occurs as Danny manages to escape. Enraged, Carlos sends henchmen to Danny's home, where Natalie is worried and waiting, She calls Corando and tells him Danny is not answering his phone. Danny returns home as they are waiting and is captured and badly beaten until Natalie tries to use herself to save Danny's unsaveable life. She's tricked and taken into the bedroom where she snatches a gun, now pointed at Carlos' head. Outside Corando shows up shoots the henchmen before they execute Danny. Hearing the gunshots outside, Natalie assumes they've killed Danny and commits suicide, letting Carlos run away. Danny sees Natalie's corpse and runs off after Carlos with the intention of killing him. A gun fight follows as Danny and Corando push their way through Carlos' warehouse. Danny finally finds Carlos, shoots him in the arm, leg and chest before running out of bullets. Still trying to flee, Carlos sees this and begins to smile, until Danny pulls out his knife.

Danny catches up and stabs him for Natalie. Before delivering the final death stab, Xavier arrives with his men and holds Danny at gunpoint. He contemplates letting Danny finish the job, and gazes at Carlos who is too disrespectful and unappreciative, as well as cheap with Xavier's pay. Xavier tells his guys to stand down and let Danny kill him.

Danny succeeds in tracking down Xavier, who is impressed with his determination and asks him to become their new boss. Corando arrives and reminds Danny they were leaving the drug business. The movie ends with Danny claiming "We're just getting started".

== Production ==
Filming locations included San Antonio.
