= George Katt =

American actor

George Katt (born George Katsipoutis; February 27, 1975) is an American actor who has worked in film, television and theatre.

== Early life ==
Katt was born in New York City and attended Marymount Manhattan College in New York.

== Career ==
In 2008, Katt received the Best Breakthrough Actor Award at the New York International Independent Film Festival for the role of Zachary "Zeus" Andrews in the film Valley of Angels.

Katt received the 2012 Best Supporting Actor award at the Los Angeles Movie Awards for the role of Johnny in Red Sheep.

He played Peter Fonda's son, Raylan Miller / Radar, in the film House of Bodies, and starred as Mirland 'Landi' Cela in the film Percentage. In 2016, he starred in Alienated, and the film Turnabout. Katt received the Best Actor award for his work in the role of Billy Cain in Turnabout at the 2016 Chain New York City Film Festival.

Katt played the role of Zack on the television series Rude Awakening. He played the role of Thomas/Methodical Man on the television series Blindspot, and the role of Marko Vrioni on the television series Unforgettable and the role of Officer Horvat on the CBS television series Blue Bloods.

He is the Artistic Director and founder of The Indies Lab in New York City, an independent film company.
