= Mystery Manor =

2010 video game

- Developer(s): Game Insight
- Platform(s): Facebook (Adobe Flash), iOS, Android
- Release: Facebook: March 2010 iPhone/iPad: September 2012
- Genre(s): Hidden Object

Mystery Manor is a hidden object game developed by Game Insight. It was launched in 2010 on the Facebook social media platform, it was the first game of the genre in Facebook. It was launched for Android and iOS in 2012.

== Gameplay ==
Mystery Manor is a hidden object (sometimes known as hidden picture) game. Players are given a list of items to find within a static scene. They receive points for each item found and score multipliers for completing the task quickly. Players can also use compasses to highlight items that they find difficult to see, snails to add time or hourglasses to freeze time. In between many of the levels, puzzle levels require players to find and assemble the collections of the manor.
Mystery Manor also has a map of the manor, in which players see the keys required to visit the rooms. Sometimes there are quests in the yard of the manor. Coins, jewels and experience are needed to unlock further rooms and floors in the game. Players must also defeat, trade with, or banish monsters in order to protect the manor.
New chapters of the story are written every season (winter in the manor, summer in the manor, Christmas in the manor). Each room in the Manor cycles through multiple "Exploration Modes".

- Word mode - Provides a list with the names of the objects that have to be found.
- Silhouette mode - Provides a list with the black outlines of the objects that have to be found.
- Night Mode - Provides a list with the names of the objects that have to be found and keeps most of the screen darkened, except for a player-controlled spotlight.
- Comparison Mode - Provides two side-by-side images of the room, with the goal being to "spot the difference" between the two images.

== Narrative ==
Mystery Manor is set in the mansion of Mister X, a large and isolated house full of secrets and strange phenomena. A no-named visitor (the player) arrives at the manor and meets Katherine, Mister X's secretary, who tells the visitor about the game.
