= Game Insight =

Lithuanian game developer

- Company type: Private
- Founded: 2009; 17 years ago
- Headquarters: Vilnius, Lithuania
- Key people: Igor Matsanyuk
- Industry: Video games
- Products: Paradise Island, Mystery Manor, Airport City, The Tribez, Guns of Boom.
- Employees: 600+
- Website: game-insight.com

Game Insight is a Lithuanian video game developer and publisher of free-to-play mobile games and social-network games, headquartered in Vilnius, Lithuania. The company was founded in 2009 in Moscow. Game Insight is known for its free-to-play games for iOS, Android, and Microsoft Store, including title such as Paradise Island, Airport City, The Tribez. Game Insight developed the first hidden object game for Facebook, Mystery Manor. Game Insight's portfolio includes more than 45 free-to-play games, including mobile games for Google Play, App Store, Microsoft Store, Amazon AppStore, and games for social networks, such as Facebook, localized in 10 languages and played in 218 countries of the world. The Company employs more than 500 people worldwide.

== History ==
Game Insight was founded in 2009 in Moscow, Russia. In 2010 the company launched its first game, Paradise Island (originally "Resort World"), for Facebook social network; later the game was released for mobile platforms. Paradise Island for Android was the top-grossing game on Google Play for more than 26 straight weeks.

In 2011, the company's game roster reached 50 million MAU.

In 2012, the company opened its office in San Francisco, USA. In April 2014, Game Insight closed its US office in San Francisco, employing eight people, and on May 29 moved its headquarters to Vilnius, Lithuania, to “strengthen its position as a global company and strengthen its presence in Europe as one of key markets.”

Since May 29, 2014, the company is headquartered in Vilnius, Lithuania.

On June 14, 2022, the closure of a legal entity in Russia was announced. On the same day, the access of employees of these offices to the company's resource was suspended.

== Games and platforms ==
Game Insight creates mobile games for Android, iOS and Microsoft Store, as well as for various social networks. All Game Insight products use the freemium business model, allowing players to download the games and start playing them for free, and later they can buy in-game currency and different items if that is their choice. The company's portfolio includes the following projects:

=== Active games ===
- Airport City (May 2011)
- The Tribez (Mar 2012)
- Mystery Manor (Oct 2010)
- Paradise Island 2
- Guns of Boom (May 2017)
- Mirrors of Albion (Oct 2012)
- Treasure of Time
- Trade Island
- Survival Arena
- Mercs of Boom (previously X-Mercs) - iOS (October 2015)
- Transport Empire - iOS, Android (April 2014)
- The Tribez & Castlez - iOS, Android, Amazon (February 2014), Facebook (February 2014)
- 2020: My Country - iOS, Android, Amazon, Windows 8, Windows Phone 8 (April 2013), Facebook (April 2014)
- Cloud Raiders – Android, iOS, Windows Store, Amazon (February 2014), Facebook (March 2014)
- Dragon Eternity - iPad, iPhone, Android, Amazon (March 2013), Facebook, Web (September 2013)
- Big Business Deluxe - iOS, Android, Amazon, Windows Store (August 2013)

=== Legacy games (social/mobile) ===
- Need a Hero
- Tribez at War
- Running Shadow - Android, PC (May 2014)
- Dragon Warlords - Android (September 2014)
- Adventure Era (Publishing) - iOS (March 2014)
- Sunshine Bay - iPad, iPhone (January 2014), Facebook (October 2013)
- Tank Domination - iPad, iPhone (December 2013)
- Hotel Enigma - iPad (December 2013), Facebook (August 2013)
- Love and Dragons - iPad (October 2013)
- Cat Story (Publishing) - iPhone, iPad, Android (September 2013)
- Legacy of Transylvania - iOS (September 2013), Yahoo! Mobage (April 2013)
- Starborn Wanderers - iOS, Android (July 2013)
- Battle Towers (Publishing) - Android, iOS (April 2013)
- Hidden Land - iOS (February 2013)
- Elements Battle - Android (December 2012)
- My Railway - iOS (July 2012) / Android (January 2012)
- Enchanted Realm - iOS (July 2012) / Android (December 2011)
- Rule the Kingdom - Amazon (July 2012) / iOS (June 2012) / Android (April 2012), Facebook (May 2013)
- My Country - Android (August 2012) / iOS, Android Amazon, GetJar, Tstore Korea (August 2011), Facebook, Draugiem.lv, Bebo (December 2010)
- Big Business - Android (January 2012), Facebook (October 2010)
