= Paradise Island (video game) =

2010 video game

- Developer: Game Insight
- Platforms: iOS, Android, Mac
- Release: December 2010
- Genre: Strategy

Paradise Island is a freemium mobile game available for iOS, Android, and Macintosh platforms. The game takes place on a tropical island and puts players in the role of a resort owner who must build a profitable venue for visitors by constructing a variety of buildings and decorations, as well as roads to connect amenities to each other. The game was the highest-grossing on Google Play for more than 26 weeks.

== Gameplay ==
Paradise Island is a city-building game in which players try to earn as much in-game money as possible by building the most appropriate structures in the best locations, and eventually spending their savings to unlock additional parcels of land to develop. The game has three different classes of buildings to construct (residential, entertainment, and resource-producing), and three different classes of decorations to construct (plants, attractions, and holiday-themed ornaments). Over the course of the game, players will gain experience levels that unlock higher-level buildings and decorations.

== Reception ==
Paradise Island has been fairly well received by critics, receiving a score of 4 stars out of 5 from Android Games Review writer "Wild Willy," who described it as "a fun game where you can nurture your own romantic island and it's an excellent way of killing time every day." GameZebo reviewer Talor Berthelson gave the game 2.5 stars out of 5, speaking highly of the game's music and item variety, but calling its progression system slow and challenging.
