= Opera Fatal =

1996 video game

- French cover art
- Developers: Ruske & Pühretmaier Design und Multimedia GmbH
- Publishers: Heureka-Klett, index+
- Platform: Mac OS Microsoft Windows
- Release: EU: 1996
- Genres: Graphic adventure, puzzle
- Mode: Single-player

Opera Fatal is a 1996 educational graphic adventure puzzle video game developed by Ruske & Pühretmaier Design und Multimedia GmbH and published by Heureka-Klett. The game's plot follows maestro Angelo, the orchestra director, on the night before the premiere of Beethoven's Fidelio. A mysterious thief has stolen the musical scores; to retrieve them, Angelo must solve a series of music-themed riddles that have been scattered throughout the opera house.

== Gameplay ==
The gameplay of Opera Fatal consists of first-person exploration as Angelo finds his way through the opera house. The player can interact with some specific objects by clicking or dragging them. Some items can be carried by Angelo to be used to solve a puzzle elsewhere in the opera house. The primary goal is to find the numbered questions left by the thief and to write down the correct answers in a book in the office. As more sets of questions are answered, more parts of the opera house become accessible. To aid the player in answering the questions, an interactive virtual library on music theory, musical instruments, the lives of several composers, and music history is available inside the game itself.

== Reception ==
Opera Fatal was first released in German in 1996; later versions were released in Italian, English, French, and Dutch.

Opera Fatal won several awards, including the 1997 Digita award for educational games and the 1996 Macromedia People's Choice Awards. It was also nominated for the 1997 Milia D'Or in Cannes.
