= Scum (video game) =

2025 video game

- Developer: Gamepires (Note: Additional work by Croteam.)
- Publisher: Gamepires
- Engine: Unreal Engine 4
- Platform: Windows
- Release: 17 June 2025
- Genre: Survival
- Modes: Single-player, multiplayer

Scum is a 2025 open world survival game developed and published by the Croatian studio Gamepires for Windows. It was initially released by Devolver Digital under the Steam Early Access program. The game is described as a "prison riot survival game". It entered Steam's early access program on 29 August 2018, with a full release following on 17 June 2025. The game uses Unreal Engine 4.

== Gameplay ==
The gameplay takes place in Croatia, where up to 80 players per server will attempt to survive and get off the island by first removing the implant which prevents them from leaving. The player will earn fame points through participation in various action-driven events or simply by surviving in a hostile environment. These fame points allow the player to purchase or trade higher tier items in the four various safe zones. Players will be able to fortify existing structures and points in order to secure positions or store items when needed.

Characters possess four main attributes: strength, dexterity, constitution, and intelligence. These help players create characters to suit their preferred playing style. It aims to simulate the human body, and thus has an interface called the "BCU monitor" to track character's calories, vitamins, health, and other stats. Players can choose to ignore these elements of the game, or can delve deep into these systems in order to improve the character's performance (speed, stamina, carry weight and so on). Another aspect is digestion; for instance, if a character gets all of their teeth knocked out, they will have to find a way to liquefy food to digest it. Toilet activities leave physical evidence that could be used to track that player. Aspects such as combat depend on the player's own skill, but also are affected by stamina, health, and so on. Wetness, smell, medicine, cooking, hacking, crafting, hunting, and poison also play a major role in the gameplay.

Players can easily alternate between third and first-person perspectives, and the game prevents third-person peeking by hiding anything not visible from the first-person.

SCUM also offers a realistic night vision that simulates photons hitting the lenses and the infrared light emitting from the goggles.

== Development ==
Scum was first announced in August 2016. It was set to be published by Devolver Digital, as fellow Croatian developer and Devolver division Croteam negotiated a deal to fund the game's development in 2015. The game was released into early access on August 29, 2018. Publishing rights reverted to Gamepires sometime in 2019 after Devolver and Croteam left the project; Gamepires would later be acquired by Jagex, securing a publisher as a result.

== Reception ==
The game was named as one of the best indie games of PAX East 2018 by Game Informer. It received similar attention from GameSpot, listing it as among the most noteworthy games of PAX East 2018. The game sold over 250,000 copies within its first 24 hours in early access, 700,000 in its first week, and over one million sales by the third week.

As of October 2026, an estimated 7.9 million copies of the game have been sold.
