= Airport City =

2011 free-to-play city-building simulation game

- Developer: Game Insight
- Publisher: Game Insight
- Engine: Unity
- Platforms: Facebook; Android; iOS; Amazon; Windows
- Release: Facebook: September 1, 2011 iOS: August 16, 2012; Android: February 11, 2012; Amazon: October 26, 2012; Windows: April 3, 2014
- Genres: City-building game, construction, management simulation
- Modes: Single-player, multiplayer

Airport City is a free-to-play city-building simulation game developed and published by Game Insight. Airport City was first launched on the Facebook social media platform on September 1, 2011. The game was released for Google Play on February 11, 2012, and for iOS on August 16, 2012, followed by Amazon Appstore on October 26, 2012, and Microsoft Windows on April 3, 2014. The game features mobile cross-platform play, allowing players on any supported device to cooperate and compete with each other.

As of September 2019, Game Insight has reported over 75 million Airport City registered players worldwide across all platforms.

== Gameplay ==
Airport City tasks the player with expanding a small airport into a major one, while developing a nearby town to support the airport operations with passengers from residential buildings and taxes from commercial properties.

As both city and airport grow, the space program becomes available that challenges the player to launch space missions either solo or together with other players. Another group-based activity is airline alliances that players can create to complete missions together with team members and to compete against other alliances. New content for the game involves the addition of new aircraft, buildings, destinations, and collectible items to bring back from those flights, taking the form of either expansion packs or limited time special events released roughly every month.

Seasonal events either reflect real world events, such as Halloween, Christmas, and Easter, or fictitious, such as a UFO crash landing near the city or loosely based on the events from Adventures in Wonderland novel.

== Reception ==
=== Critical response ===
Pocket-lint's Ian Morris called Airport City "the stupidest, most annoying game we've ever played on Android" that manages to be quite addictive with something to do all the time, and "perfecty possible, and enjoyable" to play for free despite its repetitive nature. Pete Davison writing for the Adweek named Airport City a "solid game with a decent amount of depth", although pointing out that the game has few flaws which mar the experience, such as no cross-platform play between Facebook and mobile versions.

Android Apps Review's Valerie Lauer gave the game a score of 4/5, praising the graphics for a solid amount of detail and calling it "perfect for fans of the builder genre or airplane enthusiasts" with the "balanced gameplay and unique combination of ideas".

Modojo rated Airport City 4/5, praising its economy, real world destinations, and "endless" supply of missions, while criticizing it for being "tough to advance without spending money". Gamezebo's Leif Johnson gave the Facebook version of the game a lower grade of 3/5 and seconded that opinion, stating that "Airport City isn't a bad game at heart; it merely demands a little too much for what amounts to an overly familiar model with a niche gimmick". Jon Mundy from Pocket Gamer found the game is "all about logistics of putting a working airport together" with an endless treadmill of upgrades, while noting that expanding land is "rather expensive and will test your attachment to the game". CNET rated Airport City 4/5 in its review and remarked that it "borrows a lot of cues from The Sims series of games while still feeling different enough to keep you interested".

=== Sales and playerbase ===
Airport City has reached 1.6 million active players on Facebook in October 2011. As of November 2018, Facebook version has 800,000 active players. After release on Android in February 2012, Airport City had 1 million installs following month, and was among Android's top grossing apps for several months in a row after that. The game topped weekly free iPad apps chart in the UK following its release on iOS in August 2012. By March 2014, Game Insight has reported that Airport City has reached 37 million players overall and $33 million in gross revenue. The application has seen over 50 million downloads on the Google Play Store as of April 2024.
