= Guns of Boom =

2017 online multiplayer first-person shooter video game

Guns of Boom (also known as Gods of Boom)
- Developer: Game Insight
- Publisher: Game Insight
- Engine: Unity
- Platforms: iOS, Android
- Release: WW: 18 May 2017
- Genre: First-person shooter
- Mode: Multiplayer

Guns of Boom, known as Gods of Boom from 19 November 2019 until 4 May 2021, is an online multiplayer first-person shooter video game for mobile devices. It was developed by Game Insight and released on 16 May 2017, for iOS and Android. Guns of Boom has reached a total of 55 million downloads by the end of 2018 and is available in 14 different languages.

== Game play ==
Guns of Boom is an online team-based multiplayer first-person shooter. In Guns of Boom, players are ranked by their level. The highest level is 50 with players leveling up by gaining more experience points through participating in battles. Trophies are won but lost only when the battle is left in between the battle time. The players are divided into 2 teams, each containing 4 players. The gameplay consists of 5 minutes per game, with the team finishing with the highest points adjudged the winners. They can also have other player's weapons once they are killed by the player. Every two weeks, the ratings in all the Platinum league are reset to 30,000 rating points. The players receive the rewards appropriate to their position in the ratings, Top-500 goes to the Hall of Fame. This is called a leaderboard .

== Reception ==
In three weeks starting in May 2017, the game was downloaded 5 million times and earned US$1 million in revenue. Campbell Bird of 148apps gave Guns of Boom 4/5, describing it as a multiplayer shooter that falls just short of being amazing, thanks to some weird f2p design. He also criticizes how the game deals with grenades and health kits that are disposable resources, and can conceivably run out and tip the scales of the fight in favor of whoever is fine with expending their resources to survive more. Harry Slater of AppSpy describes the game as ‘a shooter that works on touchscreen’, ‘a team-based FPS in the vein of Team Fortress 2' and ‘not the freshest idea, but it's wonderfully put together’. In another Guns of Boom review by Slater, for Pocket Gamer this time, it is stated that Guns of Boom has one of the worst names he has ever had the misfortune to read during his time writing about mobile games. He also says that Guns of Boom is ‘an essential mobile multiplayer experience’, ‘with gorgeous cartoon graphics that fizzes and pops in some of the best ways possible’. John Hoff of Android Community describes Guns of Boom as a multiplayer online FPS that is actually fun and engaging but has an awful name.

== Legal ==
There have been many cheaters in the game since its release in 2017. One of the most notorious providers was named "AutoSkillz". As these kinds of applications were ruining the online experience of many players and causing Game Insight to lose revenue, Game Insight decided to take legal action. Ultimately, AutoSkillz came to an agreement with Game Insight, where they would drop the charges if AutoSkillz stopped providing cheats for their game. In addition to this, there have been many other instances similar to this where action had to be taken, such as on a forum named "Polarmods", where cheating content based around the game had to be taken down because it violated the Digital Millennium Copyright Act.
