= Bioscopia =

2001 video game

- Release: 2001
- Genres: Educational, adventure

Bioscopia: Where Science Conquers Evil (aka Biolab) is a 2001 educational adventure video game. It is a sister game to Physicus and Chemicus.

== Gameplay ==
Gameplay is similar to 1993 video game Myst.

== Critical reception ==
Reception

Review scores
Publication	Score
Adventure Gamers	4/5 stars
Metzomagic	3.5/5 stars
Gameboomers	B+
Tap Repeatedly	A
PC Mag	4/5 stars
Christian Centered Gamer	C+
Adventure Treff	79%
Adventure Archiv	90%
Gameboomers	B+
Just Adventure	B
Game Chronicles	8.2

The game received positive reviews from critics, praising its puzzles, educational content, and graphics.

=== Awards and nominations ===
- 2002 Bologna New Media Prize
