= The Fight: Lights Out =

2010 video game

- North American cover art
- Developer: ColdWood Interactive
- Publisher: Sony Computer Entertainment
- Platform: PlayStation 3
- Release: EU: November 5, 2010; NA: November 9, 2010; AU: November 11, 2010; JP: November 18, 2010
- Genre: Fighting
- Modes: Single player, multiplayer

The Fight: Lights Out is a 2010 fighting video game developed by ColdWood Interactive and published by Sony Computer Entertainment for the PlayStation 3. It utilizes the PlayStation Move controllers. It was unveiled at the 2010 Game Developers Conference in San Francisco and was released in November 2010.

== Gameplay ==
The game is presented with predominantly black-and-white graphics and bright red blood. In the game, the player takes control of a character in a one-on-one fight with another character. Players use the PlayStation Move to control characters' attacks, such as punches, jabs and uppercuts by performing the same moves in real life using the controller. There are twenty-three moves available to the player.

== Reception ==
Reception

Aggregate score
Aggregator	Score
Metacritic	48/100

Review scores
Publication	Score
Edge	3/10
Eurogamer	5/10
Famitsu	28/40
Game Informer	6.5/10
GameRevolution	C−
GameSpot	5/10
GameTrailers	3.6/10
GameZone	3/10
IGN	3/10
Joystiq	2/5 stars
PlayStation: The Official Magazine	4/10
Push Square	7/10 stars
Metro	3/10

The Fight received "generally unfavorable reviews" according to the review aggregation website Metacritic. Joystiq said, "Take this mess of iffy hit detection and blocking, tack on perfunctory online multiplayer and a half-realized match gambling system, and you have a game ... sort of." IGN said the game was "a mess that is not only frustrating to play – it is also tiring and boring." In Japan, Famitsu gave it a better score of two sevens, one six, and one eight for a total of 28 out of 40.
