= Gary Gadget =

Video game

- Genre: Adventure game
- Publisher: Levande Böcker
- Platforms: Windows PC; Macintosh

Gary Gadget (called Mulle Meck in Sweden, Masa Mainio in Finland, Mulle Mekk in Norway and Willy Werkel in Germany) is a series of computer games originally published in Sweden by Levande Böcker. The series debuted in 1997. Since then, five games have been published, one of which has been translated into English. There are also translations into other languages. In Germany, four games were published by the company Terzio Verlag. All five games have been translated into Dutch and published by the company Transposia. Gary Gadget is called Miel Monteur in Dutch.

The computer games are based on the Swedish children's book series of the same name, by George Johansson and Jens Ahlbom.

== Platforms ==
All five parts are available for Windows, four of them also for Apple Mac, except for the computer game Bygg flygplan med Mulle Meck.

== Game Mechanics ==
In all of the five published games about Gary Gadget there are some elements that always persist. Depending on the game you are playing the objective of the game is to build a certain thing, ranging from cars and ships to spacecraft. You always start from Gary's base of operations, which differ from game to game, where the actual building takes place. You build through a drag and drop-system by dragging fitting parts from Gary's storage house onto a template of the thing that you are building.

The games don't have a final objective. Instead, you gather parts, keep building new things and explore the world.

== Content ==
The computer games are about a man named Gary Gadget, a general handyman who throughout the five games builds cars, ships, planes, houses and space ships.

=== Bygg bilar med Mulle Meck (Gary Gadget: Building Cars) ===
In the first video game, Bygg bilar med Mulle Meck, published in 1997, Gary builds cars from various parts and junk that he finds and drives through the town. You can find new parts at random on the ground while driving through the in-game map. You can also receive parts from Gary's friend Freddy Ferrick, the scrap dealer, who gives Gary car parts at random instances in the game. Freddy also often loses his dog which you can bring back to him. Gary gets orders from different people during the video game, which the player should fulfill.

The first game is the only one which has been published in English so far.

=== Bygg båtar med Mulle Meck ===
In the second game Bygg båtar med Mulle Meck, published in 1998, Gary builds ships. In the beginning, the player learns that Gary has driven down a road in a car and wanted to know how to go on. So Gary made a rowing boat and paddled along. Gary reaches a shipyard. There, the owner asks him to take care of the yard, while she goes sailing around the world. In this game, Gary receives again tasks which the player must fulfill. The parts for building his ships are bought from Doris Digital.

=== Bygg flygplan med Mulle Meck ===
In the third game Bygg flygplan med Mulle Meck, published in 2000, the player gets to know that Gary has found the abandoned hangar of two airplanes constructors and wants to try that trade. Again he receives his parts from Doris Digital. Gary flies to visit his friends and like in the previous episodes he gets orders which the player must complete.

=== Bygg hus med Mulle Meck ===
In the fourth part Bygg hus med Mulle Meck, published in 2002, Gary Gadget finds his house in debris after a storm caused a tree to fall on it. He promptly starts to builds houses. In this instance you can travel around the game map via both car and boat.

=== Upptäck rymden med Mulle Meck ===
The fifth episode Upptäck rymden med Mulle Meck, which was published in 2004, starts with Gary contemplating that while he had built houses in Bygg hus med Mulle Meck he had also been sitting on the porch of his house, watching the sky. An unofficial Finnish version has been made of it by "Nostalgia-TV productions". Thereupon he became eager to fly into space. In this game, the player not only flies into outer space but also completes tasks down on Earth. Gary visits his friends by car. Of course he also builds his own spacecraft.

== Reception ==
The German c’t magazine rated the game Bygg bilar med Mulle Meck thus: "Autos bauen mit Willi Werkel ist nett gemacht, kann aber eigene Bastelerfahrungen nicht ersetzen. [Bygg bilar med Mulle Meck is made nicely but cannot make up for one's own construction experience.]" Netzwelt.de tested Bygg flygplan med Mulle Meck on 7 February 2010, concluding that it was well suitable for children at primary school age.

c’t tested the episodes Bygg flygplan med Mulle Meck in issue 17/2001, Bygg hus med Mulle Meck in 23/2003 and Upptäck rymden med Mulle Meck in 24/2005.

== Awards ==
- 2000: Impuls Gütesiegel for Bygg båtar med Mulle Meck.
- 2007: Best Products Call for Gary Gadget: Building Cars.
- 2007: National Parenting Center Seal of Approval for Gary Gadget: Building Cars.
- 2007: Notable Computer Software for Children for Gary Gadget: Building Cars.
- 2007: Parents' Choice Awards for Gary Gadget: Building Cars.
