= AC Transit bus fight =

2010 American viral video

The AC Transit Bus fight is an American viral video depicting a physical altercation between two men aboard an AC Transit bus in Oakland, California, on February 15, 2010. The altercation was recorded by a nearby passenger, who uploaded it to video hosting website YouTube. It ranked among the top five most viewed videos on YouTube in its first week, but was not included in the official list, and has received over six million views.

In the video, passengers Thomas Bruso and Michael Lovette argue over an unspecified matter, which leads to Lovette throwing a punch and Bruso responding by beating him to the floor. Bruso, nicknamed "Epic Beard Man" due to his prominent white beard, would become an internet meme and cult hero. The event also raised concerns following a number of previous incidents involving violence on the public transport system in Oakland.

The incident inspired the 2012 action film Bad Ass, which starred Danny Trejo as a fictional character similar to Bruso. Two sequels also starring Trejo, Bad Asses and Bad Asses on the Bayou, were released in 2014 and 2015.

== Incident ==
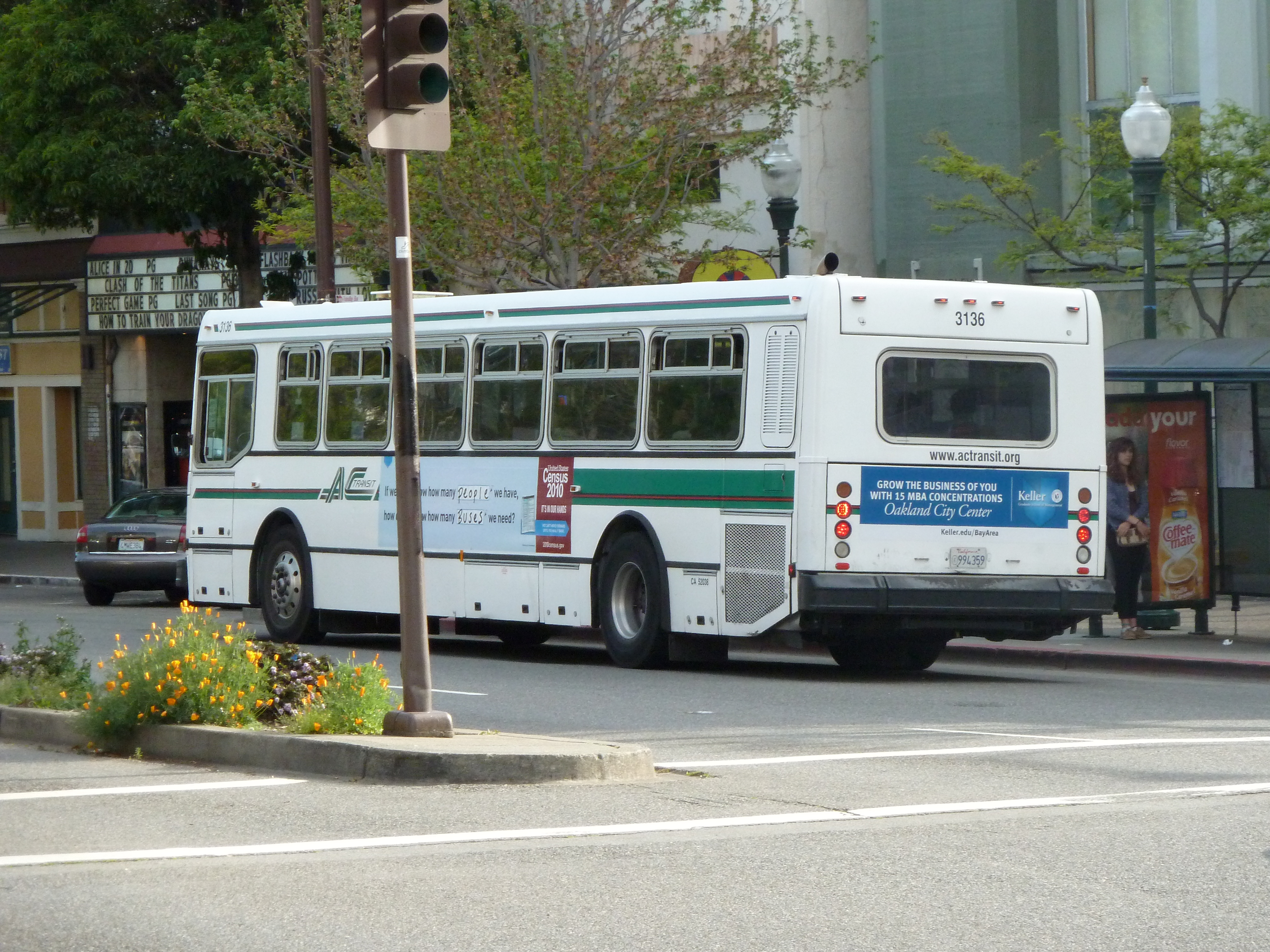
The incident took place aboard an AC Transit bus similar to this one

The incident took place in downtown Oakland on an Alameda-Contra Costa Transit District (AC Transit) Line NL bus bound for San Francisco, and involved a black man, identified as Michael Lovette, and an older white bearded man identified as Thomas Alexander Bruso, who later came to be referred to as "Epic Beard Man". The events in the bus were recorded by Iyanna Washington.

In the video, Bruso is seen wearing a light blue T-shirt that reads "I AM a Motherfucker" on the back. Bruso is seated across from Lovette near the rear of the bus. Exactly how the argument started is unclear in the video, but the conversation quickly became heated, with Lovette angrily asking Bruso, "Why's a brother got to spit shine your shoes?" Bruso has stated in later interviews that Lovette overheard him referring to a person that "was gonna shine his shoes", misinterpreting it as a racial statement, with Bruso saying later in the video that "a brother [...] could be anyone, he could be a Chinaman!" After additional charged exchanges, Bruso says "you ain't scaring this white boy," and walks away from Lovette to the front of the bus.

Much of their conversation is inaudible, and some riders discourage Lovette from approaching Bruso, while others such as Washington encourage him to attack, saying "Say it again, Pinky!" and "Beat his white ass, whoop his ass". When the verbal exchange starts to die down again, Lovette begins walking back to his seat, at which point Bruso yells "I see tough guys like you and I slap the shit out of them!" Lovette responds "What!?", turns around and walks back toward Bruso, and swings at Bruso. Bruso stands and punches Lovette several times, knocking Lovette to the floor. View of the men is lost briefly while Washington moves closer to the commotion; when view resumes, Bruso is shown with Lovette, who is now bleeding from facial injuries, in his grasp. Bruso releases Lovette, exclaiming "I told you not to fuck with me!", and then exits the bus, and is still yelling when the bus makes its next stop. After another exchange, Lovette returns to his seat in the rear of the bus. Washington then takes a bag Bruso left behind and carries it to the back of the bus. Washington offers Lovette the use of her recording if he wishes to press charges, but Lovette never acknowledges the offer, instead requesting an ambulance.

In a second video, Bruso, now on the street, continues to yell about the fight. He loudly mentions Vietnam and kicks a newspaper dispenser before walking away. Both men were treated at a local hospital for their injuries. Bruso underwent psychiatric evaluation at John George Psychiatric Pavilion in San Leandro. Neither man was arrested.

=== Videographer's response ===
On February 17, 2010, Washington posted her own perspective of the events on YouTube. In this video, Washington says she hopes to "clear some things up" (see 0:38s). She goes on later to say, "I would like to apologize to anyone who took offense to any part of this video" (see 3:14—3:21).

Responding to allegations that Lovette was her "companion", Washington makes clear, "I've never seen these two gentlemen ever before in my life", and claims she did not intend to steal Bruso's bag (though her companion says "go through that shit" while the camera is on Bruso's bag, which she picked up from the front of the bus and brought back to her seat). In a subsequent interview, when asked if he got his "stuff back", Bruso said Sheriff's deputies ultimately did return his belongings, except an identification card and some money, "about three hours later." See @ (3:55—4:05). Washington also appeared in a local CBS news video interview giving her version of events.

== Thomas Bruso ==
Bruso was born in Michigan. In interviews, Bruso claimed to be a Vietnam War veteran who also worked as a pimp in Chicago. He also claimed that his mother once stuck him into an oven and that he had beaten up his father. Bruso's sister refuted these claims, stating that Bruso has bipolar disorder and would make claims like these when unmedicated. In addition to the "AC Transit Fight", another video involving Thomas Bruso was uploaded to YouTube. He was stunned with a taser twice at the Oakland Coliseum by police on August 3, 2009, for sitting in empty seats at a ball game, questioning what he did wrong, then for failing to immediately comply with police officers who demanded he move from the empty section. He was charged with resisting arrest and taken to a psychiatric hospital for evaluation.

=== Interviews with Bruso ===
Bruso was the subject of several interviews, including one shot in San Francisco by KRON on February 19, 2010. Nathan Hartley Maas, a graphic designer from Portland, Oregon, produced a documentary short titled I Am a Motherfucker, in which Bruso is interviewed about his personal background, day-to-day activity, and thoughts on his contemporary celebrity status. The documentary was uploaded to YouTube.

=== Homeless ===
Bruso was reported to have been evicted and homeless in 2011.

== Spread of the meme ==
Within a short time of the original video going viral, musical and animated parodies about the fight began to appear on YouTube in a manner similar to the way parodies spread after the "Don't tase me, bro!" University of Florida Taser incident. The Huffington Post called the AC Transit Bus Fight "the fastest growing public fight meme ever".

== See also ==
- The Bus Uncle – Another viral video of an altercation on a bus
