= Bad Ass (film) =

2012 American action film

- Film poster
- Directed by: Craig Moss
- Written by: Craig Moss; Elliot Tishman
- Produced by: Ash R. Shah
- Starring: Danny Trejo; Charles S. Dutton; Patrick Fabian; Joyful Drake; John Duffy; Harrison Page; Richard Riehle; Ron Perlman
- Cinematography: John Barr
- Edited by: Jim Flynn
- Music by: Todd Haberman
- Production companies: Amber Lamps, LLC; Silver Nitrate
- Distributed by: Samuel Goldwyn Films; 20th Century Fox (Non-USA, USA DVD)
- Release date: April 13, 2012
- Running time: 90 minutes
- Country: United States
- Language: English

Bad Ass is a 2012 American action film written and directed by Craig Moss. The film stars Danny Trejo, Charles S. Dutton, and Ron Perlman. It is loosely based on the 2010 AC Transit Bus fight viral video.

== Plot ==
Unemployed Vietnam War veteran Frank Vega gains unexpected fame when he beats up two abusive skinheads on a bus. Nicknamed "Bad Ass," he becomes a celebrity, with his face on T-shirts and graffiti. He is even invited on talk shows and offered ride-alongs by the police.

His best friend and fellow veteran, Klondike Washington, moves in with him and entrusts Frank with a USB flash drive. However, Klondike is murdered in an alley by two thugs, leaving Frank devastated.

Frustrated by the police's lack of progress, Frank takes it upon himself to investigate. He discovers a spent cartridge casing and a pendant with a woman's picture at the crime scene. The pendant leads him to a pawn shop where he learns it belongs to a man named Terence.

Frank tracks Terence down and learns that Terence is with his girlfriend. After finding her at a massage parlor, Frank follows her and breaks into her house. He interrogates Terence about his boss, who ordered Klondike's murder. Frank discovers that Klondike was killed because of the flash drive, which contains information about an oil well project connected to Mayor Williams.

Frank eventually hands the flash drive to Officer Malark and confronts Panther, the drug lord responsible for Klondike's murder. Frank is captured and tortured to get him to reveal the flash drive's location. Panther discovers Frank's address in his wallet and heads there. Frank follows and beats Panther in a fight. Panther is arrested, and the news exposes Mayor Williams' involvement in the scandal. Frank moves forward with his life.

== Cast ==
- Danny Trejo as Frank Ryan Vega
  - Shalim Ortiz as Young Frank Vega
- Charles S. Dutton as "Panther"
- Chris Spencer as Martin Sr.
- Christine Clayburg as News Anchor
- Craig Sheffer as Attorney
- Tonita Castro as Juanita Lupe Vega
- Duane Whitaker as Rex
- Ezra Buzzington as Feeble Clerk
- Frank Maharajh as Detective Shah
- Harrison Page as Klondike Washington
- Isabella Cascarano as Agata
- Jennifer Blanc as Frances
- Jillian Murray as Lindsay Kendall
- John Duffy as Martin Jr.
- Joyful Drake as Amber Lamps
- Patrick Fabian as Office Malark
- Patricia De Leon as Marissa
- Richard Riehle as Father Miller
- Ron Perlman as Mayor Williams
- Sam Rubin as Interviewer
- Winter Ave Zoli as Tatiana
- Craig Moss as Generous Bus Driver
- Danny Woodburn as Master Sluggy Cornnuts

== Production ==
Bad Ass was loosely based on the AC Transit Bus fight, which was filmed by a bystander and became a viral video on YouTube. Production was completed by May 2011.

== Soundtrack ==
- I'm a Bad Ass (Kid Frost & Big Tank)
- Amazing (Big L.A., Glasses Malone & Jah Free)
- Llévame Contigo (Pancho & Sancho)
- Six Million Ways To Die (Kid Frost ft. Clika One)
- I'm On My Way (Big Tank, Spirit & Butch Cassidy)
- Coochie Cantina (Pancho & Sancho)
- Stay Ready (Big Tank & Spirit)
- Y Porque Perder (Pancho & Sancho)
- Take Me Down (Pancho & Sancho)
- Take Me Down (Spanglish) (Pancho & Sancho)
- Stay Ready (Clean) (Big Tank & Spirit)
- Blood Sweat and Tears ("Stay Ready" Instrumental) (Chef Raw C Beatz)

== Release ==
SC Films picked up sales rights to the film with plans to present it to buyers at the Cannes Film Festival. The film has been sold to Wild Bunch for distribution in Germany and to Pinnacle Films for distribution in Australia. Subsequently, distribution arrangements were made with Samuel Goldwyn Films for USA theatrical release on April 13, 2012, as well as 20th Century Fox for ancillary rights and international all media distribution.

== Reception ==
Reviews of the film were mostly negative, with some news articles wondering if the film was actually real or a hoax. Vulture's Sarah Benned commented on the preview, saying "This trailer for Bad Ass (loosely based on this viral video) is either a parody, the trailer for a parody, or just an excuse to make Danny Trejo beat people up while wearing a fanny pack. It's your call." Cinema Blend compared the trailer to Trejo's mock-trailer for Machete, saying "This could be a spoof trailer sandwiched in the middle of a Grindhouse sequel. Then again, that worked for Machete, so why couldn't it kick-start Bad Ass, as well?"

Los Angeles Times critic Mark Olsen stated, "It's often difficult to tell what's bad on purpose or just badly handled. Perhaps it is just difficult to compete with the strange spontaneity of something like a viral video; the way it takes on its own momentum may be something that can't be replicated."

On Rotten Tomatoes, the film has a 20% approval rating, based on reviews from 5 critics.

== Sequels ==
Two sequels have been released. The first, Bad Ass 2: Bad Asses, was released in 2014, and co-starred Danny Glover. Trejo and Glover were paired again for the third film, Bad Asses on the Bayou, released on March 6, 2015.
