= Heads Up! (game show) =

American television game show

- Genre: Game show
- Based on: Heads Up!
- Starring: Loni Love
- Country of origin: United States
- No. of seasons: 1
- No. of episodes: 65

Production
- Producer: Ellen DeGeneres
- Running time: 30 minute episodes
- Production companies: A Very Good Production; Telepictures

Original release
- Network: HLN (Unaired); Family Channel

Heads Up! is an American television game show based on the mobile app of the same name, itself inspired by a segment on The Ellen DeGeneres Show. The series is hosted by Loni Love.

Sixty-five episodes of the show were produced for HLN, but prior to airing, the channel shelved it in March 2016. The production company behind the series, Telepictures, confirmed they were looking into other possible partners. The completed episodes would eventually air in Canada on Family Channel and Family Chrgd.

== See also ==
- List of television series canceled before airing an episode
