= Loni Love =

American actress, comedian, and television personality

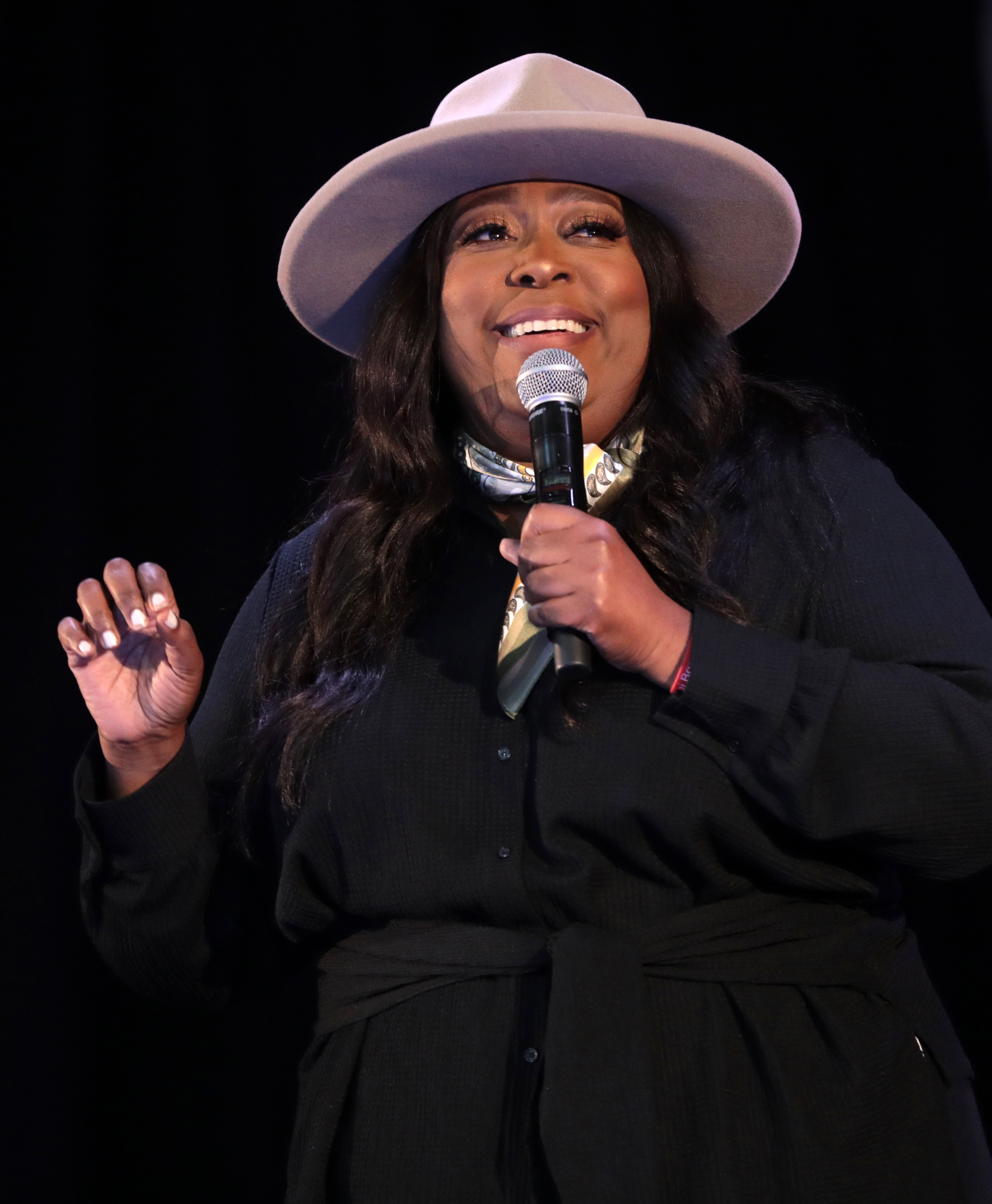
- Love in 2022
- Born: July 14, 1971 (age 55); Detroit, Michigan, U.S.
- Education: Prairie View A&M University (BEE)
- Occupations: Comedian; television personality; actress; author
- Years active: 2000–present
- Television: The Real; Star Search; Judge Judy
- Partner(s): James Welsh (2018–2025)
- Website: lonilove.com

Loni Love (born July 14, 1971) is an American comedian, television host, actress, author, and former electrical engineer. While working as an electrical engineer in the early 2000s, she switched to music engineering, until later launching a career in stand-up comedy. She was the runner-up on Star Search 2003 and was named among the "Top 10 Comics to Watch" in both Variety and Comedy Central in 2009. She was one of the co-hosts of the syndicated daytime talk show The Real, for which she also won a Daytime Emmy Award for Outstanding Entertainment Talk Show Host in 2018. The show ran from July 15, 2013, and ended on June 3, 2022.

== Life and career ==
Love was born in Detroit, Michigan, and grew up in the Brewster-Douglass Housing Projects. Prior to her career as a comedian, she was an electrical engineer, an experience she talks about in many of her acts. After graduating from Cass Technical High School in 1989, she worked for a time on the General Motors assembly line putting doors on 1993 Oldsmobile Cutlasses, work which ignited her interest in electrical engineering. Love then received her bachelor's degree in electrical engineering from Prairie View A&M University in Texas. While at Prairie View, she minored in music and was also a member of the Eta Beta chapter of Delta Sigma Theta. It was there that she discovered stand-up comedy after winning a $50 competition and then performed frequently during her college life.

After finding work as an engineer at Xerox in California, she continued to do stand-up after work in clubs and became a regular at the Laugh Factory. After eight years of working at Xerox, Love resigned to pursue comedy during a layoff to prevent someone else from losing their job. Love did a series on VH1 called I Love the 2000s in which she gives her view on pop culture highlights. She was also a panelist in the late-night talk show Chelsea Lately. Love also appeared in an episode of Supermarket Sweep on July 24, 2000.

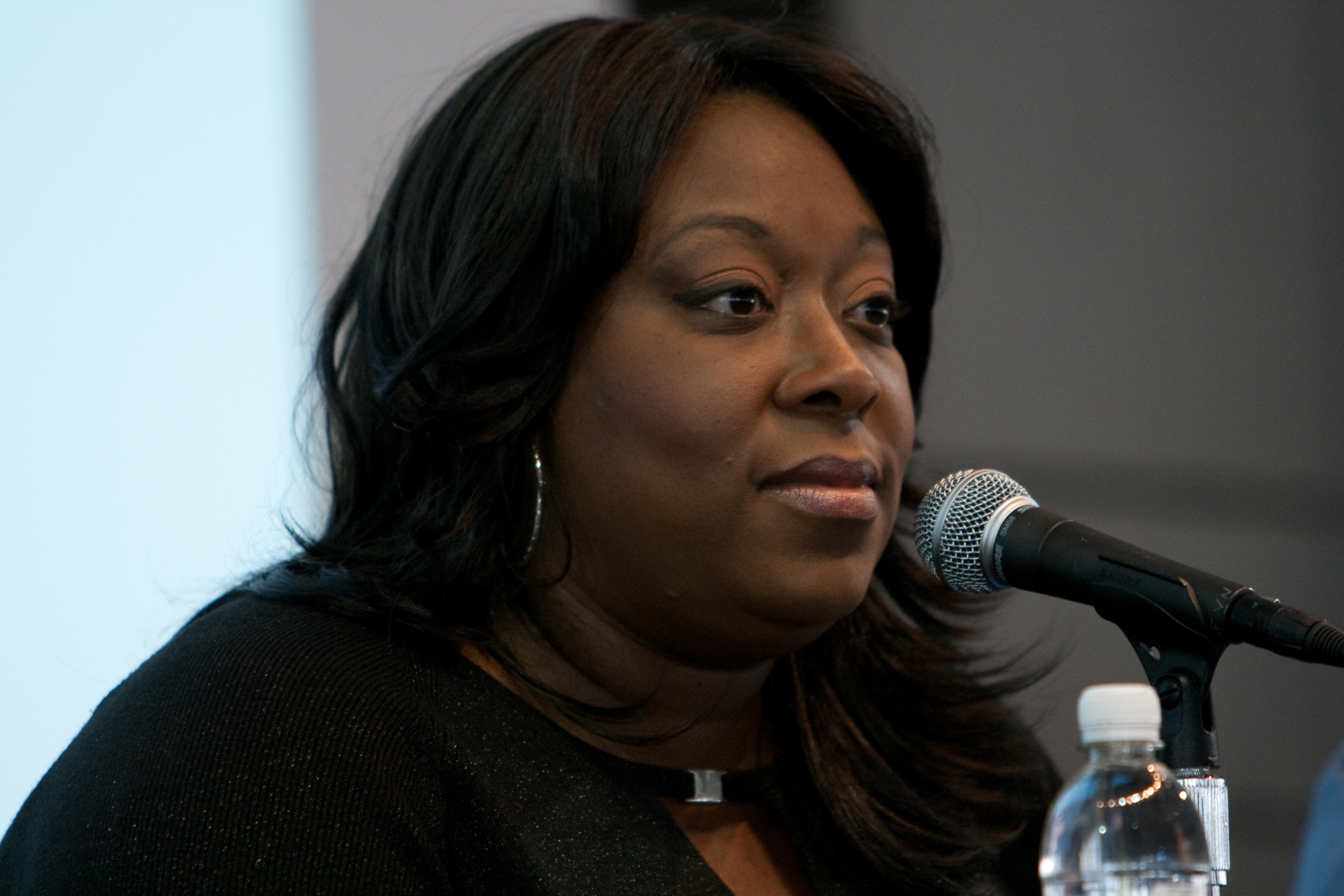
Love in 2009

Love started her comedic career in 2003, after appearing on Star Search, reaching the finals and losing in a close competition to winner John Roy. Since then, she has appeared in films and numerous television shows. Love was named "Hot Comic" for 2009 in Campus Activity magazine and one of the "Top 10 Comics to Watch" in both Variety and Comedy Central. She was awarded the Jury Prize for best stand-up at the 2003 US Comedy Arts Festival. In 2008 Love became the CNN correspondent for D. L. Hughley Breaks the News and covered the inauguration of President Barack Obama. In late 2009, Love recorded her first one-hour Comedy Central special, America's Sister, which aired on May 8, 2010. In July 2013, she released her first comedy advice book titled "Love Him Or Leave Him But Don't Get Stuck With The Tab". It was published by Simon & Schuster.

From July 15, 2013, to June 3, 2022, Love served as one of the co-hosts of the syndicated daytime talk show The Real originally alongside Adrienne Bailon, Tamar Braxton, Jeannie Mai, and Tamera Mowry. After premiering on July 15, 2013, on Fox Television Stations, The Real was picked up to series the following year. In 2015, she appeared in the comedy film Paul Blart: Mall Cop 2, with Kevin James, and the action film Bad Asses on the Bayou, with Danny Trejo and Danny Glover.In the same year, Warner Bros. shopped for a revival of classic 80s/90s dating show Love Connectionwith Love as its possible host for a possible replacement for the syndicated interactive game show Let's Ask America that aired on several Scripps-owned stations. However, plans for it backfired since then. She also won the ninth season of Worst Cooks in America in 2016, winning $50,000 for her chosen charity. In 2018, Love and her Real co-hosts won the Daytime Emmy Award for Outstanding Entertainment Talk Show Host for their work.

In 2020 during the COVID-19 pandemic, Love hosts a show on Instagram Live under the hashtag #quarantinewithloni. Love's show attracts 50,000 to 100,000 viewers.

Since January 2021, Love has been a recurring guest judge on season 13 of Rupaul's Drag Race. Love currently hosts, alongside Alec Mapa, Squirrel Friends: The Official Rupaul's Drag Race Podcast since 2022.

== Filmography ==
Film
Year	Film	Role	Notes
2019	Adopt a Highway	Cher	
2016	Mother's Day	Kimberly	
2015	Bad Asses on the Bayou	Carmen	
2015	Paul Blart: Mall Cop 2	Donna Ericone	
2014	Gutshot Straight	Ms. Love	
2014	Bad Asses	Carmen	
2004	Soul Plane	Shaniece	
2004	With or Without You	Waitress	
Television
Year	Title	Role	Notes
2026	Hey A.J.!	Tiff (voice)	Recurring role
2023	The $100,000 Pyramid	Self - Celebrity Player	Episode: "RuPaul vs Lauren Lapkus and Steve Schirripa vs Loni Love"
2022	Hell's Kitchen	Herself	Guest diner; Episode: "Breakfast 911"
2022	E! Daily Pop	Herself	Co-host
2022	The Real Housewives of Beverly Hills	Herself	Episode: "It Takes A Villain"
2022	Is It Cake?	Herself	Judge
2021–2022	RuPaul's Drag Race	Herself	guest judge; 4 episodes (season 13; "RuPaulmark Channel"); 1 episode (season 14)
2020	RuPaul's Secret Celebrity Drag Race	Herself/Mary J. Ross	Contestant
2020	The Funny Dance Show	Herself	Judge
2017	Kevin Can Wait	Yvette	Guest star (1 episode)
2017	Funny You Should Ask	Herself	5 episodes
2016	Heads Up!	Herself	Host (65 episodes)
2016	Worst Cooks in America	Herself	Winner
2015	American Dad!	Iris (voice)	Guest star (1 episode)
2014	The Ellen DeGeneres Show	Herself	Recurring Guest star & DJ
2014	I Love the 2000s	Herself	
2013–2022	The Real	Herself	Talk show; co-host & producer
2012	Bethenny	Herself	
2011	Mr. Young	Detective Dr. Dimitria DaDoodoo II, esq. Ph.D. MD Ed.d.	
2011	Whitney	Nurse	
2011	Phineas and Ferb the Movie: Across the 2nd Dimension	Carl's Saleswoman's Disguise	Television film
2011–2013	Kickin' It	Marge	Recurring (5 episodes)
2011–2013	After Lately	Herself	
2010	The Gossip Queens	Herself	
2009	Wildest TV Show Moments	Herself	
2009	D. L. Hughley Breaks the News	Herself	
2008	GSN Live	Herself	
2008	Phineas and Ferb	Herself	Episode: "Carl's Saleswoman Disguise"
2008–2014	Chelsea Lately	Herself	Panelist
2008–2014	World's Dumbest...	Herself	
2008	Chocolate News	Herself	
2008	I Love the New Millennium	Herself	
2008	Comics Unleashed	Herself	
2007	Wild 'n Out	Herself	Season 4 Recurring cast Member
2006	Thick and Thin	Viola	Series regular
2006	I Love the '70s: Volume 2	Herself	
2006	I Love Toys	Herself	
2005	I Love the Holidays	Herself	Special
2005	I Love the '80s 3-D	Herself	
2005	The Tonight Show with Jay Leno	Herself	Featured comic
2005	Weekends at the DL	Herself	Panelist
2005	Cuts	Pepper	Guest star (1 episode)
2005	I Love the '90s: Part Deux	Herself	
2004–2007	Ned's Declassified School Survival Guide	Lunch Lady	Recurring
2004	Girlfriends	Woman	Guest star
2004	Redlight, Greenlight	Herself	Series host
2004	I Love the '90s	Herself	
2004	Premium Blend	Herself	
2003–2004	Hollywood Squares	Herself	
2003	Star Search	Herself	Finalist
2003	I Love the '80s Strikes Back	Herself	
2003	I Love the '70s	Herself	

== Awards and nominations ==
=== Emmy Awards ===
Year	Category	Work	Result
2016	Outstanding Entertainment Talk Show Host	The Real	Nominated
2017	Outstanding Entertainment Talk Show Host	The Real	Nominated
2018	Outstanding Entertainment Talk Show Host	The Real	Won
2019	Outstanding Entertainment Talk Show Host	The Real	Nominated

=== NAACP Image Awards ===
Year	Category	Work	Result
2017	Outstanding Talk Series	The Real	Nominated
2018	Outstanding Talk Series	The Real	Won
2019	Outstanding Talk Series	The Real	Won
2020	Outstanding Talk Series	The Real	Nominated
2022	Outstanding Talk Series	The Real	Nominated
2022	Outstanding Host in a Talk or News / Information (Series or Special)	The Real	Nominated
