= Bad Asses =

2014 American action film

- Theatrical film poster
- Directed by: Craig Moss
- Written by: Craig Moss
- Produced by: Ash R. Shah; Ben Feingold; Jim Busfield
- Starring: Danny Trejo; Danny Glover; Andrew Divoff; Jacqueline Obradors; Ignacio Serricchio; Patrick Fabian; Jeremy Ray Valdez; Leon Thomas III; Jonathan Lipnicki
- Cinematography: Paul Marschall
- Edited by: Clark Burnett
- Music by: Todd Haberman
- Production company: Silver Nitrate
- Distributed by: 20th Century Fox Home Entertainment
- Release date: February 17, 2014
- Running time: 91 minutes
- Country: United States
- Language: English

Bad Asses (also known as Bad Ass 2: Bad Asses) is a 2014 American action film starring Danny Trejo and Danny Glover, written and directed by Craig Moss. The film is a sequel to the 2012 film Bad Ass, and was released on DVD during spring 2014.

== Plot ==
After the events of the previous film, Vietnam War veteran and Los Angeles resident Frank Vega has opened a community boxing center and coaches young boxers. He shares his building with liquor store owner Bernie Pope, a grumpy old man who has agoraphobia.

Frank mentors Manny Parks, his star pupil who is preparing for his professional boxing debut. Frank and Manny start watching a video of his upcoming opponent, but Manny leaves early after receiving a text message. Before leaving, he gifts Frank a cellphone with a video recording. The video contains a message from Manny thanking Frank for everything he has done for him and how Frank has become a second father for him after his father died.

Manny meets with local drug cartel boss Adolfo Herrera, who confronts Manny for skimming his drug dealing profits. Adolfo's men attack Manny, but he successfully defends himself with his boxing moves. After turning his back to the gunmen to stare down Adolfo, Manny is stabbed from behind and killed.

Frank is notified of Manny’s death and is heartbroken. He later attends Manny's memorial at his home and comforts his mother Rosaria and little sister Julia. Rosaria asks Frank for help in finding Manny's killers, but Frank only gives her a vague reply. Back at his building, he and Bernie argue, but are then ambushed by armed robbers sent by Adolfo. Frank fends them off and saves Bernie. He later learns from a friend, LAPD Officer Malark, that Manny had narcotics on him, indicating he died from being involved in the illegal drug trade. The next morning, an enraged Frank tells his students that he will not tolerate drug dealing in his gym. He then talks to his student Tucson, Manny's friend, but Tucson denies knowing about Manny’s dealing. Suspicious, Frank follows Tucson to an apartment complex where he discreetly witnesses Tucson receive pills for distribution. Frank interrogates Tucson, who reveals Manny sold pills for a few months to support his family but was going to quit after his pro debut match.

Frank breaks into the dealers' apartment, assaults them, and burns their product, which results in Adolfo informing his father Leandro Herrera—an Argentinian diplomat and the local cartel leader—about Frank's actions. Now at home, a depressed Frank gets drunk after tearfully playing Manny's video again. He tries to wake Bernie to buy more alcohol, but Bernie doesn't answer which prompts Frank to leave. He is confronted by Adolfo's men, who taunt him by insulting Manny. Frank tries to defend himself, but his intoxication gives the cartel members the advantage. Before Frank is killed, Bernie overcomes his phobia and saves Frank by beating the men with a hockey stick. Frank tortures one of the gunmen for information, but only gets Adolfo's name.

Bernie gives Frank medical treatment for his wounds, and he opens up about his past. Bernie was a talented hockey player in the minor leagues whose dream was to be the first African-American to play in the National Hockey League. However, was forced to retire early due to an injury. He also developed a rare liver disease and was ineligible to be put on a donor list due to his age, giving him at most six months to live. Frank tells Bernie he wants to help him with the time he has left. Bernie accepts, and the two set out to find Adolfo.

Bernie takes Frank to his old Ford Bronco II, but it is broken down from years of neglect which forces them to use a city bus to get to the dealers' apartment. The place is deserted, so Frank decides to ask his friend Carmen, another LAPD officer, to give him Manny's personal items from the police station’s evidence room. She refuses at first, not wanting to risk her career, but Frank eventually convinces her to hand over Manny's property.

Frank and Bernie go through Manny’s contact list and locate his supplier 'Hammer' at his college dorm. After a brief fight, Frank tortures Hammer by using a fan on his genitals and interrogates him for Adolfo's whereabouts.

Soon after, Adolfo is informed by his right-hand man about Frank surviving the hit and Hammer’s torture. In retaliation, he blows up Frank and Bernie’s building, forcing them to stay with Rosaria in the meantime. Frank and Bernie use the information obtained from Hammer to find Adolfo at his vacation home. They break in and stab Adolfo in the eye with an ice pick. They force him to set up Leandro at a location where Frank makes a citizen’s arrest, though Leandro is unbothered by the situation. Frank informs Rosaria, who is happy about the outcome and the two become romantically involved.

Frank is jubilant about the arrest and having his insurance cover the repairs to the boxing gym, until Malark tells him Leandro has diplomatic immunity and can't be arrested without solid proof of his crimes. Furious, Frank and Bernie use a taxi to follow Leandro to a meat packing plant which Leandro is using as a front for his drug operation. They are caught, tortured, and left to die in a freezer until Frank uses a charm bracelet Julia gave to him to cut his and Bernie's bindings. They escape and travel by taxi to Rosaria's home, only to find she has been kidnapped by Adolfo. Julia tells Frank to use a tracker app on his phone she set up to find Rosaria. Before he and Bernie can rescue her, their taxi leaves due to their limited funds. Tucson then fortuitously arrives with Bernie's repaired truck.

Frank and Bernie set out to chase down Adolfo and his men. After surviving a shootout and shooting down a cartel helicopter, they capture Adolfo and force Leandro into a trade for Rosaria. Leandro agrees, and meets the two for the trade. During the exchange, Rosaria unsuccessfully attempts to warn Frank of a hidden gunman in Leandro’s vehicle. Just before Frank is killed, Bernie shoots the gunman with an old gun from the truck’s glove compartment that he previously thought was unusable. The rest of Leandro's men arrive, and he attempts to goad Frank into a fistfight while mentioning Manny’s name. Although, Leandro is dominant at first, Frank ruthlessly beats him to death. Police officers then arrive and arrest Adolfo and the gunmen.

Later, Frank hosts a party to celebrate defeating the Herreras, and he continues his romance with Rosario. Bernie spends time recovering from his successful surgery, having taken the dead Leandro's liver along with Hammer's girlfriend that he flirted with earlier.

== Cast ==
- Danny Trejo as Frank Vega
- Danny Glover as Bernie Pope
- Ignacio Serricchio as Adolfo Herrera
- Andrew Divoff as Leandro Herrera
- Jacqueline Obradors as Rosaria Parkes
- Jeremy Ray Valdez as Manny Parks
- Melany Ochoa as Julia Parks
- Charlie Carver as Eric
- Patrick Fabian as Officer Malark
- Loni Love as Carmen
- Jonathan Lipnicki as "Hammer"
- Leon Thomas III as Tucson
- Dante Basco as Gangly Asian
- Ryan Slater as Thin Caucasian
- Sarah Dumont as Jessica

== Reception ==
Kevin Carr of 7M Pictures said it was for fans of Danny Trejo only, and rated it 2.5 out of 5. Brian Orndorf of Blu-ray.com said it had less meme references than the first film and was more of a straight forward low budget action film.

== Sequel ==
The release date of the third installment of the franchise, titled Bad Asses on the Bayou, was announced in December 2014. The film was released in theatres on March 6, 2015.
