= The Charnel House (film) =

2016 film by Craig Moss

- Film poster
- Directed by: Craig Moss
- Written by: Chad Israel; Emanuel Isler
- Produced by: Sandra Siegal; Mark Benton Johnson
- Starring: Callum Blue; Nadine Velazquez; Makenzie Moss; Erik LaRay Harvey
- Cinematography: Paul Marschall
- Edited by: Josh Noyes
- Music by: Todd Haberman
- Production companies: Siegal Entertainment; MJ Films; Producer Capital Fund
- Distributed by: Freestyle Releasing
- Release date: November 4, 2016
- Running time: 90 minutes
- Country: United States
- Language: English

The Charnel House is a 2016 American supernatural horror dark fantasy film directed by Craig Moss and written by Chad Israel and Emanuel Isler. The film stars Callum Blue, Nadine Velazquez, Makenzie Moss, and Erik LaRay Harvey. It was released in theaters and on digital platforms on November 4, 2016, by Freestyle Releasing.

== Synopsis ==
A long abandoned slaughterhouse is transformed into modern lofts in a re-gentrified urban neighborhood. Soon after tenants move in, they are tormented by a dark secret that has been trapped in the building for over 30 years.

== Cast ==
- Callum Blue as Alex Reaves
- Nadine Velazquez as Charlotte Reaves
- Makenzie Moss as Mia Reaves
- Erik LaRay Harvey as Devin Pyles
- Alden Tab as Rupert
- Danielle Lauder as Emily Turner
- Andy Favreau as Jackson Davies
- Kate Linder as Aunt Rachel
- Neil Thackaberry as Blaine Cornish
- Joe Keery as Scott
- Patrick M. Walsh as Thomas Schect
- Neal Hodges as Devin's Father

== Production ==
On June 30, 2015, it was announced that Callum Blue and Nadine Velazquez would star opposite Makenzie Moss and Erik LaRay Harvey in the film, with Craig Moss directing from a screenplay by Emanuel Isler and Chad Israel. Producers Sandra Siegal and Mark Benton Johnson re-teamed after working together previously on Miss Meadows. The music was composed by Todd Haberman.

The film was shot in Cleveland, Ohio in 18 days.

== Reception ==
On the review aggregator website Rotten Tomatoes, 33% of 6 critics' reviews are positive, with an average rating of 4.9/10.

Noel Murray of the Los Angeles Times stated, "But while the cast is talented and the tone is classy, The Charnel House never develops any momentum. The movie puts fright on the back burner to tease out a mystery that proves to be too profoundly idiotic to be worth all the bother." Tom Keogh of The Seattle Times gave the film 2 stars out of 4 and observed that it "moves along fairly briskly, drawing on bits of inspiration from The Shining and Poltergeist, while adding an interesting twist to a doppelgänger theme." Maitland McDonagh of Film Journal International wrote, "The Charnel House doesn't break any conspicuously new ground, but the setting is distinctive and writers Emanuel Isler and Chad Israel make good use of the idea that the building's pervasive tech is also a portal to the kind of otherworldly things." Aaron B. Peterson of The Hollywood Outsider described the film as "an intriguing thriller with a novel concept, carried forward by a bold and focused performance from its lead."
