= The 41-Year-Old Virgin Who Knocked Up Sarah Marshall and Felt Superbad About It =

2010 American parody film

- Directed by: Craig Moss
- Written by: Craig Moss
- Produced by: Jim Busfield; Craig Moss; Ash R. Shah
- Starring: Bryan Callen; Mircea Monroe; Noureen DeWulf; Stephen Kramer Glickman; Austin Michael Scott
- Cinematography: Andrew Strahorn
- Edited by: Michel Aller
- Music by: Todd Haberman
- Production company: Silver Nitrate
- Distributed by: 20th Century Fox Home Entertainment
- Release date: June 8, 2010
- Running time: 82 minutes
- Country: United States
- Language: English
- Budget: $1.3 million

The 41-Year-Old Virgin Who Knocked Up Sarah Marshall and Felt Superbad About It is a 2010 American parody film that spoofs several of Judd Apatow's films: The 40-Year-Old Virgin, Knocked Up, Superbad, and Forgetting Sarah Marshall. The main plot follows Andy Spitzer (Bryan Callen), a 41-year-old who desperately wants to lose his virginity, along with his teenage roommates who have similar goals.

According to producer and director Craig Moss, the original title was much longer, "more of a paragraph", and had to be cut down to the final version. On set, the film was called Slumdog Virgin, a reference to a spoof of Slumdog Millionaire included in the film.

The film was released direct-to-DVD by 20th Century Fox Home Entertainment on June 8, 2010.

== Plot ==
Andy Spitzer is a 41-year-old virgin who lives with his "high school age" friends Seth, Sanjay, Jonah and Michael. He works part-time at a club as a failed standup comedian with his friend Blaqguy, who suffers from Benjamin Button's Disease. Seemingly oblivious to any attempts by women to sleep with him, he has remained a virgin and has not even masturbated, much to the chagrin of Blaqguy.

One night at the club, he meets Kim and seems to hit it off with her but she receives a promotion and leaves abruptly, leaving behind her false leg. Later that night over a poker game, his friends learn of Andy's lifelong virginity and attempt to help him lose it by various means, all of which fail spectacularly.

Andy later meets Sarah Marshall, who immediately takes a liking to him despite his awkward nature. After vomiting in his car, she attempts to sleep with him but he loses his confidence and flees. Confronted by Seth, Andy regains his confidence and returns to Sarah but discovers Blaqguy, now in his pubescent stage, sleeping with Sarah. A fight breaks out between them, which ends with Andy covered in feces. The next day, Sarah arrives at Andy's apartment fully pregnant (due to her being half Mexican), claiming that the child is Andy's. He denies it and she leaves him.

Seeking respite from his woes, Andy goes on vacation to Hawaii, where he reconnects with Kim, who is now manager at his hotel. Andy discovers that Sarah and her new boyfriend, Aldus Snow, are staying in the room adjacent to his. Once again denying the baby is his, Sarah and Aldus have loud sex in an attempt to get Andy jealous.

That night, Andy goes on a date with Kim and when they attempt to have sex, Sarah interrupts and a fight breaks out. Sarah and Kim both subsequently leave Andy. After a brief encounter with Mace Windu and Yoda, Andy learns that virginity allows him to live longer and gain control of the force but rejects it after learning his scrotum will inflate in size.

Andy reconciles with Kim after being struck by a car and they are married soon after. On their wedding night, they finally have sex but Andy's semen has backed up with such force that he ejects Kim through a window when he climaxes, subsequently putting out wildfires in California, flooding Louisiana, and thwarting a missile attack by Kim Jong il.

A subplot involving Jonah, Michael and their friend McAnalovin' also occurs throughout the course of the movie. After being picked up by police officers Beat and Yo' Ass for using a false ID to acquire alcohol, McAnalovin' goes on a Grand Theft Auto IV-style adventure that unwittingly unleashes an army of Mexicans upon himself and the officers. Jonah becomes separated and is accused of being a pedophile after an encounter with Chris Hansen. The two eventually regroup and manage to drive to Hawaii in the car that strikes Andy but are both killed by the Mexicans. Michael, meanwhile, has fallen in with a group of lactose-intolerant vampires led by Edward Cullen.

== Cast ==
- Bryan Callen as Andy Spitzer
- Mircea Monroe as Sarah Marshall
- Noureen DeWulf as Kim
- Stephen Kramer Glickman as Seth
- Austin Michael Scott as McAnalovin'
- Steven Sims as Jonah
- Steven Nicholas as Michael
- Alissa Kramer as Melissa Twin
- Heidi Kramer as Haley Twin
- Melissa Villaseñor as Sara
- Chris Spencer as Officer Beat
- Randall Park as Officer Yo' Ass
- Frank Maharajh as Sanjay
- J.R. Starr as Blaqguy (age 85)
  - Duane R. Shepard, Sr. as Blaqguy (age 60)
  - Neil Lewis as Blaqguy (ages 40-30)
  - Marque Richardson as Blaqguy (ages 20-16)
  - Shamari Maurice as Blaqguy (age 12)
  - Terrell Ransom, Jr. as Blaqguy (age 6)
- Eric Tiede as Aldus Snow
- Matt Crabtree as Verizon Guy
- David Ury as Yes Man
- J. Chris Newberg as Singer / Guitarist

== Reception ==
R. L. Shaffer of IGN called it "a painful, unfunny, unoriginal, sloppy mess of a movie", while Brad McKay of Collider stated, "It’s not funny or entertaining." Brian Orndorf of DVD Talk recommended that his readers not "give Craig Moss your time or your money. Watch coverage of the BP oil disaster instead. I guarantee it's funnier."
