= Let Us In =

2021 horror film directed by Craig Moss

- Official release poster
- Directed by: Craig Moss
- Written by: JW Callero; Craig Moss
- Produced by: Craig Moss
- Starring: Makenzie Moss; Sadie Stanley; Mackenzie Ziegler; O'Neill Monahan; Siena Agudong; Tobin Bell
- Cinematography: Rudy Harbon
- Edited by: Josh Noyes
- Music by: Todd Haberman
- Production company: Just Wanna Make Movies
- Distributed by: Samuel Goldwyn Films
- Release date: July 2, 2021
- Running time: 79 minutes
- Country: United States
- Language: English

Let Us In is a 2021 American family science fiction-horror film written and directed by Craig Moss and starring Makenzie Moss, Sadie Stanley, Mackenzie Ziegler, O'Neill Monahan, Siena Agudong, and Tobin Bell. The film is about an outcast twelve-year-old girl and her nine-year-old best friend learning about a lot of teenager abductions in their town and stepping in to figure out what's going on that involved hoodie-wearing black-eyed individuals.

The film was released on July 2, 2021 and it received negative-to-mixed critical reviews.

== Plot ==
A young teen couple is surrounded in a forest at night by teenagers in black hoodies and all-black eyes asking to be "let in". They break the boyfriend's arm and chase the girlfriend around, finally breaking her leg and forcing her to agree to "let them in". They go missing.

12-year-old Emily lives with her busy, uninvolved parents and spirited grandmother. At school, it is revealed that Emily is a bullied outcast as they imply she killed someone. Scarlett, the queen bee, purposely doesn't invite Emily to her party. Emily catches the glare of "Mean Mr. Munch" on the way home.

Emily's only friend Christopher, a believer in extraterrestrials, invites her to his house to make contact with aliens. That night, Emily is alone at her house. A knock at the front door reveals five hoodie-wearing, black-eyed individuals who ask for her to let them in. She calls 911 and hides in an upstairs bathroom, but the hooded people smash the skylight above the tub and chase her outside as the police arrive. The sheriff tells Emily's dad, Mark, that the skylight was intact and there were no signs of intruders. He thinks that possibly some kids picking on her are to blame.

On the night of the party, Christopher's kind, older sister, Jessie, invites Emily to attend. She ends up playing truth-or-dare with Scarlett and her crew, where they end up insulting her for "killing someone", so she leaves. While outside, she catches the stare of Mr. Munch again. While on the toilet, Bianca encounters three hooded people with sunglasses on. When she freaks out after one caresses her, they knock her out by punching her.

Emily is in a therapy session trying to cope with an unexplained death. Not much is revealed except that she believes it was her fault as her therapist attempts to dissuade her otherwise. At school, Emily hears Bianca has gone missing. That night, Harold Lutz, a journalist with the Times, comes knocking at the door to report on the missing people.

Emily experiences a flashback nightmare that reveals her making a "besties" pact with someone before jumping off the roof into a pool. Her friend jumps in and Emily is awakened after her friend hits the water with a crack. At Christopher's house, they attempt to make contact with aliens through their homemade communication device before it's cut off abruptly. Emily tries to convince Christopher that they should cut their losses while Christopher pleads with her to have faith. As Emily opens the door to leave, they hear noises. Excited, Emily attempts to make contact and speak to the mystery extraterrestrials as they repeat the kids' names and the word Jungspar. The power suddenly goes out and cuts off communication.

At work, Jessie is closing up for the night and encounters the hooded teenagers asking to be let in. She refuses and they somehow break into the store. As she tries to escape, they disappear and Jessie locks herself in a supply closet to call for help. The hooded assailants trick her by sounding like her boyfriend, Tobey, to open the door. Jessie fights back as much as she can until they corner her, break her leg, and force her to "let them in".

Christopher and his mom realize Jessie hasn't come home from work yet, but his mom thinks she's snuck off to be with her boyfriend. Using a tracker, Christopher, his mom, and Emily realize Jessie is still at work, so they head there to check on her. They break in through the back door and realize a struggle has taken place. As Emily searches the store by herself, cops arrive. The next day, Christopher and Emily visit Harold to gather more information, with Christopher's sister being the seventh one that week. Harold has done some research and has come across only one other account of the "black-eyed kids" from 50 years ago, when there were over 25 disappearances with only one survivor: the elderly man, Frederick Munch. Emily and Christopher visit Mr. Munch's house and struggle to get him to help through his intercom. When Emily mentions Christopher's sister has been taken, he finally lets them in to the old and creepy house.

Mr. Munch claims he has been too scared to talk about the black-eyed kids for the last 50 years until the recent kidnappings started up again. He reveals they took his fiancée, but let him live, and took her through a portal that connects to outer space. Mr. Munch tells the kids that these alien-like humanoids refer to themselves as Jungspars. Mr. Munch has been doing research over the years and has figured out the Jungspar come to earth every 20 years to abduct adolescent girls and boys during their harvesting time to bring them back to their planet and force the abducted into slavery. Mr. Munch has seen the horrors of their planet and reveals they are required to get permission to abduct someone, and will do whatever and take however long it takes to force someone to say "yes". The pain endured while saying "no" to them is nothing compared to the pain endured when one says "yes", so no matter what happens, never say "yes". Christopher tries to make contact with the extraterrestrials through his homemade device, but suffers a couple setbacks when the power goes out. The aliens reveal themselves as Kluuk and ask Emily to beat the Jungspars by "shine the light".

Emily and Christopher go out into the forest at night and wait for the Jungspar to appear with no luck. They hear some noise and figures appear: Scarlett, Tobey, and others who have lost people to the Jungspar, all ready and willing to help get everyone back. Emily lures the aliens to the forest again as they ask for everyone to let them in. The group shines flashlights to scare them off, but they come back and chase the kids through the dark forest. Emily and Christopher lure them towards a car trap where the lights get turned on and force the Jungspar on the ground in agony, but another Jungspar sneaks up on them and takes out the kids in the cars and turns off the lights. As a result, Christopher and Scarlett are taken, leaving Emily and Tobey as the lone survivors. Back at home, the police force Emily to stay home as she pleads with them to let her go and that they're running out of time to save the ones abducted. Christopher's phone pings, but Emily is unable to leave her house due to police guarding her and preventing her from leaving. Her nana helps her escape by providing a distraction and Emily heads towards the location of Christopher's phone. Harold spots her scootering down the street and follows her to help out. They arrive at the spot where Christopher's phone pinged, but find nothing until a lone Jungspar jumps into a hole nearby.

Emily and Harold jump in to explore the cave and find the alien typing in a code in a tablet to trap the kidnapped kids in a blue-laser jail cell. Harold lures the Jungspar towards him before shining light to put him out. Emily finds all the missing kids from the entire week and tries to put the code in, which doesn't work. So, Harold smashes the tablet and frees them. However, Christopher and some other kids are not with the group and Jessie reveals they're going to send them somewhere else. Emily saves Christopher just as they're about to shove him through a portal, but a Jungspar sneaks up behind her and takes her flashlight. Cornered, Emily uses the whistle from Mr. Munch, which creates a sound that incapacitates the aliens. Emily sees a vision of Rachel, the friend who died that everyone's been calling her a murderer for, telling Emily her death was all an accident. Rachel asks Emily to take her hand, so they can play together again, but it turns out to be a Jungspar. It asks Emily if she'll let them in and threatens her, but she refuses and kicks it through the portal. As Emily finds herself cornered, the kids arrive with flashlights and throw the Jungspar through the portal. Christopher and Emily hug.

One week later, Emily's family and Christopher are packing their stuff to leave for Cape Canaveral as Jessie and Tobey come to see them off. Mr. Munch nods at them as they pass. While driving through the city, the kids are greeted with the townspeople cheering them on as "local heroes" as they leave for bringing all the missing kids back.

Mr. Munch goes to his bathroom as he pulls out his contacts, revealing his eyes to be black underneath leaving it ambiguous on if he was a Jungspar all this time or was turned into one.

== Cast ==
- Makenzie Moss as Emily Sparks
- Sadie Stanley as Jessie
- O'Neill Monahan as Christopher
- Siena Agudong as Scarlett
- Tobin Bell as Frederick Munch
- Heather Ann Gottlieb as Tlat
- Lauren Stamile as Michelle
- Seneca Paliotta as Bianca
- Mather Zickel as Harold Lutz
- Judy Geeson Edie
- Olivia Moss as Stassi
- Brandon Soo Hoo as Luke
- Darin Heames as Bisquick
- Dan Sachoff as Nels Peterson
- Yasmeen Fletcher as Carly
- Flor De Maria Chahua as Carly's Mom
- Joe Flanigan as Officer Wilton
- Aden Bertisch as Aden
- Evan Bertisch as Danielle
- Mackenzie Ziegler as Ivy
- Chris Gartin as Mark Sparks
- Conor Husting as Tobey
- Eric Callero as Mr. Jayo
- Sky Alexis as Rachel
- Heidi Kramer as Carol Sparks
- Kimberly Blair as Mrs. Danner
- Emily Rued as Dr. Kemp
- Andreas Orrego as Rolf
- Aiden Bertisch as Aden

== Release ==
The film was released direct to VOD in the United States on July 2, 2021.

== Reception ==
On review aggregator website Rotten Tomatoes, the film holds an approval rating of 20% based on 10 reviews, with an average rating of 4.20/10. On Metacritic the film has an average score of 56 out of 100 based on 4 reviews indicating "mixed or average" reviews.

While Jeannette Catsoulis of The New York Times gave the film one of only two positive reviews, stating that it had "a guileless warmth that drew my good will", Daniel Goodwin of Starburst reflected the majority, noting it was "a bland and weary hotchpotch of derivative ideas and cheap VFX."
