= Craig Moss =

American screenwriter and director

- Born: United States
- Occupation(s): Writer, director
- Years active: 1998–present
- Style: Parody; comedy; action; horror

Craig Moss is an American film director, writer and actor known for making parody, action and horror films. His films include The 41-Year-Old Virgin Who Knocked Up Sarah Marshall and Felt Superbad About It, Bad Ass, and its sequels, Bad Ass 2: Bad Asses and Bad Asses on the Bayou.

Moss graduated from University of California (Los Angeles), and he is an owner of a film production company Spotfellas.

== Filmography ==
Year	Title	Director	Producer	Writer	Actor	Role	Notes
1998	Saving Ryan's Privates	Yes					Short film
2010	The 41-Year-Old Virgin Who Knocked; Up Sarah Marshall and Felt Superbad About It	Yes	Yes	Yes			
2012	Breaking Wind	Yes	Yes	Yes			
2012	Bad Ass	Yes		Yes	Yes	Generous Bus Driver	
2013	30 Nights of Paranormal Activity with the Devil Inside the Girl with the Dragon Tattoo	Yes		Yes	Yes	Director	
2014	Bad Ass 2: Bad Asses	Yes		Yes			Straight-to-DVD sequel to Bad Ass
2015	Bad Asses on the Bayou	Yes		Yes			
2016	911 Nightmare	Yes					
2016	Nightmare Nurse	Yes					
2016	The Charnel House	Yes	Yes				
2021	Let Us In	Yes	Yes	Yes			
2023	Binged to Death	Yes		Yes			
