= Breaking Wind =

2012 American parody film

- Directed by: Craig Moss
- Written by: Craig Moss
- Produced by: Bernie Gewissler; Craig Moss
- Starring: Heather Ann Davis; Eric Callero; Frank Pacheco; Emma Bell; Danny Trejo
- Cinematography: Rudy Harbon
- Edited by: Austin Michael Scott
- Music by: Todd Haberman
- Production company: Primary Pictures
- Distributed by: Lionsgate Home Entertainment
- Release date: January 13, 2012
- Running time: 82 minutes
- Country: United States
- Language: English

Breaking Wind is a 2012 American comedy horror parody film, directed by Craig Moss and based on the Twilight film series, specifically Eclipse. It stars Heather Ann Davis, Eric Callero, Frank Pacheco and Danny Trejo. Distributed by Lionsgate Home Entertainment, which became a sister company to Twilight studio Summit Entertainment in 2012, it wound up released only on DVD in the United States.

== Plot ==
One night, a young man named Ronald is attacked by an unseen assailant, and during the course of the attack he loses his shirt, then one of his teeth, and gains a tattoo. Finally, he's bitten on his buttocks, which causes him to begin transforming into a vampire and incessantly break wind.

A year later, Bella asks her boyfriend Edward Colon to transform her into a vampire, but he insists that he marry her first. Bella also has to deal with the affections of Jacob, a member of a pack of overweight, flatulent werewolves (who oddly never transforms). One night, Edward gets a vision of Ronald breaking into Bella's room, and brings her to the Colon family home for help, but they are unsure of what to do. Jacob then takes her to meet his grandfather, who recounts the time that he faced an ancient evil that manifested itself as "different characters all played the exact same way" (a stab at Johnny Depp and his performances as Jack Sparrow, Edward Scissorhands, Willy Wonka and The Mad Hatter), and believes that a similar incident is about to occur. With this information and a recent spate of people going missing, the Colons are able to deduce that a rogue vampire is creating an army of newborns (or "noobs").

The army turns out to be under the control of Victoria, who tricks Ronald into believing Edward killed Gary Coleman and killing Bella will avenge him. The noobs get Bella's scent from a pornographic magazine, and the Colons realize that they cannot protect her, especially because of Rosalie's homicidal rages toward her and Carlisle's inability to stop himself from drinking her blood. She seeks refuge with her flamboyantly homosexual father Charlie, but soon realizes that she cannot stay with him either, due to his insistence in graphically describing his sex acts and holding orgies at his house. Eventually, Edward works out a compromise with Jacob, who takes Bella to safety and uses his flatulence to mask her scent.

That night, Edward meets with Bella and Jacob and the three spend the night in a tent, where Jacob has sex with Bella as an oblivious Edward talks about how he thinks he and Jacob could be friends if they put their differences aside. The following morning the noobs catch up with the trio, but the Colons and Jacob's pack also arrive, and a fight ensues. Bella distracts the noobs by eating a special cake given to her by Jacob, which causes her to experience severe flatulence and creates a smell bad enough to distract Victoria and the noobs long enough for the Colons to kill them all. Bella agrees to marry Edward, while Jacob accidentally ends up stabbing himself to death during a fight with a TMZ reporter.

A year later a pregnant Bella learns a dwarf-like copy of Edward (who had been hitting on her throughout the film, despite her obvious disgust) somehow fathered the child instead.

The movie then ends by parodying the trailer to Breaking Dawn – Part 1, followed by a segment ridiculing the reactions to said trailer (in the form of YouTube videos) by certain "Twi-Hard" fans of the series.

== Cast ==
- Heather Ann Davis as Bella
- Eric Callero as Edward
- Frank Pacheco as Jacob
- Flip Schultz as Charlie
- Michael Hamilton as Ronald (parodying Riley Byers)
- Danny Trejo as Billy Black, Jacob's Grandfather
- Kelsey Collins as Victoria (parodying Bryce Dallas Howard’s portrayal in Eclipse)
- John Stevenson as Carlisle
- Peter Gilroy as Jasper
- Emma Bell as Rosalie (uncredited)

== Reception ==
Breaking Wind was met with negative reviews, mostly comparing it unfavorably to a similar Twilight parody, Vampires Suck, which was already panned. Edward Lawrenson of Time Out declared that "nothing prepares you for the ineptness and crassness of this ‘Twilight’ parody". The A.V. Club reviewed the film and its audio commentary track on the "Commentary Tracks of the Damned" section.
