= The Bus Uncle =

2006 Hong Kong Cantonese viral video

- Screenshot
- Release date: May 2006
- Country: Hong Kong
Language
Cantonese
The Bus Uncle
- Chinese: 巴士阿叔
Transcriptions
Standard Mandarin
- Hanyu Pinyin: Bā'shì Ā shū
Yue: Cantonese
- Jyutping: Baa^{1} si^{2} aa^{3} suk^{1}

The Bus Uncle is a Hong Kong Cantonese viral video depicting a verbal altercation between two men aboard a KMB bus in Hong Kong on 27 April 2006. The older and more belligerent of the two men was quickly nicknamed the "Bus Uncle", from the common Hong Kong practice of referring to older men as "Uncle" (阿叔). The altercation was recorded by a nearby passenger and uploaded to the Hong Kong Golden Forum, YouTube, and Google Video. The video became YouTube's most viewed video in May 2006, attracting viewers with the Bus Uncle's rhetorical outbursts and copious use of profanity, receiving 1.7 million hits in the first 3 weeks of that month.

The video became a cultural sensation in Hong Kong, sparking debate and discussion on lifestyle, etiquette, civic awareness and media ethics within the city, and attracted the attention from media outlets around the world.

== Incident ==
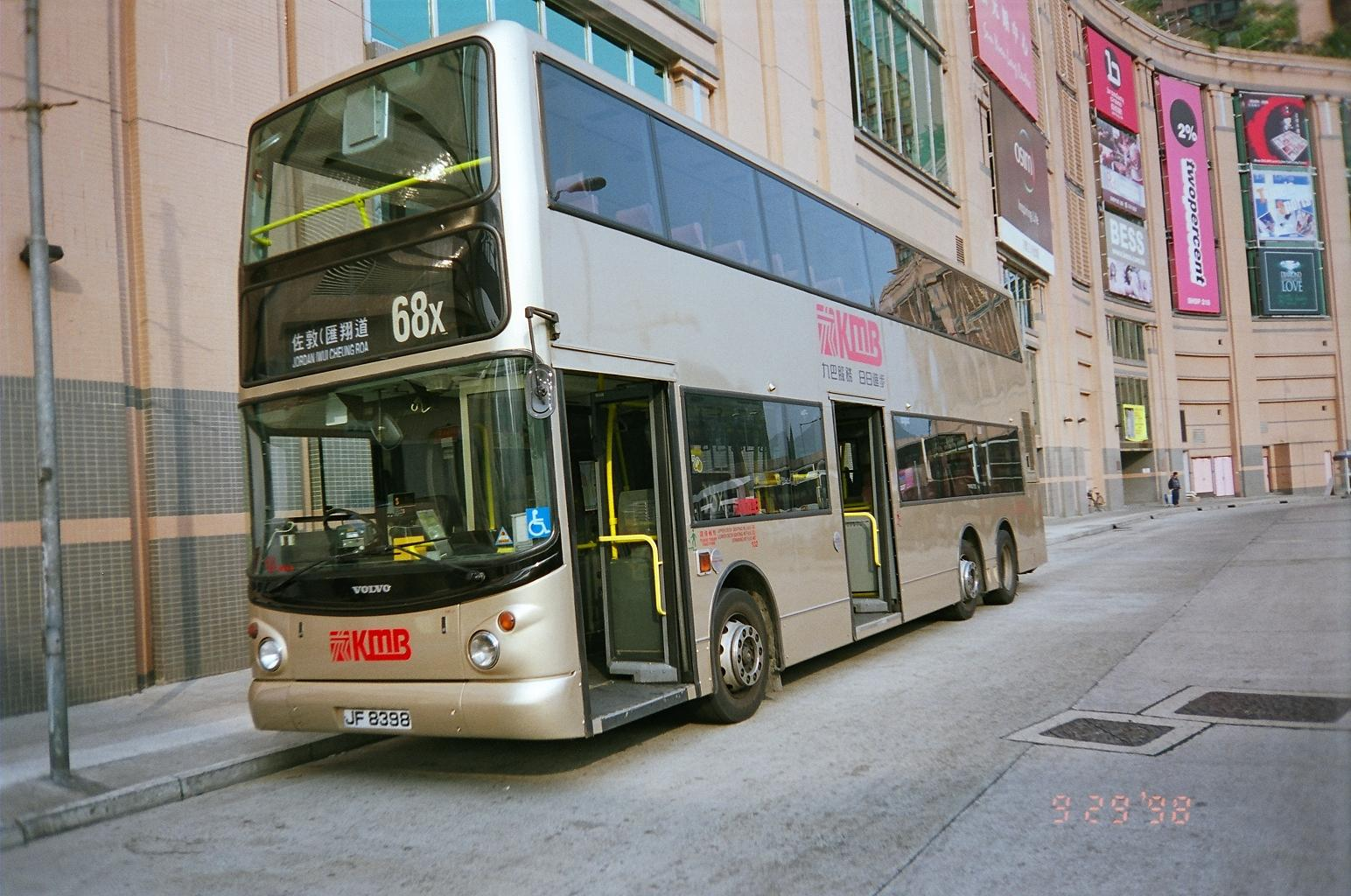
The incident took place on a Kowloon Motor Bus route 68X bus.

The incident took place at approximately 11 p.m. on 27 April 2006 on the upper deck of a Kowloon Motor Bus double-decker bus operating route 68X, en route to Yuen Long, Hong Kong.

It began when a young bespectacled male passenger tapped the shoulder of a middle-aged man in front of him who was chatting on his mobile phone, asking the man to lower his voice. The older man later claimed that when he was tapped on the shoulder, he was under stress from an argument with his girlfriend and was calling the Samaritans. However, the younger man said that he was in fact merely chatting with friends. The older man turned around and started a monologue, ranting about being unnecessarily provoked under stress. The younger man, who seldom talked back, expressed a desire to end the discussion. However, the middle-aged man insisted that the matter was not settled and requested an apology from him. The younger man apologised, reluctantly shook hands, but also warned the older man regarding the use of maternal insults. This last warning resulted in more profanities from the older man. The video ends with the older man receiving a phone call.

== Video ==
The video was filmed by a 21-year-old accountant and part-time psychology student Jon Fong Wing Hang (Chinese: 方穎恆; pinyin: Fāng Yǐnghéng; Jyutping: fong1 wing6 hang4). In a radio station phone-in, Fong stated that he recorded the incident in case the abusive man became violent. He claimed there was a second video yet to be posted online in which the younger man fought back by making fun of "Bus Uncle" with a friend on the phone. However, Fong told reporters that he "often takes videos as a hobby, and had just planned to share this one with friends." The video clip has English subtitles which, while erroneous in parts, never stray far from the general tenor of the Cantonese version.

The "Bus Uncle" title for the video was coined by members of an Internet forum in reference to the older man in the video. In Hong Kong, it is common to refer to an older man as "Uncle" (阿叔), hence the English translation "The Bus Uncle". Lam's name appears as part of the title of the original video. Contrary to reports in Western media, the word "Uncle" (阿叔) was not used.

On 28 May 2006, this incident was mentioned on the main evening news on TVB, as well as Cable TV news. News of the video clip later reached Western media and was widely syndicated and has received coverage from Channel NewsAsia, CNN, and The Wall Street Journal.

== Participants ==
Reporters later identified the "Bus Uncle" as Roger Chan Yuet Tung (Chinese: 陳乙東; Jyutping: can4 jyut3 dung1), a 51-year-old restaurant worker who lived in Yuen Long. On 23 May 2006, 23-year-old property agent Elvis Ho Yui Hei (Chinese: 何銳熙; Jyutping: ho4 jeoi6 hei1), previously misidentified as "Alvin" or "Elvin" called a talk show on Commercial Radio Hong Kong claiming to be the young man involved in the argument.

Elvis Ho regularly commuted home from work on the bus and reported that he often asked passengers to lower their voices so he could sleep during his trip. Ho said he forgave "Bus Uncle" and sympathized with whatever stress the older man was suffering from. He said his patience throughout the ordeal was inspired by tai chi.

Roger Chan lived alone and spent most of his adult life estranged from his family. The sudden exposure and negative media attention led many of his family members to change their phone numbers and further distance themselves from him. In an interview he did with Next Magazine, neighbours reported that they often hear him speaking loudly on the phone and they found him erratic and emotional. Among the many details he shared with the magazine he stated that he once won the lottery, but due to a gambling problem he also ended up heavily in debt to thugs. Consequently, he was incarcerated in Belgium after being caught smuggling heroin where he learned to create fruit sculptures. He had an inconsistent work history and spent long stretches unemployed. He received public benefits and financial support from his elderly mother. After his identity was revealed, Chan was criticized for reportedly demanding money for interviews.

== Aftermath ==
Elvis Ho expels Roger Chan and the press, rejecting the press-arranged meeting and demanding all reporters to hand over their business cards.

Sing Tao Daily reported that Chan visited Ho's office on 31 May 2006 in Mong Kok to apologize for the dispute and to initiate a business proposal for the duo to hold a "Bus Uncle Rave Party". Chan was quickly rejected and expelled by Ho, who expressed outrage towards the journalists who arranged the meeting and threatened legal action against the press.

Ming Pao opined that the use of profanity by the "Bus Uncle" and threatening behavior theoretically contravened the general code of conduct of bus passengers, and that he had violated two public order laws – Section 46(1)(a), (n)(ii) and 57(1) of the Road Traffic (Public Service Vehicles) Regulations, and Section 17B(2) of the Public Order Ordinance – which potentially carried financial penalties and imprisonment.

Next Magazine journalists interviewed Chan at his home in Yuen Long, and his interview became the magazine's cover story on 1 June 2006. On 7 June 2006, Chan, who had been hired as a Public Relations officer in the Steak Expert restaurant chain, was physically assaulted at work by three unidentified masked men who then fled the scene. Chan sustained severe injuries to his eyes and face and was admitted to the emergency department for treatment. The restaurant owner, Mr. Lee, was later pressured by his wife and daughter to fire Chan after magazine allegations emerged of Chan's exploits in a Shenzhen karaoke hostess bar. Chan resigned after the owner's wife attempted to overdose on medication, ostensibly in an effort to force the issue.

== Social influence ==
=== Effects on popular culture ===
Some of Chan's quotes were later frequently used, mimicked, and parodied in Hong Kong, particularly by teenagers. 「你有壓力，我有壓力」("You have stress, I have stress"), 「未解決！」("It's not settled!") have become catchphrases on Internet forums, posters, and radio programmes. Various remixes have been created of the video, including pop, karaoke, rap, dance and disco remixes. There have also been parodies of an apology, "re-enactments" of the incident with video game characters, composite pictures, movie posters, and versions featuring Darth Vader and Adagio for Strings. According to researcher Donna Chu, many of these videos referenced other local popular culture and had jovial, sarcastic tones, stating that "The collective behaviors in YouTube suggest that this hugely popular video-sharing site takes on the roles as public space, a playground and a cultural public sphere." Merchandise such as cartoon T-shirts and mobile phone ringtones have also been produced and sold on the Internet.

In June 2006, TVB produced an advertisement parodying the Bus Uncle video promoting its coverage of the 2006 FIFA World Cup which featured TVB sports commentator Lam Sheung Yee (林尚義), whose voice resembles Chan's, on a bus playing the role of the Bus Uncle. In the advertisement, a passenger sitting behind Lam Sheung Yee (played by Lam Man Chung) questions whether Lam Sheung Yee feels pressured for his responsibilities in the upcoming World Cup, which would be his last TV appearance before retirement. Turning around, Lam replies that there is no pressure and emphasises the issue (i.e. the viewers' demand for World Cup coverage) has been resolved. The passenger then offers to shake hands with Lam Sheung Yee, calling for a truce. Sitcoms produced by ATV and TVB have also referenced the video in argument scenes. In episode 67 of the TVB sitcom Welcome to the House (高朋滿座), the young bespectacled main character tried to stop a man from talking too loudly on the mobile phone in the cinema. As a result, he was harshly rebuked by the man. Once his family knew about the incident from a video uploaded on the Internet, they taught the character to be more assertive and not to allow himself to be bullied. In the end, he was able to stand up to the same man when they met again in the cinema and remove him from the premises.

In 2021, South China Morning Post referred to The Bus Uncle as one of the best memes that originated from Hong Kong.

=== Stress in Hong Kong ===
Although many found the video humorous and entertaining, others warned that it hinted at a more alarming and sinister prognosis of life in stress-filled Hong Kong and other overcrowded areas. Lee Sing, director of the Hong Kong Mood Disorders Centre at the Chinese University of Hong Kong, warned that Hong Kong's high-stress working environments are spawning a city-full of "Bus Uncles". Lee estimated that one of every 50 Hongkongers suffers from intermittent explosive disorder, turning one into a "ticking time bomb" of rage and violence.

Journalism professor and Internet expert Anthony Fung Ying-him also attributed the popularity of the low-resolution video of a "trivial event" to the emotional climate of the city. While other viral videos are favoured by specific demographics, this one spread widely due to its universal expression of "the true feelings of ordinary people."

On the other hand, Ho Kwok Leung, an applied social science lecturer at the Hong Kong Polytechnic University, held that attention surrounding the video reflected the boring lives of Hong Kong people. With few interesting topics to discuss, they savour the pleasure of spreading information to a vast audience and the creation of Internet memes. Furthermore, the banning of the use of some video catchphrases in certain schools made the incident more appealing. This lifestyle, according to Leung, is fertile ground for the cultivation of a "video clip culture".

=== Civic awareness concerns ===
Ah Nong (阿濃, J: aa3 nung4, P: Ā Nóng), a popular literary figure and artist in Hong Kong, believed that the incident highlighted the apathy of the common Hong Kong people. He emphasised that during the heated exchange between Chan and Ho, not a single bystander came to Ho's aid. He recalled an incident a few years back where he confronted a man smoking on the lower deck of a bus and was scolded for the rest of the journey. He said it was useless to complain to the bus driver who would not bother to waste his time, let alone the other passengers. Ah Nong argued that in such a society, a person can be accused of wrongdoing despite good intentions.

There was support for Ho's desire for a lower volume as well as sympathy for the stress felt by the "Bus Uncle." Others maintained that Chan's actions were atypical of etiquette in Hong Kong. Apple Tse Ho Yi, minister of the Hong Kong Christian Service, carried out a survey of 506 students over the age of 12 following the incident. Of the respondents who claim they regularly encountered people speaking loudly on the phone on buses, only 47% said they would intervene by talking to the phone user or alerting the driver. Reasons for inaction include fear, apathy and inability to solve the problem. On civic awareness, the majority of the respondents did not consider chatting loudly on the phone to be wrong. Tse concluded that the current generation of Hong Kong young people have poor civic awareness, and it is natural that disputes often occur due to inconsideration. Speaking about the incident on Commercial Radio, Journalist Chip Tsao described Chan's behaviour as "noise raping" and said that the incident was a manifestation of underlying social tension as well as the mindset of a "common Hongkonger". He criticised Ho as being a stereotype of present-day Hong Kong youth – speechless and too weak.

Chan's placement as runner-up "Person of the Year" announced by Radio Television Hong Kong was seen by Michael DeGolyer of the Hong Kong Standard that it might have struck a chord with the general population. Ng Fung Sheung, a social science lecturer of the City University of Hong Kong, explained that Hong Kong people tend to chat loudly in public places. She attributed this phenomenon to the television screens found in many vehicles and trains, which broadcast programmes at high volumes. She suggested that the government should provide better civic education for the public to make them more considerate of others. When it comes to schools which banned the usage of catch phrases like "I'm stressed!" Ng stated that teachers must be able to distinguish whether the students really face pressure or are simply following the trend, and provide guidance if necessary.

=== Criticism of media ethics ===
Some denied that any social insight could be gleaned from the video clip, arguing that the frenzy was artificially created by sensationalist newspapers to boost circulation and profits. Clement So York-kee, Director of the School of Journalism at the Chinese University of Hong Kong, warned that methods to uncover the incident between Chan and Ho "did not seem to ... [involve the] traditional practice of news reporting." For example, several media outlets offered rewards on unmasking Bus Uncle's identity. In late May 2006, a group of journalists and photographers initiated and followed Chan's second meeting with Ho. After Ho's refusal, they brought Bus Uncle to a dinner and karaoke session. Although the session was widely reported, many believed it was artificially created news and unworthy of front-page attention.

Ta Kung Pao stated that the Bus Uncle incident tested the professionalism of the Hong Kong mass media, its editorial noting that Chan sought payment for interviews and made many extraordinary claims about himself which were published without verification. The editorial concluded by advising journalists not to fabricate news, but instead to emphasise the verifiability of stories and consider carefully whether an incident is newsworthy.

Others held that the frenzy was not the product of a media conspiracy, but rather a reflection of the public's curiosity and Hong Kong's competitive consumer-driven media market. The situation also allowed camera phone marketers to highlight the potential comedic value and draw attention away from privacy concerns.

In the aftermath, other videos featuring similar public outbursts were published, including a video depicting a female at Hong Kong International Airport who became hysterical after missing her flight which was viewed 750,000 times in five days.

== See also ==
- AC Transit bus fight – Another viral video of an altercation on a bus
