= Bad Asses on the Bayou =

2015 American action film

- DVD cover
- Directed by: Craig Moss
- Written by: Craig Moss
- Produced by: Ash R. Shah; Ben Feingold; Jim Busfield
- Starring: Danny Trejo; Danny Glover; John Amos; Loni Love; Sammi Rotibi; Jimmy Bennett
- Cinematography: Paul Marschall
- Edited by: Josh Noyes
- Music by: Todd Haberman
- Production companies: Sense and Sensibility Ventures; Silver Nitrate
- Distributed by: 20th Century Fox Home Entertainment; The Samuel Goldwyn Company
- Release date: March 6, 2015
- Running time: 85 minutes
- Country: United States
- Language: English

Bad Asses on the Bayou (also known as Bad Ass 3) is a 2015 American action film starring Danny Trejo and Danny Glover, written and directed by Craig Moss. The film is the third and final part of the Bad Ass trilogy.

== Plot synopsis ==
Frank Vega and Bernie Pope return, this time to Louisiana in an attempt to find a kidnapped friend.

== Cast ==
- Danny Trejo as Frank Vega
- Danny Glover as Bernie Pope
- John Amos as Earl
- Loni Love as Carmen
- Jimmy Bennett as Ronald
- Olga Wilhemine as Violinist
- Jaqueline Fleming as Katie
- Judd Lormand as Detective Williamson
- Sammi Rotibi as Geoffrey
- Rob Mello as Buford
- Al Vicente as Guillermo Gomez
- Deborah Ayorinde as Taryn
- Lucius Baston as H.S. Security Guard
- Miles Doleac as Talk Show Host
- Keith Loneker as Pierre
- Carol Sutton as Lois Morgan

== Release ==
The release date of the film was announced in December 2014. The film was released in theaters on March 6, 2015 and on DVD on April 7, 2015.
